= List of rulers of Bavaria =

Smaller coat of arms of Bavaria

The following is a list of rulers during the history of Bavaria. Bavaria was ruled by several dukes and kings, partitioned and reunited, under several dynasties. Since 1918, Bavaria has been under a republican form of government, and from 1949, Bavaria has been a democratic state in the Federal Republic of Germany.

== Monarchs of Bavaria ==
=== Ducal Bavaria (also known as the "Old Stem duchy") ===
==== Agilolfing dynasty ====
Around 548 the kings of the Franks placed the border region of Bavaria under the administration of a duke—possibly Frankish or possibly chosen from amongst the local leading families—who was supposed to act as a regional governor for the Frankish king. The first duke we know of, and likely the first, was Gariwald, or Garibald I, a member of the powerful Agilolfing family. This was the beginning of a series of Agilolfing dukes that was to last until 788.

Name	Image	Title	Start term	End term	Part	Note
Garibald I		Duke of Bavaria	555 (c.)	591		Some sources call him "King of the Bavarians".
Tassilo I		Duke of Bavaria	591 (c.)	610		Named rex (king) at his ascension.
Garibald II		Duke of Bavaria	610 (c.)	630		
Theodo I		Duke of Bavaria	680 (c.)	716 (?)		By the time of Theodo, who died in 716 or 717, the Bavarian duchy had achieved complete independence from the Frankish kings. Theodo's sons divided the duchy, but by 719 the rule had returned to Grimoald.
Theodbert		Duke	702 (c.)	719	Salzburg	Son of Theodo.
Theobald		Duke	711 (c.)	719	Parts of Bavaria	Son of Theodo.
Tassilo II		Duke	716 (c.)	719	Passau	Son of Theodo.
Grimoald		Duke	716 (c.)	725	Freising	Son of Theodo, later ruling all of Bavaria.
Hugbert		Duke	725	737		Son of Theudbert. In 725(?), Charles Martel, ruler in fact though not in name of the Frankish realm, reasserted royal supremacy over Bavaria, defeating and killing Grimoald and annexing portions of Bavaria during the rule of Hugbert.
Odilo			737	748		Son of Gotfrid.
Grifo			748	748		Carolingian usurper.
Tassilo III		Duke of Bavaria	748	788		In 757 Tassilo III recognized the suzerainty of the Frankish kings Pippin III and did homage to Charlemagne in 781, and again in 787, while pursued an independent policy. In 788, Charlemagne had Tassilo sentenced to death on a charge of treason. Tassilo, granted pardon, entered a monastery and formally renounced his duchy at Frankfurt am Main in 794.
Theodo II		Duke of Bavaria	before 782	787		Son of Tassilo III. Associated with his father. Served as a hostage from 787.

=== Carolingian dynasty and dominion from the Holy Roman Empire ===
The kings (later emperors) of the Franks now assumed complete control, placing Bavaria under the rule of non-hereditary governors and civil servants. They were not dukes but rather kings of Bavaria. Emperor Louis the Pious divided control of the Empire among his sons, and the divisions became permanent in the decades following his death in 840. The Frankish rulers controlled Bavaria as part of their possessions.

Name	Image	Title	Start term	End term	Part	Note
Charlemagne	Charlemagne	Emperor	788	814		Prefects of Bavaria: Gerold (794–799) and Audulf (799–818)
Louis the Pious	Louis the Pious	Emperor	814	826		In 814, Louis appointed his eldest son Lothair I as governor of Bavaria. In 817, Louis bestowed Bavaria upon his other son, Louis the German, who took charge of the province in 826, as King of Bavaria.
Louis the German	Louis the German	King of Bavaria	826	876		In 826, Louis started to rule as King of Bavaria, subordinate to his father, until the latter's death in 840. From 843, Bavaria was merged in Louis the German's Kingdom of East Francia. In 864, Louis the German gave control of Bavaria to his son Carloman, and died in 876. Louis' two younger sons, Louis and Charles—the latter of whom briefly recovered control of all the Frankish possessions—ruled Bavaria in succession after Carloman.
Carloman	Carloman of Bavaria	King of Bavaria	876	880		Eldest son of Louis the German.
Louis the Younger	Louis the Younger	King of Bavaria	880	882		Son of Louis the German.
Charles the Fat	Charles III	King of Bavaria	882	887		Youngest son of Louis the German. Carloman's bastard son, Arnulf of Carinthia, rebelled against Charles and took power in eastern Francia shortly before Charles' death.
Arnulf of Carinthia		King of Bavaria	887	899		Son of Carloman.
Louis the Child		King of Bavaria	899	911		Son of Arnulf of Carinthia.
Engeldeo		Margrave of Bavaria	890	895		Non-dynastic. Deprived of his title marchio Baioariorum and replaced by Luitpold.

=== Ducal Bavaria (also known as the "Younger Stem duchy") ===
Ruled by an array of dukes from an array of rivaling houses, individually appointed to office.

==== Luitpolding dynasty, 911–947 ====
Luitpolding dynasty

Luitpold, founder of the Luitpolding dynasty, was not a duke of Bavaria but a margrave of Carinthia under the rule of Louis the Child. Frankish power had waned in the region due to Hungarian attacks, allowing the local rulers greater independence. Luitpold's son, Arnulf, claimed the title of duke (implying full autonomy) in 911 and was recognized as such by King Henry the Fowler of Germany in 920.

==== German kings, 947–1070 ====
Ottonian dynasty Salian dynasty

From 947 until the 11th century, the kings of Germany repeatedly transferred Bavaria into different hands (including their own), never allowing any one family to establish itself. Bavaria was ruled by a series of short-lasting, mostly unrelated dynasties.

==== Houses of Welf and Babenberg, 1070–1180 ====
Houses of Welf and Babenberg

In 1070, Emperor Henry IV deposed Duke Otto, granting the duchy instead to Welf I, a member of the Italo-Bavarian family of Este. Welf I subsequently quarreled with King Henry and was deprived of his duchy for nineteen years, during which it was directly administered by the German crown. Welf I recovered the duchy in 1096, and was succeeded by his sons Welf II and Henry IX—the latter was succeeded by his son Henry X, who also became Duke of Saxony.

Name	Image	Title	Start term	End term	House	Part	Note
Luitpold		Margrave of Bavaria	895	907	Luitpolding		
Arnulf the Bad		Duke of Bavaria	907	920	Luitpolding		Son of Luitpold. Arnulf the Bad claimed the title of duke—implying full autonomy—in 911, and was recognized as such by King Henry the Fowler in 920.
Eberhard		Duke of Bavaria	937	938	Luitpolding		
Berthold		Duke of Bavaria	938	947	Luitpolding		Younger son of Luitpold. The German King Otto I reasserted central authority, banishing Arnulf's son Eberhard and re-granting the title to Berthold, a younger son of Luitpold.
Henry I	Henry II	Duke of Bavaria	947	955	Ottonian		Son of Henry the Fowler. On Berthold's death, Otto I, Holy Roman Emperor, gave the duchy to his own brother Henry (I), who was also Arnulf the Bad's son-in-law.
Henry II the Quarrelsome	Henry II	Duke of Bavaria	955	976	Ottonian		Henry II made war upon his cousin, Emperor Otto II, and was deprived of his duchy in 976 in favor of his cousin Otto, Duke of Swabia (who now acquired two dukedoms).
Otto I	Otto I	Duke of Bavaria	976	982	Ottonian		
Henry III the Younger		Duke of Bavaria	983	985	Luitpolding		Bavaria was given to Berthold's son Henry III, briefly restoring the Luitpolding dynasty. Henry III exchanged Bavaria for Carinthia, and Henry II received Bavaria again.
Henry II the Quarrelsome	Henry II	Duke of Bavaria	985	995	Ottonian		Restored
Henry IV	Henry IV	Duke of Bavaria	995	1004	Ottonian		Son of Henry II the Quarrelsome. Henry IV was elected as Holy Roman Emperor Henry II, and gave Bavaria to his brother-in-law Henry V, Count of Luxemburg in 1004.
Henry V		Duke of Bavaria	1004	1009	Luxemburg		Son of Siegfried of Luxembourg.
Henry IV		Duke of Bavaria	1009	1017	Ottonian		Henry IV reasserted direct control.
Henry V		Duke of Bavaria	1017	1026	Luxemburg		Son of Siegfried of Luxembourg. Conrad II, Holy Roman Emperor, King of Germany, gave Bavaria to his son Henry VI after the death of Henry V in 1026.
Henry VI	Henry	Duke of Bavaria	1026	1042	Salian		Son of Conrad II, Holy Roman Emperor. Later Henry was elected as Holy Roman Emperor Henry III, and became King of Germany in 1039.
Henry VII	Henry VII	Duke of Bavaria	1042	1047	Luxemburg		Son of Frederick of Luxembourg. In 1042, Henry III, Holy Roman Emperor, granted the duchy to Henry VII, Count of Luxemburg, nephew of Henry V.
Conrad I (Kuno)		Duke of Bavaria	1049	1053	Ezzonen		Son of Liudolf of Lotharingia. After Henry VII's death, the dukedom was vacant for a couple of years. Henry III, Holy Roman Emperor, then gave the duchy to Kuno, Count of Zütphen, in 1049. Kuno was deposed in 1053.
Henry VIII	Henry IV	Duke of Bavaria	1053	1054	Salian		Son of Henry III, Holy Roman Emperor. During his reign in Bavaria Henry VIII was a minor (born 1050). In 1056 he became King of Germany and Holy Roman Emperor as Henry IV in 1084.
Conrad II		Duke of Bavaria	1054	1055	Salian		(minor, born 1052, died 1055) Son of Henry III, Holy Roman Emperor
Henry VIII	Henry IV	Duke of Bavaria	1055	1061	Salian		(minor: born 1050) Son of Henry III, Holy Roman Emperor. Henry VIII became King of Germany (1056) and Henry IV, Holy Roman Emperor in 1084.
Otto II		Duke of Bavaria	1061	1070	Nordheim		In 1061 Empress Agnes—the 11-year-old King Henry IV's mother and regent—entrusted the duchy to Otto of Nordheim.
Welf I	Welf I	Duke of Bavaria	1070	1077	Welf		Welf I subsequently quarreled with Henry IV, Holy Roman Emperor and was deprived of his duchy for nineteen years, during which it was directly administered by the German crown.
Henry VIII	Henry IV	Duke of Bavaria	1077	1096	Salian		(minor: born 1050) Son of Henry III, Holy Roman Emperor. Henry VIII became King of Germany (1056) and Henry IV, Holy Roman Emperor in 1084.
Welf I		Duke of Bavaria	1096	1101	Welf		Welf I recovered the duchy in 1096.
Welf II		Duke of Bavaria	1101	1120	Welf		Son of Welf I
Henry IX the Black	Henry IX	Duke of Bavaria	1120	1126	Welf		Son of Welf I. Abdicated.
Henry X the Proud		Duke of Bavaria	1126	1138	Welf		Son of Henry IX the Black. In a power struggle with King Conrad III of Germany, Henry X lost his duchy to the King, who granted it to his follower Leopold Margrave of Austria.
Leopold I	Leopold IV	Duke of Bavaria	1139	1141	Babenberg		When Leopold died, Conrad III of Germany resumed the duchy and granted it to Leopold's brother Henry XI.
Henry XI Jasomirgott	Henry XI	Duke of Bavaria	1143	1156	Babenberg		Brother of Leopold.
Henry XII the Lion	Henry XII	Duke of Bavaria	1156	1180	Welf		When Frederick I, Holy Roman Emperor, became king of Germany, he restored Bavaria to the Welf line in the person of Henry X's son, Henry XII the Lion, Duke of Saxony.

=== Ducal and Electoral Bavaria (Hereditary dukes) ===
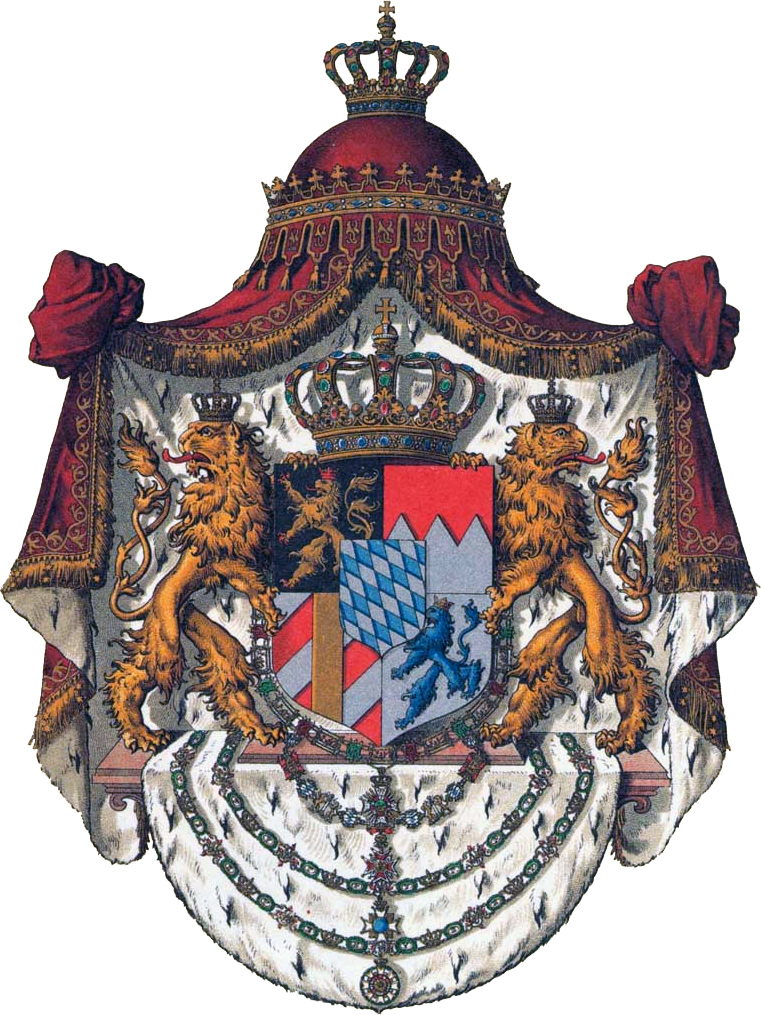
Coat of arms of the Kingdom of Bavaria

In 1180, Henry XII the Lion and Frederick I, Holy Roman Emperor, fell out. The emperor consequently dispossessed the duke and gave his territory to Otto I, Duke of Bavaria of the House of Wittelsbach. From then on, Bavaria remained in the possession of various branches of the family for 738 years until the end of World War I.

==== First partition, 1253–1340 ====
In 1253, on Otto II's death, Bavaria was divided between his sons. Henry became Duke of Lower Bavaria and Louis of Upper Bavaria. From this point until the beginning of the 16th century, the territories were frequently divided between brothers, making the dukes difficult to list.

In Lower Bavaria, Henry XIII was succeeded by his three sons, Otto III, Louis III, and Stephen I ruling jointly. Otto III's successor in the joint dukedom was his son Henry XV. Stephen's successors were his sons Otto IV and Henry XIV. Henry XIV's son was John I.

In Upper Bavaria, Louis II was succeeded by his sons Rudolf I and Louis IV. The latter was elected King of Germany in 1314. After John I's death in 1340, Louis IV unified the Bavarian duchy.

The dukes of Upper Bavaria served also as Counts Palatinate of the Rhine. In 1329 Louis IV released the Palatinate of the Rhine including the Bavarian Upper Palatinate to the sons of Rudolf I. The Upper Palatinate would be reunited with Bavaria in 1623, the Lower Palatinate in 1777.

==== Second partition 1349–1503 ====
From 1349 until 1503 the second partition of Bavaria took place. In 1349, the six sons of Louis IV partitioned Bavaria into Upper and Lower Bavaria again. In 1353, Lower Bavaria was partitioned into Bavaria-Landshut and Bavaria-Straubing. Upper Bavaria was partitioned between Bavaria-Straubing and Bavaria-Landshut in 1363. After the death of Stephan II in 1392, Bavaria-Landshut was broken into three duchies, John II gained Bavaria-Munich, Frederick, Duke of Bavaria-Landshut received a smaller Bavaria-Landshut, and in Bavaria-Ingolstadt ruled Stephen III, Duke of Bavaria.

Following the Landshut War (1503–1505), the Duke of Bavaria-Munich Albert IV the Wise became ruler of Bavaria. In 1506 Albert decreed that the duchy should pass according to the rules of primogeniture.

In 1623 Maximilian I was granted the title Prince-elector (German: Kurfürst) of the Rhenish Palatinate.

=== House of Wittelsbach ===
==== Partitions of Bavaria under Wittelsbach rule ====
Duchy of Bavaria (1180–1253)
Lower Bavaria (1st creation) (1253–1340)	Upper Bavaria (1st creation) (1253–1340)
Duchy of Bavaria (Upper line) (1340–1349)
Lower Bavaria (2nd creation) (1349–1353)	Upper Bavaria (2nd creation) (1349–1363) (divided among the other duchies)
Landshut (1353–1503)
Straubing (1353–1432) (divided among the other duchies)
Munich (1392–1503)	Ingolstadt (1392–1445)
Dachau (1467–1501)
Leuchtenberg (1646-1705)	Duchy of Bavaria (Munich line) (1503–1623); Raised to: Electorate of Bavaria (1623–1806)

==== Table of rulers ====
(Note: Here the numbering of the dukes is the same for all duchies, as all were titled Dukes of Bavaria, despite the different parts of land and its particular numbering of the rulers. The dukes are numbered by the year of their succession.)

Ruler		Born	Reign	Death	Ruling part	Consort	Notes
Otto III the Redhead		1117	1180–1183	11 July 1183	Bavaria	Agnes of Loon; 1169 eleven children	In 1180 Frederick I, Holy Roman Emperor gave Bavaria to Otto I Wittelsbach, Duke of Bavaria of the House of Wittelsbach.
Regency of Agnes of Loon (1183-1189)							Son of Otto III. Louis obtained the Palatinate of the Rhine in 1214. So Louis I served also as Count Palatine of the Rhine. He was assassinated 1231.
Louis I the Kelheimer		23 December 1173	1183–1231	15 September 1231	Bavaria	Ludmilla of Bohemia; 1204 one child	Son of Otto III. Louis obtained the Palatinate of the Rhine in 1214. So Louis I served also as Count Palatine of the Rhine. He was assassinated 1231.
Otto IV the Illustrious		7 April 1206	1231–1253	29 November 1253	Bavaria	Agnes of the Palatinate; 1222; Worms eleven children	Otto IV served also as Count Palatine of the Rhine. On Otto IV's death, Bavaria was divided between his sons. Henry became duke of Lower Bavaria, and Louis of Upper Bavaria. From this point until the beginning of the 16th century, the territories were frequently divided between brothers.
Henry XIII		19 November 1235	1253–1290	3 February 1290	Lower Bavaria	Elizabeth of Hungary; 1250 ten children	Son of Otto IV. After the partition of 1253, received Lower Bavaria.
Louis II the Strict		13 April 1229	1253–1294	2 February 1294	Upper Bavaria	Maria of Brabant; 2 August 1254 (executed) no children Anna of Głogów; 1260 two children Matilda of Austria; 24 October 1273 four children	Son of Otto IV. After the partition of 1253, received Upper Bavaria.
Otto V		11 February 1261	1290–1312	9 November 1312	Lower Bavaria	Catherine of Austria; January 1279 two children Anna of Głogów; 18 May 1309 two children	Sons of Henry XIII, ruled jointly. In 1305 Otto became also King of Hungary and Croatia, as grandson of Béla IV of Hungary.
Louis III		9 October 1269	1290–1296	9 October 1296	Lower Bavaria	Isabella of Lorraine; 1287 no children	Sons of Henry XIII, ruled jointly. In 1305 Otto became also King of Hungary and Croatia, as grandson of Béla IV of Hungary.
Stephen I		14 March 1271	1290–1310	10 December 1310	Lower Bavaria	Judith of Świdnica-Jawor; 1299 eight children	Sons of Henry XIII, ruled jointly. In 1305 Otto became also King of Hungary and Croatia, as grandson of Béla IV of Hungary.
Regency of Matilda of Austria (1294-1296)							Sons of Louis II, ruled jointly. In 1317 Rudolph abdicated of his rights to his brother, who in 1328 was elected Holy Roman Emperor. Louis had already been elected King of Germany in 1314. In the Treaty of Pavia (1329) Louis IV released the Palatinate of the Rhine passing the Bavarian Upper Palatinate to the sons of Rudolf I. After John I the Child's death in 1340, Louis IV unified the Bavarian duchy.
Rudolph I the Stammerer		4 October 1274	1294–1317	12 August 1319	Upper Bavaria	Matilda of Nassau; 1 September 1294; Nuremberg six children	Sons of Louis II, ruled jointly. In 1317 Rudolph abdicated of his rights to his brother, who in 1328 was elected Holy Roman Emperor. Louis had already been elected King of Germany in 1314. In the Treaty of Pavia (1329) Louis IV released the Palatinate of the Rhine passing the Bavarian Upper Palatinate to the sons of Rudolf I. After John I the Child's death in 1340, Louis IV unified the Bavarian duchy.
Louis IV the Bavarian		5 April 1282	1294–1340	11 October 1347	Upper Bavaria	Beatrice of Świdnica-Jawor; 14 October 1308 six children Margaret II, Countess of Holland-Hainaut; 26 February 1324; Cologne ten children	Sons of Louis II, ruled jointly. In 1317 Rudolph abdicated of his rights to his brother, who in 1328 was elected Holy Roman Emperor. Louis had already been elected King of Germany in 1314. In the Treaty of Pavia (1329) Louis IV released the Palatinate of the Rhine passing the Bavarian Upper Palatinate to the sons of Rudolf I. After John I the Child's death in 1340, Louis IV unified the Bavarian duchy.
Louis IV the Bavarian		5 April 1282	1340–1347	11 October 1347	Bavaria	Beatrice of Świdnica-Jawor; 14 October 1308 six children Margaret II, Countess of Holland-Hainaut; 26 February 1324; Cologne ten children	Sons of Louis II, ruled jointly. In 1317 Rudolph abdicated of his rights to his brother, who in 1328 was elected Holy Roman Emperor. Louis had already been elected King of Germany in 1314. In the Treaty of Pavia (1329) Louis IV released the Palatinate of the Rhine passing the Bavarian Upper Palatinate to the sons of Rudolf I. After John I the Child's death in 1340, Louis IV unified the Bavarian duchy.
Regency of Louis IV, Duke of Bavaria (1312-19)							Sons of Stephen I (Henry XIV and Otto VI) and Otto V (Henry XV), ruled jointly.
Henry XIV the Elder		29 September 1305	1312–1339	1 September 1339	Lower Bavaria	Margaret of Bohemia; 12 August 1328 two children	Sons of Stephen I (Henry XIV and Otto VI) and Otto V (Henry XV), ruled jointly.
Otto VI		3 January 1307	1312–1334	14 December 1334	Lower Bavaria	Richardis of Jülich; 1330 one child	Sons of Stephen I (Henry XIV and Otto VI) and Otto V (Henry XV), ruled jointly.
Henry XV the Natternberger		28 August 1312	1312–1333	18 June 1333	Lower Bavaria	Anna of Austria between 1326 and 1328 no children	Sons of Stephen I (Henry XIV and Otto VI) and Otto V (Henry XV), ruled jointly.
Regency of Louis IV, Duke of Bavaria (1339-40)							Left no male heirs, which allowed his cousin (and brother-in-law) Louis to reunite the Bavarian lands.
John I the Child		29 November 1329	1339–1340	20 December 1340	Lower Bavaria	Anna of Upper Bavaria; 18 April 1339; Munich no children	Left no male heirs, which allowed his cousin (and brother-in-law) Louis to reunite the Bavarian lands.
Louis V the Brandenburger		May 1315	1347–1349	18 September 1361	Bavaria	Margaret of Denmark; 1324 no children Margaret, Countess of Tyrol; 10 February 1342; Meran four children	The six sons of Louis IV, ruled jointly until 1349, when they divided the land: Louis V, Louis VI and Otto VII kept Upper Bavaria; William, Albert and Stephen Lower Bavaria. In 1351 Louis VI and Otto gave up their inheritance in Bavaria, in exchange of the Electoral dignity in Brandenburg. Having lost the Electorate of Brandenburg in 1373, Otto returned to Bavaria to claim new inheritance, and shared the part of Stephen II's sons (his nephews) in Landshut. In Lower Bavaria, the three brothers divided the land again in 1353: Stephen kept Landshut, William and Albert shared Straubing, and from 1389 the two shared Straubing also with Albert I's son, Albert II.
Louis V the Brandenburger		May 1315	1349–1361	18 September 1361	Upper Bavaria	Margaret of Denmark; 1324 no children Margaret, Countess of Tyrol; 10 February 1342; Meran four children	
Louis VI the Roman		7 May 1328	1347–1349	17 May 1365	Bavaria	Cunigunde of Poland before 1349 no children Ingeborg of Mecklenburg-Schwerin; 1360 no children	
Louis VI the Roman		7 May 1328	1349–1351	17 May 1365	Upper Bavaria	Cunigunde of Poland before 1349 no children Ingeborg of Mecklenburg-Schwerin; 1360 no children	
Otto VII the Lazy		1340/42	1347–1349	15 November 1379	Bavaria	Catherine of Bohemia; 19 March 1366 no children	
Otto VII the Lazy		1340/42	1349–1351	15 November 1379	Upper Bavaria	Catherine of Bohemia; 19 March 1366 no children	
Otto VII the Lazy		1340/42	1375–1379	15 November 1379	Bavaria-Landshut	Catherine of Bohemia; 19 March 1366 no children	
Stephen II the Representative		1319	1347–1349	13 May 1375	Bavaria	Elisabeth of Sicily; 27 June 1328 four children Margaret of Nuremberg; 14 February 1359 three children	
Stephen II the Representative		1319	1349–1353	13 May 1375	Lower Bavaria	Elisabeth of Sicily; 27 June 1328 four children Margaret of Nuremberg; 14 February 1359 three children	
Stephen II the Representative		1319	1353–1375	13 May 1375	Bavaria-Landshut	Elisabeth of Sicily; 27 June 1328 four children Margaret of Nuremberg; 14 February 1359 three children	
William I the Mad		12 May 1330	1347–1349	15 April 1389	Bavaria	Matilda of England; 1352; London no children	
William I the Mad		12 May 1330	1349–1353	15 April 1389	Lower Bavaria	Matilda of England; 1352; London no children	
William I the Mad		12 May 1330	1353–1389	15 April 1389	Bavaria-Straubing	Matilda of England; 1352; London no children	
Albert I		25 July 1336	1347–1349	13 December 1404	Bavaria	Margaret of Brzeg after 19 July 1353; Passau seven children Margaret of Clèves; 1394; Heusden no children	
Albert I		25 July 1336	1349–1353	13 December 1404	Lower Bavaria	Margaret of Brzeg after 19 July 1353; Passau seven children Margaret of Clèves; 1394; Heusden no children	
Albert I		25 July 1336	1353–1404	13 December 1404	Bavaria-Straubing	Margaret of Brzeg after 19 July 1353; Passau seven children Margaret of Clèves; 1394; Heusden no children	
Albert II		1368	1389–1397	21 January 1397	Bavaria-Straubing	Unmarried	
Meinhard I		9 February 1344	1361–1363	13 January 1363	Upper Bavaria	Margaret of Austria; 4 September 1359; Passau no children	Left no male descendants. After his death Upper Bavaria was divided between Bavaria-Landshut and Bavaria-Straubing.
Definitively annexed by Bavaria-Landshut (1/2) and Bavaria-Straubing (1/2)
Frederick I the Wise		1339	1375–1393	4 December 1393	Bavaria-Landshut	Anna of Neuffen; 1360 one child Maddalena Visconti; 2 September 1381 five children	Ruled jointly. Shared rule, until 1379, with their uncle Otto VII. In 1392 the brothers divided the land once more. Frederick retained Landshut, Stephen kept Ingolstadt and John received Munich.
Stephen III the Magnificent		1337	1375–1392	26 September 1413	Bavaria-Landshut	Taddea Visconti; 13 October 1364 two children Anna of Neuffen; 16 January 1401; Cologne no children	Ruled jointly. Shared rule, until 1379, with their uncle Otto VII. In 1392 the brothers divided the land once more. Frederick retained Landshut, Stephen kept Ingolstadt and John received Munich.
Stephen III the Magnificent		1337	1392–1413	26 September 1413	Bavaria-Ingolstadt	Taddea Visconti; 13 October 1364 two children Anna of Neuffen; 16 January 1401; Cologne no children	Ruled jointly. Shared rule, until 1379, with their uncle Otto VII. In 1392 the brothers divided the land once more. Frederick retained Landshut, Stephen kept Ingolstadt and John received Munich.
John II		1341	1375–1392	14 June/1 July 1397	Bavaria-Landshut	Catherine of Gorizia; 1372 three children	Ruled jointly. Shared rule, until 1379, with their uncle Otto VII. In 1392 the brothers divided the land once more. Frederick retained Landshut, Stephen kept Ingolstadt and John received Munich.
John II		1341	1392–1397	14 June/1 July 1397	Bavaria-Munich	Catherine of Gorizia; 1372 three children	Ruled jointly. Shared rule, until 1379, with their uncle Otto VII. In 1392 the brothers divided the land once more. Frederick retained Landshut, Stephen kept Ingolstadt and John received Munich.
Regencies of Maddalena Visconti and Stephen III, Duke of Bavaria (1393-1401), John II, Duke of Bavaria (1393-97), Ernest, Duke of Bavaria and William III, Duke of Bavaria (1397-1401)							Annexed Ingolstadt in 1445.
Henry XVI the Rich		1386	1393–1450	30 July 1450	Bavaria-Landshut	Margaret of Austria; 25 November 1412; Landshut six children	Annexed Ingolstadt in 1445.
Ernest		1373	1397–1438	14 June/1 July 1397	Bavaria-Munich	Elisabetta Visconti; 26 January 1395; Pfaffenhofen an der Ilm four children	Ruled jointly.
William III		1375	1397–1435	12 September 1435	Bavaria-Munich	Margaret of Cleves; 1433 two children	Ruled jointly.
William II		5 April 1365	1404–1417	31 May 1417	Bavaria-Straubing	Margaret of Burgundy; 12 April 1385; Cambrai one child	Eldest son of Albert I.
Louis VII the Bearded		1368	1413–1443	1 May 1447	Bavaria-Ingolstadt	Anne de Bourbon-La Marche; 1 October 1402 two children Catherine of Alençon; 1413 two children	Imprisoned by his son, who was allied with Henry XVI. Died in prison.
John III the Pitiless		1374	1417–1425	6 January 1425	Bavaria-Straubing	Elizabeth I, Duchess of Luxembourg; 11418 no children	Son of Albert I. Contested Jacqueline, the heiress of the Wittelsbach possessions in the Low Countries, until his death.
Definitively annexed by the remaining Bavarian duchies
Albert III		27 March 1401	1438–1460	29 February 1460	Bavaria-Munich	Agnes Bernauer c. 1432? (morganatic) no children Anna of Brunswick-Grubenhagen; 22 January 1437; Munich ten children	Son of Ernest.
Louis VIII the Hunchback		1 September 1403	1443–1445	7 April 1445	Bavaria-Ingolstadt	Unmarried	After his death Ingolstadt was annexed by Landshut.
Definitively annexed by Bavaria-Landshut
Louis IX the Rich		23 February 1417	1450–1479	18 January 1479	Bavaria-Landshut	Amalia of Saxony; 21 March 1452; Landshut four children	
John IV		4 October 1437	1460–1463	18 November 1463	Bavaria-Munich	Unmarried	Son of Albert III, ruled jointly with his brothers Sigismund and Albert IV.
Sigismund		26 July 1439	1460–1467	1 February 1501	Bavaria-Munich	Unmarried	In 1467, Sigismund created a smaller duchy with its center in Dachau, but left no descendants, and this duchy was merged again in Bavaria-Munich after his death.
Sigismund		26 July 1439	1467–1501	1 February 1501	Bavaria-Dachau	Unmarried	In 1467, Sigismund created a smaller duchy with its center in Dachau, but left no descendants, and this duchy was merged again in Bavaria-Munich after his death.
Definitively annexed by Bavaria-Munich
George I the Rich		15 August 1455	1479–1503	1 December 1503	Bavaria-Landshut	Hedwig of Poland; 14 November 1475; Landshut five children	Left no male descendants at his death. His duchy was annexed to Bavaria-Munich, which reunited the Bavarian duchy.
Albert IV the Wise		15 December 1447	1460–1503	18 March 1508	Bavaria-Munich	Kunigunde of Austria; 3 January 1487; Munich seven children	Co-ruled with his brothers John IV and Sigismund. Reunited the duchy in 1503. In 1506 Albert decreed that the duchy should pass according to the rules of primogeniture.
Albert IV the Wise		15 December 1447	1503–1508	18 March 1508	Duchy of Bavaria	Kunigunde of Austria; 3 January 1487; Munich seven children	Co-ruled with his brothers John IV and Sigismund. Reunited the duchy in 1503. In 1506 Albert decreed that the duchy should pass according to the rules of primogeniture.
William IV the Steadfast		13 November 1493	1508–1550	7 March 1550	Duchy of Bavaria	Jakobaea of Baden; 5 October 1522; Munich four children	Sons of Albert IV, the last Bavarian pair of brothers ruling together.
Louis X		18 September 1495	1516–1545	22 April 1545	Duchy of Bavaria	Unmarried	Sons of Albert IV, the last Bavarian pair of brothers ruling together.
Albert V the Magnanimous	Albert V	29 February 1528	1550–1579	24 October 1579	Duchy of Bavaria	Anna of Austria; 4 July 1546; Regensburg seven children	
William V the Pious	William V	29 September 1548	1579–1597	7 February 1626	Duchy of Bavaria	Renata of Lorraine; 22 February 1568; Munich ten children	
Maximilian I the Great	Maximilian I	17 April 1573	1597–1651	27 September 1651	Duchy of Bavaria (until 1623) Electorate of Bavaria (from 1623)	Elisabeth of Lorraine; 9 February 1595; Nancy no children Maria Anna of Austria; 15 July 1635; Vienna two children	Children of William V. Maximilian I, was an ally of Emperor Ferdinand II in the Thirty Years' War. When the Elector of the Palatinate, Frederick V, head of a senior branch of the Wittelsbachs, became involved in the war against the Emperor, he was stripped of his Imperial offices and the Prince-elector title. Maximilian I was granted the Electorate of the Palatinate in 1623. Albert VI inherited from his wife the lands of Leuchtenberg, and from 1646 reorganizes them as a new Bavarian duchy, the short-lived Duchy of Bavaria-Leuchtenberg.
Albert VI	Albert VI	26 February 1584	1646-1666	5 July 1666	Duchy of Bavaria-Leuchtenberg	Mechtild of Leuchtenberg (24 October 1588 – 1 June 1634); 8 December 1650 five children	
Regency of Albert VI, Duke of Bavaria (1651-1654)							Son of Maximilian I.
Ferdinand Maria	Ferdinand Maria	31 October 1636	1651-1679	26 May 1679	Electorate of Bavaria	Henriette Adelaide of Savoy; 8 December 1650 eight children	Son of Maximilian I.
Maximilian Philip Hieronymus	Maximilian Philip	30 September 1638	1666-1705	20 March 1705	Duchy of Bavaria-Leuchtenberg	Mauricienne Fébronie de La Tour d'Auvergne (1652-1706); 1668; Château-Thierry no children	Son of Maximilian I, inherited his uncle Albert VI's possessions. His childless death led to the union of the Bavarian Leuchtenberg lands and the Electorate.
Annexed to the Electorate of Bavaria
Regency of Maximilian Philipp Hieronymus, Duke of Bavaria-Leuchtenberg (1679-1680)							Took part in the War of the Spanish Succession on the side of France, against Leopold I, Holy Roman Emperor. He was accordingly forced to flee Bavaria following the Battle of Blenheim and deprived of his Electorate on 29 April 1706. He regained his Electorate in 1714 by the Peace of Baden and ruled until 1726.
Maximilian II Emanuel	Maximilian II Emanuel	11 July 1662	1679-1726	26 February 1726	Electorate of Bavaria	Maria Antonia of Austria; 15 July 1685; Vienna three children Theresa Kunegunda Sobieska; 15 August 1694; Warsaw (by proxy) ten children	Took part in the War of the Spanish Succession on the side of France, against Leopold I, Holy Roman Emperor. He was accordingly forced to flee Bavaria following the Battle of Blenheim and deprived of his Electorate on 29 April 1706. He regained his Electorate in 1714 by the Peace of Baden and ruled until 1726.
Charles Albert	Charles Albert	6 August 1697	1726-1745	20 January 1745	Electorate of Bavaria	Maria Amalia of Austria; 5 October 1722; Vienna seven children	Took on the House of Habsburg in the War of the Austrian Succession, again in combination with France, succeeding so far as to be elected Holy Roman Emperor in 1742 (as Charles VII). However, the Austrians occupied Bavaria (1742–1744), and the Emperor died shortly after returning to Munich.
Maximilian III Joseph the Beloved	Maximillian III	28 March 1727	1745-1777	30 December 1777	Electorate of Bavaria	Maria Anna Sophia of Saxony; 9 July 1747 no children	As he had no children, was the last of the direct Bavarian Wittelsbach line descended from Louis IV. He was succeeded by the Elector of the Palatinate, Charles Theodore, who thereby regained their old titles for the senior Wittelsbach line—descended from Louis IV's older brother Rudolf I.
Charles Theodore		11 December 1724	1777-1799	16 February 1799	Electorate of Bavaria (merged with Electoral Palatinate)	Elisabeth Augusta of Palatinate-Sulzbach; 17 January 1742; Mannheim one child Maria Leopoldine of Austria-Este; 15 February 1795; Hofburg, Innsbruck no children	Son of John Christian, Count Palatine of Sulzbach and Marie Anne Henriëtte Leopoldine de La Tour d'Auvergne. Distant cousin of Maximilian III; Elector Palatine from 1743. Charles Theodore was also childless, and was succeeded by a distant cousin, the Count Palatine of Zweibrücken, Maximilian IV Joseph—later King Maximilian I.
Maximilian IV Joseph	Maximillian I	27 May 1756	1799–1806	6 August 1806	Electorate of Bavaria (merged with Electoral Palatinate)	Augusta Wilhelmine of Hesse-Darmstadt; 30 September 1785; Darmstadt five children Caroline of Baden; 9 March 1797; Karlsruhe eight children	Son of Count Palatine Frederick Michael of Zweibrücken. Distant cousin of Charles Theodore; Count Palatine of Zweibrücken from 1795. In the chaos of the wars of the French Revolution, the old order of the Holy Roman Empire collapsed. In the course of these events, Bavaria became once again the ally of France, and Maximilian IV Joseph became King Maximilian I of Bavaria—whilst remaining Prince-Elector and Arch-steward of the Holy Roman Empire until 6 August 1806, when the Holy Roman Empire was abolished.

=== Kingdom of Bavaria ===
In 1805 under the Peace of Pressburg between Napoleonic France and the Holy Roman Empire several duchies were elevated to kingdoms. The Wittelsbach rulers of Bavaria held the title King of Bavaria from 1806 until 1918. The prince-elector of Bavaria, Maximilian IV Joseph formally assumed the title King Maximilian I of Bavaria on 1 January 1806. The well-known so called Märchenkönig (Fairy tale king) Ludwig II constructed Neuschwanstein Castle, Herrenchiemsee, and Linderhof Palace during his reign (1864–1886), threatening not only to go bankrupt in person, but also to bankrupt the country in the process. In 1918 Ludwig III lost his throne in the German Revolution of 1918–1919.

Name	Image	Title	Start term	End term	House	Note
Maximilian I	Maximillian I	King of Bavaria	1 January 1806	13 October 1825	Wittelsbach	See above.
Ludwig I	Ludwig I	King of Bavaria	13 October 1825	20 March 1848	Wittelsbach	Son of Maximilian I Joseph. Abdicated in the Revolutions of 1848.
Maximilian II	Maximillian II	King of Bavaria	20 March 1848	10 March 1864	Wittelsbach	Son of Ludwig I.
Ludwig II	Ludwig II	King of Bavaria	10 March 1864	13 June 1886	Wittelsbach	Son of Maximilian II Ludwig II was called the Märchenkönig (Fairy tale king). He grudgingly acceded to Bavaria becoming a component of the German Empire in 1871, was declared insane in 1886.
Otto	Otto	King of Bavaria	13 June 1886	5 November 1913	Wittelsbach	Brother of Ludwig II and son of Maximilian II. From a mathematical, calendrical point of view, his marked the longest "reign" amongst the Kings of Bavaria. However, Otto was mentally ill since teenhood and throughout all of his later life, hence the royal functions had to be carried out by the following prince regents: Prince Luitpold of Bavaria 10 June 1886 – 12 December 1912; Prince Ludwig of Bavaria 12 December 1912 – 5 November 1913
Ludwig III	Ludwig III	King of Bavaria	5 November 1913	13 November 1918	Wittelsbach	Cousin of Otto, son of Prince Luitpold and grandson of Ludwig I. Prince regent from 1912 until 1913. Declared King of Bavaria following a controversial change of the constitution, discharging his cousin Otto from "office". Lost the throne in the German Revolution of 1918–1919 at the end of World War I. Marks the end of 738 years of uninterrupted Wittelsbach rule over Bavaria.

== Post-monarchy ==
In 1918, at the end of the First World War in the German Revolution of 1918–1919, Bavaria became a democratic republic within the Weimar Republic; the name for the period of Germany from 1919 to 1933. Since then, the heads of government of Bavaria have been minister-presidents.

== Family tree ==
Dukes called Louis are usually numbered from Louis the Kelheimer (r. 1189–1231), although four Dukes of Bavaria had been called Louis before that. The same applies to Dukes called Otto, who are sometimes renumbered starting with Otto III, the first Wittelsbach Duke of Bavaria. The highest number has been used in this chart to minimise confusion, with one exception: Ludwig is the German for Louis, but Kings Ludwig I, II and III are not numbered XV, XVI and XVII.

The colours denote the Dukes, Electors and Kings over the following regions of Bavaria and under the following circumstances:

Dukes of Bavaria
Regents and pretenders to the Bavarian throne
Dukes of Lower Bavaria
Dukes of Upper Bavaria
Dukes of Bavaria-Lanshut
Dukes of Bavaria-Ingolstadt
Dukes of Bavaria-Munich
Dukes of Bavaria-Munich-Dachau
Dukes of Bavaria-Straubing
Dukes of Bavaria-Straubing, disputed

AGILOLFING
Garibald I 540–555–591	Waldrada of Neustria; 531–572
Tassilo I 560–591–610	Romilda of Friuli died 611	Gisulf II of Friuli; 545–611
Garibald II; 565–610–625	Geila of Friuli	Irmina of Ören died c. 707	Pfalzgraf; Hugobert died 697
CAROLINGIAN
Bertrada of Prüm; 670–721	Theodo I uncertain	Alpaida c. 654 – 714	Pepin of Herstal; 635–714	Plectrude died 718
Caribert of Laon died c. 762	Theodo II; 625–680–716
AHALOLFING
unknown daughter	Godfrey of Alemannia c. 650 – 709	Grimoald ?–716–725	Biltrude fl. 725	Theobald ?–711–717	Tassilo II ?–716–719	Theodebert; 685–702–719	Regintrud c. 663 – 735
Huoching of Alemannia c. 675 – 744	Desiderius of the Lombards died 786	Rotrude of Hesbaye died 724	Charles; Martel; 688–741	Swanachild fl. 726	Hugbert r. 725–736
Hnabi of Alemannia; 710–789	Odilo ?–736–748	Hiltrude of the Franks; 716–754	Bertrada of Laon c. 718 – 783	Pepin the Short; 714–768	Grifo; 726–748–748–753
UDALRICHING
Emma of Alemannia died c. 789	Gerold; 725–794–799	Tassilo III; 741–748– 788–796	Liutberga of the Lombards fl. 763
Hildegard of Vinzgau; 754–783	Charles I the Great; 748–788– 794–799–814	Desiderata of the Lombards fl. 770	Welf the Elder died c. 825
Ermengarde of Hesbaye; 778–818	Louis I the Pious; 778–817– 829–840	Judith of Bavaria; 797–843	Eticho of Ammergau (great-grandson of Welf the Elder)
Counrad I of Auxerre died 864	Lothair; 795–814– 817–855	Louis II the German; 810–817– 865–876	Emma of Altdorf; 803–876	Gisela of the Franks c. 821 – 870	Eberhard of Friuli; 815–867	Charles the Bald; 823–877	Ermentrude of Orléans; 823–869	Engeldeo r. 890–895	Henry of the Golden Wagon
Conrad II of Transjurane; Burgundy died 876	Louis III the Younger; 835–880–882	Charles II the Fat; 839–882– 887–888	Carloman; 828–864–880	Liutswind	Ernest of the Nordgau	Gisela of Swabia	Uruoch III of Friuli; 840–874	Ansgarde of Burgundy died c. 881	Louis II of France; 836–879	Adelaide of Paris; 853–901	Berengar I of Italy; 845–924	Rudolf I of Altdorf
LUITPOLDING
Rudolf I of Burgundy; 859–912	Guilla of Provence died c. 924	Ota of the Hessengau c. 874 – 901	Arnulf I 850–887–899	Leopold I r. 899–907	Cunigunde of Swabia; 878–918	Eberhard of the Sülichgau died c. 889	Ermentrude of France born c. 875	Charles the Simple; 879–929	Matilda of Ringelheim; 892–988	Gisela of Friuli; 876–913	Albert I of Ivrea died c. 829	Rudolf II of Altdorf died c. 990
OTTONIAN	ARDENNE
Rudolf II of Burgundy; 880–937	Bertha of Swabia; 907–966	Henry the Fowler; 876–936	Louis IV the Child; 893–899–911	Judith of Friuli born c. 888	Arnulf II the Bad r. 907–937	Berthold; 900–938–947	Wiltrude of Bergen	Cunigunde of France c. 893 – 923	Wigeric of Lotharingia died c. 923	Berengar II of Italy died 966	Louis IV of France; 921–954	Gerberga of Saxony; 913–968	Welf II of Altdorf died 1030
Adelaide of Italy; 931–999	Otto I, Holy Roman; Emperor; 912–973	Edith of England; 910–946	Henry I 919–948–955	Judith of Bavaria; 925–985	Eberhard r. 937–938	Henry III the Younger; 940–983–985–989	Hedwig of the Nordgau; 922–993	Sigfried of the Ardennes; 922–998	Adelaide of Bellay	Conrad I of Burgundy; 925–993	Matilda of France; 943–982
SALIAN	ESTE
Liudolf of Swabia; 930–957	Liutgarde of Saxony; 932–953	Conrad of Lorraine; 922–955	Henry II the Quarreller; 951–955– 976–985–995	Gisela of Burgundy; 955–1007	Adalbert of Italy; 932–971	Hermann II of Swabia died 1003	Gerberga of Burgundy; 966–1018	Albert Azzo II of Milan; 1009–1097	Cunigunde of Altdorf c. 1020 – 1054
Otto I 954–976–982	Otto of Carinthia died 1004	Henry II; 973–995–1004– 1009–1017–1024	Cunigunde of Luxembourg; 975–1040	Henry V ?–1004–1009– 1017–1026	Sigfried I of Nordheim	Frederick of Luxembourg; 965–1019	Ermentrude of Gielberg	Liutgarde of Luxembourg; 955-c. 1005
Theophano of Rome; 955–991	Otto II, Holy Roman; Emperor; 955–983	Henry of Speyer died c. 992	Adelaide of Metz; 970–1046	Otto– William of Burgundy; 958–1026	Bernard I of Nordheim	Henry VII r. 1042–1047	Dirk III of Holland; 982–1039	Judith of Flanders c. 1033 – 1095	Welf I c. 1037 – 1070–1077– 1096–1101
EZZONEN
Matilda of Germany; 979–1025	Ezzo of Lotharingia; 955–1034	Conrad II, Holy Roman; Emperor; 990–1032	Gisela of Swabia; 990–1043	William V of Aquitaine; 969–1030	Agnes of Burgundy died 1068	Otto II of Nordheim; 1020–1061– 1070–1083	Richenza of Swabia c. 1025–1083	Swanhilde of Holland
Matilda of Tuscany; 1046–1115	Liudolf of Lotharingia; 1000–1031	Henry VI the Black; 1016–1026– 1042–1056	Agnes of Poitou; 1025–1077	Henry of Frisia c. 1055 – 1101	Gertrude of Brunswick c. 1060 – 1117	Arnold I of Loon c. 1050-c. 1130	Wulfhilde of Saxony; 1072–1116	Henry IX the Black; 1075–1120–1126	Welf II the Fat; 1072–1101–1120
Conrad I c. 1020 – 1049 – 1053–1055	Conrad II; 1052–1054–1055	Henry VIII; 1050–1053– 1054–1055– 1061–1077– 1096–1106	Bertha of Savoy; 1051–1087	Arnold II of Loon died 1146	Richenza of Nordheim c. 1088 – 1141	Lothair III, Holy Roman; Emperor; 1075–1137
Babenberg
Frederick I of Swabia c. 1050 – 1105	Agnes of Waiblingen c. 1072 – 1143	Leopold III of Austria; 1073–1136
Agnes of Saarbrücken	Frederick II of Swabia; 1090–1147	Frederick III of Pettendorf	Heilika of Swabia	Leopold II the Generous; 1108–1139–1141	Henry XI; Jasomirgott; 1112–1141– 1156–1177	Gertrude of Süpplingenburg; 1115–1143	Henry X the Proud; 1108–1126– 1138–1139
WITTELSBACH
Heilika of Pettendorf- Lengenfeld c. 1103 – 1170	Otto IV of Wittelsbach; 1083–1156	Agnes of Metz c. 1114 – 1177	Louis I of Loon c. 1107 – 1171	Conrad of the Palatinate c. 1135 – 1195	Matilda of England; 1156–1189	Henry XII the Lion; 1129–1156– 1180–1195
Berthold I of Istria c. 1116 – 1188	Otto III the Redhead; 1117–1180–1183	Agnes of Loon; 1150–1191 regent 1183–1191	Agnes of Hohenstaufen; 1176–1204	Henry V of the Palatinate; 1173–1127
Hedwig of Wittelsbach	Louis V the Kelheimer; 1173–1189–1231	Ludmilla of Bohemia died 1240
HABSBURG
Richardis of Bavaria	Cunigunde of Andechs- Merania	Gertrude of Merania; 1185–1213	Andrew II of Hungary; 1177–1235	Otto IV the Illustrious; 1206–1231–1253	Agnes of the Palatinate; 1201–1267	Rudolf I, Holy Roman; Emperor; 1218–1291	Gertrude of Hohenburg c. 1225 – 1281
Matilda of Guelders	Hildegunde of Eberstein	Béla IV of Hungary; 1206–1270	Maria; Laskarina c. 1206 – 1270	Louis VI; 1229–1253–1294	Matilda of Habsburg; 1253–1304 regent 1294–1296	Judith of Habsburg; 1271–1297	Albert I of Germany; 1255–1308
Walram II of Nassau c. 1220 – 1276	Adelheid of Katzenelnbogen	Elizabeth of Hungary; 1236–1271	Henry XIII; 1235–1253–1290	Elizabeth of Bohemia; 1292–1330	Albert II of Austria; 1298–1358
Adolf of Germany c. 1255 – 1208	Agnes; Piast	Otto V 1261–1290–1312	Louis VII; 1269–1290–1296	Judith of Jawor and Schweidnitz; 1287–1320	Stephen I 1271–1290–1310	Beatrice of Jawor and Schweidnitz	Louis VIII; 1282–1340–1347; Upper Bavaria; 1301–1340; Emperor Louis IV	Margaret II, Countess of Hainaut; 1290–1322	Margaret of Bohemia; 1296–1322	Albert III of Austria; 1349–1395
Mechtild of Nassau c. 1280 – 1323	Rudolf the Stammerer; 1274–1294–1317–1319	Henry XV of Nattenberg; 1312–1312–1331	Otto VI; 1307–1312–1334	Henry XIV the Elder; 1305–1312–1339	Margaret of Bohemia; 1313–1341	William I the Mad; 1330–1353–1389; Lower Bavaria; 1347–1353	Otto VII the Lazy; 1341–1375–1379; Upper Bavaria; 1347–1351	Louis I of Brzeg; 1321–1398
Adolf of the Palatinate; 1300–1327	Margaret; Maultasch of Tyrol; 1318–1369	Louis IX of Brandenburg; 1315–1347–1361	Barnabò; Visconti; 1321–1385	Stephen II; 1319–1353–1375; Lower Bavaria; 1347–1353	Elisabeth of Sicily; 1309–1349	John I the Child; 1329–1339–1340	Anna of Bavaria; 1326–1361	Louis X the Roman; 1328–1347–1353–1365	Albert I 1336–1353–1404; Lower Bavaria; 1347–1353	Margaret of Brzeg; 1342–1386	Albert IV of Austria; 1377–1404
Rupert II of the Palatinate; 1325–1398	Meinhard; 1344–1361–1363	Taddea; Visconti; 1351–1381	Stephen III; 1337–1392–1413; Landshut; 1375–1392	John II; 1341–1392–1397; Landshut; 1375–1392	Catherine of Gorizia died 1391	Frederick; 1339–1375–1393	Maddalena; Visconti; 1366–1404	John III the Pitiless disputed 1374–1417–1425	William II; 1365–1404–1417	Margaret of Burgundy; 1374–1441	Viridis; Visconti; 1352–1414	Leopold III of Austria; 1351–1386
Stephen of Simmern- Zweibrücken; 1385–1459	Anna of the Palatinate; 1346–1415	Rupert of the Palatinate; 1352–1410; King, 1400	Anne of Bourbon and La Marche; 1380–1408	Louis XI the Bearded; 1368–1413– 1443–1447	Elisabeth; Visconti; 1372–1432	Ernest; 1373–1397–1438	William III; 1375–1397–1435	Henry XVI the Rich; 1386–1393–1450	Margaret of Austria; 1395–1447	Jacqueline disputed 1401–1417– 1432–1436	Ernest the Iron of Austria; 1377–1424
Louis I of Zweibrücken; 1424–1489	Jeanne of Croÿ; 1435–1504	Louis III of the Palatinate; 1378–1436	Louis XII the Hunchback; 1403–1443–1445	Anna of Brunswick- Grubenhagen; 1414–1474	Albert III the Pious; 1401–1438–1460	Eleanor of Portugal; 1434–1467	Frederick III, Holy Roman; Emperor; 1415–1493	Margaret of Austria; 1416–1486
Alexander of Zweibrücken; 1462–1514	Philip I of Hesse; 1504–1567	Louis IV of the Palatinate; 1424–1449	Margaret of Bavaria; 1442–1479	John IV; 1437–1460–1463	Sigismund; 1439–1467–1501; Munich; 1460–1467	Albert IV; 1447–1503–1508; Munich; 1467–1503	Kunigunde of Austria; 1465–1520	Louis XIII the Rich; 1417–1450–1479	Amalia of Saxony; 1436–1501
Louis II of Zweibrücken; 1502–1532	Elisabeth of Hesse; 1503–1563	Clara; Gonzaga; 1464–1503	Philip of the Palatinate; 1448–1508	Louis XIV; 1495–1508–1545	Maximilian I, Holy Roman; Emperor; 1459–1519	George the Rich; 1455–1479–1503
Wolfgang of Zweibrücken; 1526–1569	Anna of Hesse; 1529–1591	Renée of Bourbon; 1494–1593	Antoine of Lorraine; 1489–1–1544	Elisabeth of the Palatinate; 1483–1522	Philip I of Castile; 1478–1506
Isabella of Austria; 1501–1526	Maria Jacobea of Baden- Sponheim; 1507–1580	William IV the Steadfast; 1493–1508–1550	Ferdinand I, Holy Roman; Emperor; 1503–1564	Charles V, Holy Roman; Emperor; 1500–1558
William I of Jülich- Cleves-Berg; 1516–1592	Maria of Austria; 1531–1581	Francis I of Lorraine; 1517–1545	Christina of Denmark; 1521–1590	Albert V the Magnanimous; 1528–1550–1579	Anna of Austria; 1528–1590	Joanna of Austria; 1547–1578	Philip II of Spain; 1527–1598
John I of Zweibrücken; 1550–1604	Magdalene of Jülich- Cleves-Berg; 1533–1633	Philip Louis of Neuburg; 1547–1614	Anna of Jülich- Cleves-Berg; 1552–1632	Charles III of Lorraine; 1543–1608	Claude of France; 1547–1575	Renata of Lorraine; 1544–1602	William V the Pious; 1548–1579– 1597–1628	Maria Anna of Bavaria; 1551–1608	Charles II of Austria; 1540–1590	Maria Anna of Bavaria; 1551–1608	Catherine; Michaela of Spain; 1567–1597
John II of Zweibrücken; 1584–1635	Charles I of Zweibrücken- Birkenfeld; 1560–1600	Wolfgang; William of Neuburg; 1578–1653	Magdalene of Bavaria; 1587–1628	John William of Jülich- Cleves-Berg; 1562–1609	Antonia of Lorraine; 1568–1610	Maria Anna of Bavaria; 1574–1616	Ferdinand II, Holy Roman; Emperor; 1578–1637	Christine of France; 1606–1663	Victor; Amadeus I of Savoy; 1587–1637	Philip III of Spain; 1578–1621	Margaret of Austria; 1584–1611
Magdalene; Catherine of Zweibrücken; 1607–1648	Christian I of Birkenfeld- Bischweiler; 1598–1654	Philip; William of Neuburg; 1615–1690	Elisabeth; Amaile of Hesse- Darmstadt; 1635–1709	John III; Sobieski of Poland; 1629–1696	Elisabeth of Lorraine; 1574–1635	Maximilian I the Great; 1573–1597–1651	Maria Anna of Austria; 1610–1665	Ferdinand III, Holy Roman; Emperor; 1608–1657	Maria Anna of Spain; 1606–1646
Christian II of Zweibrücken; 1637–1717	Augustus of Sulzbach; 1582–1632	Hedwig; Elisabeth of Neuburg; 1673–1722	James Louis; Sobieski; 1667–1737	Ludwika; Karolina; Radziwiłł; 1667–1696	Charles III; Philip of Neuburg; 1661–1742	Ferdinand; Maria; 1636–1651–1679	Henriette; Adelaide of Savoy; 1636–1676	Maria Anna of Austria; 1634–1696	Philip IV of Spain; 1605–1665
Christian; Augustus of Sulzbach; 1622–1708	Eleonor; Magdalene of Neuburg; 1655–1720	Leopold I, Holy Roman; Emperor; 1640–1705	Margaret; Theresa of Spain; 1651–1673
Christian III of Zweibrücken; 1674–1735	Theodore; Eustace of Sulzbach; 1659–1732	Theresa; Cunigunde; Sobieska of Poland; 1676–1730	Maximilian II; Emanuel; 1662–1679–1726	Maria; Antonia of Austria; 1669–1692	Joseph I, Holy Roman; Emperor; 1678–1711	Wilhelmine; Amaila of Brunswick- Lüneburg; 1673–1742
Caroline of Zweibrücken; 1721–1774	Joseph; Charles of Sulzbach; 1694–1726	Elisabeth; Augusta; Sofia of Neuburg; 1693–1728	John; Christian of Sulzbach; 1700–1733	Maria; Henrietta de la Tour d'Auvergne; 1708–1728	Charles; Albert; 1697–1726–1745; Emp Charles VII, 1742	Maria Amalia of Brunswick- Lüneburg; 1701–1756	Augustus III of Poland; 1696–1763	Maria; Josepha of Saxony; 1699–1757
Frederick; Michael of Zweibrücken; 1724–1767	Maria; Franziska of Sulzbach; 1724–1794	Frederick; William II of Prussia; 1744–1797	Elisabeth; Augusta of Sulzbach; 1721–1794	Charles; Theodore; 1724–1777–1799	Francis I, Holy Roman; Emperor; 1708–1765	Maria; Theresa of Austria; 1717–1780	Maximilian III; Joseph; 1727–1745–1777	Maria Anna; Sophia of Saxony; 1728–1797
Amalie of Hesse- Darmstadt; 1754–1832	Charles; Louis of Baden; 1755–1801	Frederick; William III of Prussia; 1770–1840	Leopold II, Holy Roman; Emperor; 1747–1790	Maria Luisa of Spain; 1745–1792	Ferdinand I of the Two; Sicilies; 1751–1825	Maria; Carolina of Austria; 1752–1814	Ferdinand; Charles of Austria-Este; 1754–1806	Maria; Beatrice of Este; 1750–1829
Caroline of Baden; 1776–1841	Maximilian IV; Joseph; 1756–1799–1825	Augusta; Wilhemine of Hesse- Darmstadt; 1765–1796	Wilhelm of Prussia; 1783–1851	Ferdinand III of Tuscany; 1769–1824	Luisa of Naples and Sicily; 1773–1802	Joseph of Hungary; 1776–1847	Francis IV of Modena; 1779–1846
Frederick; William IV of Prussia; 1795–1861	Elisabeth; Ludovika of Bavaria; 1801–1873	Ludwig I 1786–1825–1848–1868	Theresa of Saxe- Hildburghausen; 1792–1854	Maria Anna of Saxony; 1799–1832	Leopold II of Tuscany; 1797–1870	Ludovika of Bavaria; 1808–1892	Elisbath; Franziska of Austria; 1831–1903	Charles; Victor of Austria-Este; 1821–1849	Amalia; Augusta of Bavaria; 1801–1877
Maximilian V 1811–1848–1864	Marie of Prussia; 1825–1889	Luitpold; 1821–1912 regent 1886–1912	Augusta; Ferdinande of Austria; 1825–1864	Charles; Theodore of Bavaria; 1839–1909	Sophie of Saxony; 1845–1867
Ludwig II the Fairy; Tale King; 1845–1864–1886	Otto (VIII); 1848–1886– 1913–1916	Ludwig III; 1845–1913– 1918 regent 1912–1913	Maria; Theresa of Austria-Este; 1849–1919
