= Agnes of Bavaria =

Agnes of Bavaria may refer to:

- Agnes of Bavaria, Margravine of Brandenburg (1276–1345), daughter of Louis II, Duke of Upper Bavaria
- Agnes of Bavaria (nun) (1335–1352), daughter of Louis IV, Duke of Upper Bavaria
