= Margaret of Bohemia =

Margaret of Bohemia may refer to:

- Dagmar of Bohemia (also known as Margaret; 1186-1212/13), daughter of Ottokar I of Bohemia and Adelheid of Meissen, married to Valdemar II of Denmark
- Margaret of Bohemia, Duchess of Wroclaw (1296-1322), daughter of Wenceslaus II of Bohemia and Judith of Habsburg, married Bolesław III the Generous
- Margaret of Bohemia, Duchess of Bavaria (1313-1341), daughter of John the Blind and Elisabeth I of Bohemia, married Henrich XIV of Bavaria
- Margaret of Bohemia, Queen of Hungary (1335-1349), daughter of Charles IV, Holy Roman Emperor, and Blanche of Valois, married Louis I of Hungary
- Margaret of Bohemia, Burgravine of Nuremberg (1373-1410), daughter of Charles IV, Holy Roman Emperor, and Elizabeth of Pomerania, married John III, Burgrave of Nuremberg
