= Richardis of Jülich =

Richardis of Jülich (c. 1314–1360) was a daughter of Gerhard V of Jülich and Elisabeth of Brabant-Aarschot. She married Otto IV, Duke of Lower Bavaria, son of Stephen I, Duke of Bavaria, with whom she had one child: Albert of Wittelsbach, who was born in 1332. He predeceased his father. Her husband died in 1334.

| Preceded by Agnes of Glogau | Duchess of Lower Bavaria; 1330–1334 | Succeeded by Margaret of Bohemia, Duchess of Bavaria |
