= Louis IV, Holy Roman Emperor =

Holy Roman Emperor from 1328 to 1347

Louis IV
- Imperator Romanorum
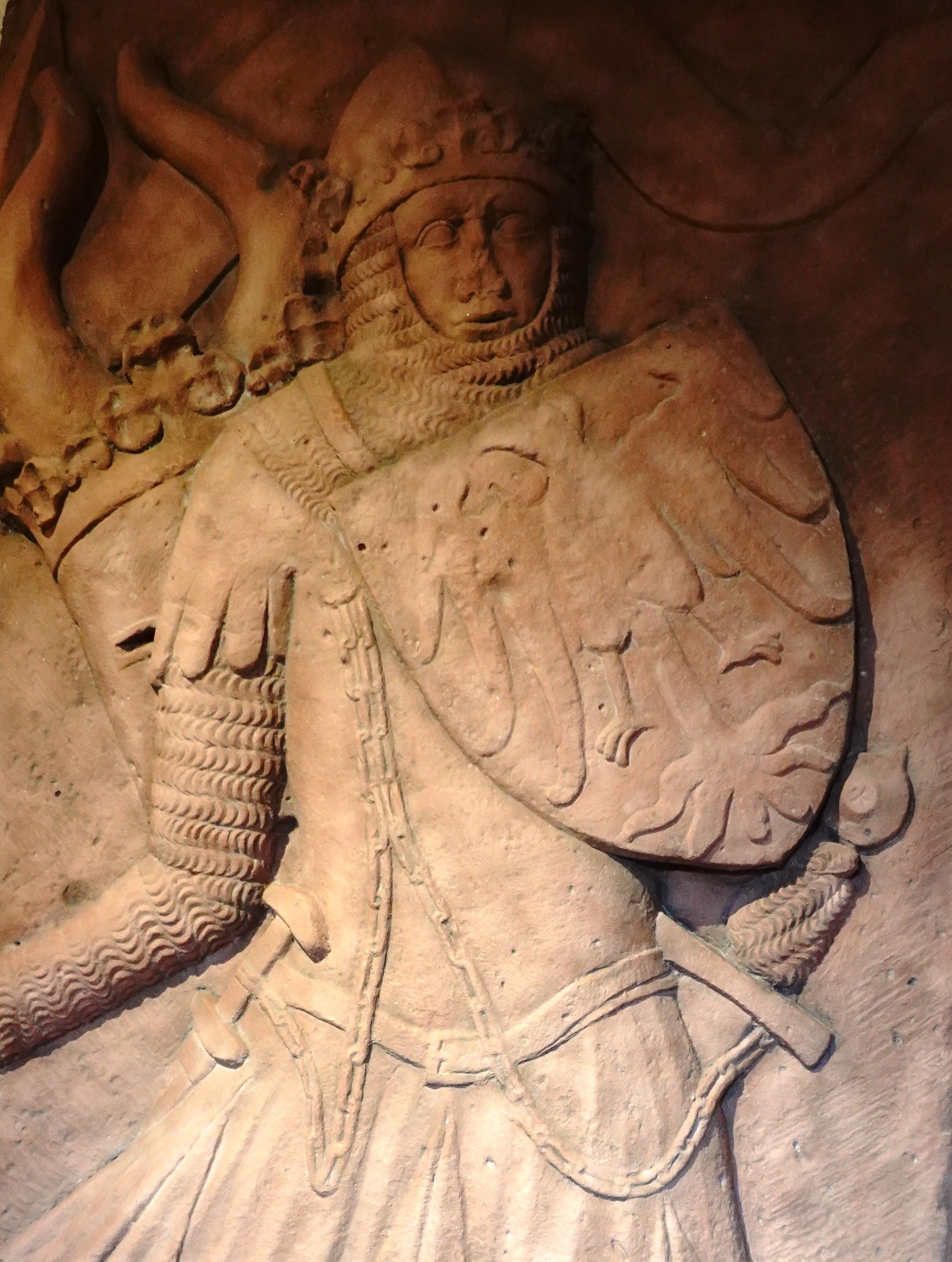
- Relief of Louis IV in the Landesmuseum Mainz, c. 1330

King of the Romans King of Germany until 1330 with Frederick the Handsome
- Reign: 20 October 1314 – 11 October 1347
- Coronation: 25 November 1314 (Aachen)
- Predecessor: Henry VII
- Successor: Charles IV

King of Italy
- Reign: 31 May 1327 – 11 October 1347
- Coronation: 31 May 1327 (Milan)
- Predecessor: Henry VII
- Successor: Charles IV

Holy Roman Emperor
- Reign: 1328 – 11 October 1347
- Coronation: 17 January 1328 (Rome)
- Predecessor: Henry VII
- Successor: Charles IV

Duke of Bavaria until 1317 with Rudolf I
- Reign: 1301 – 11 October 1347
- Predecessor: Rudolf I
- Successor: Louis V, Stephen II, Louis VI, William I, Albert I and Otto V
- Born: 1 April 1282; Munich, Duchy of Bavaria, Holy Roman Empire
- Died: 11 October 1347 (aged 65); Puch, near Fürstenfeldbruck, Duchy of Bavaria
- Spouses: Beatrix of Świdnica (m. 1308; died 1322) Margaret II, Countess of Holland (m. 1324)
- Issue more...: Matilda, Margravine of Meissen; Louis V, Duke of Bavaria; Stephen II, Duke of Bavaria; Margaret, Duchess of Slavonia; Louis II, Elector of Brandenburg; William I, Duke of Bavaria; Agnes of Bavaria; Albert I, Duke of Bavaria; Otto, Elector of Brandenburg
- House: Wittelsbach
- Father: Louis II, Duke of Bavaria
- Mother: Matilda of Habsburg

Arms of the House of Wittelsbach (14th-century).

Arms of Louis IV as Holy Roman Emperor.

Louis IV (German: Ludwig; 1 April 1282 – 11 October 1347), called the Bavarian (Ludwig der Bayer, Latin: Ludovicus Bavarus), was King of the Romans from 1314, King of Italy from 1327, and Holy Roman Emperor from 1328 until his death in 1347.

Louis' election as king of Germany in 1314 was controversial, as his Habsburg cousin Frederick the Fair was simultaneously elected king by a separate set of electors. Louis defeated Frederick in the Battle of Mühldorf in 1322, and the two eventually reconciled. Louis was opposed and excommunicated by the French Pope John XXII; Louis in turn attempted to depose the pope and install an anti-pope.

Louis IV was Duke of Upper Bavaria from 1294 to 1301 together with his elder brother Rudolf I, was Margrave of Brandenburg until 1323, and Count Palatine of the Rhine until 1329, and became Duke of Lower Bavaria in 1340. He was the last Bavarian to be a king of Germany until 1742. He became Count of Hainaut, Holland, Zeeland, and Friesland in 1345 when his wife Margaret inherited those domains.

== Origins and Youth ==
Louis was born in Munich, the son of Louis II, Duke of Upper Bavaria and Count Palatine of the Rhine, and Matilda, a daughter of King Rudolph I. As a member of the noble house of Wittelsbach, his great-great-grandfather, Otto, was given the duchy of Bavaria for his services to Frederick Barbarossa. As a result, Louis and his family enjoyed a close relationship with the Hohenstaufen dynasty, who not only acted as political allies to the Wittelsbachs, but also as family members through Elizabeth of Bavaria's marriage to Conrad IV of Germany.

Louis's father, Louis the Strict, went to great pains to ensure the Wittelsbach family would be closely intermarried with the other magnates of the empire. For example, at the coronation of Rudolf of Habsburg, Louis the Strict managed to negotiate a marriage to his daughter, Matilda. Due to his ties with the Habsburg dynasty, Louis IV was raised at the court of Albert of Habsburg. As a result, he was educated alongside his playmate Frederick the Fair, who would later become his rival in the struggle for the German throne. Ludwig's father died in 1294, and on the 14th of October 1308, he married the Piast princess Beatrice of Silesia.

In 1310, there was a dispute between the brothers over the inheritance of their father, Louis the Strict. He divided his realm so that Louis IV would rule with his brother Rudolf I in the Electoral Palatinate and the Duchy of Upper Bavaria. In Lower Bavaria, after the death of Stephen I on December 1310, tensions broke out with Louis and the Habsburgs over the succession. Even though Otto III, the former King of Hungary, had chosen Louis, local nobles instead appointed Frederick the Fair as the legal guardian of Stephen's children, Otto IV and Henry XIV. This led to conflict between Louis and Frederick, although he soon made a major change of course: In the Peace of Munich on the 21st of June 1313, he made peace with his brother and agreed a method of joint rulership for Upper Bavaria.

The peace was only intended to last one year, but Louis used this period to maneuver carefully with the aims of defeating Frederick. Louis promptly resumed hostilities, eventually defeating Frederick in the Battle of Gammelsdorf in November of that same year, despite Leopold I sending aid to Frederick. This victory caused a stir within the Holy Roman Empire and increased the reputation of the Bavarian Duke, and forced Frederick to surrender the tutelage of the young dukes.

== Election as German King and conflict with Frederick the Fair ==
The death of Holy Roman Emperor Henry VII in August 1313 led to a 14-month long election period between the seven prince-Electors. Henry's son John, King of Bohemia since 1310, was initially supported by the Bohemians alongside their allies Archbishop Peter of Aspelt of Mainz and Archbishop Baldwin of Luxembourg of Trier. Philip IV of France, who had already had relatives on the thrones of Hungary and Naples, wanted to ensure the election of his son Philip as Holy Roman Emperor after failing the previous election. With Philip being entirely unsupported by the Imperial princes yet again, John's position was initially strong.

However, believing John of Bohemia to be too young and the Luxembourg dynasty too powerful, the Habsburgs pushed forth with the only realistic resistance to the pro-Luxembourg faction. As the son of Emperor Henry's predecessor, Albert I, Frederick the Fair began gathering support for his cause. This intimidated the pro-Luxembourg faction, causing the Archbishops of Mainz and Trier to convince John to step down and settle on Louis as a compromise candidate for Emperor in order to prevent their Habsburg rivals from attaining the Imperial throne.

On 19 October 1314, Archbishop Henry II of Cologne chaired an assembly of four electors at Sachsenhausen, south of Frankfurt. Participants were Louis' brother, Rudolph I of the Palatinate, who objected to the election of his younger brother, Duke Rudolph I of Saxe-Wittenberg, and Henry of Carinthia, whom the Luxembourgs had deposed as King of Bohemia. These four electors chose Frederick as King.

The Luxembourg party did not accept this election and the next day a second election was held. Upon the instigation of Peter of Aspelt, Archbishop of Mainz, five different electors convened at Frankfurt and elected Louis as King. These electors were Archbishop Peter himself, Archbishop Baldwin of Trier and King John of Bohemia – both of the House of Luxembourg – Margrave Waldemar of Brandenburg and Duke John II of Saxe-Lauenburg, who contested Rudolph of Wittenberg's claim to the electoral vote.

This double election was quickly followed by two coronations on the 25th of November: Louis was crowned at Aachen – the customary site of coronations – by Archbishop Peter of Mainz, while the Archbishop of Cologne, who by custom had the right to crown the new king, crowned Frederick at Bonn. Ludwig did not have the authentic Imperial Regalia, and so needed to have replicas created in an attempt to legitimise his coronation. Chroniclers on both sides attempted to portray their rival's coronation as illegitimate. For example, in the anti-Habsburg Chronica Ludovici, Frederick is depicted as being raised on a barrel on his coronation, before falling inside it. In the following conflict between the kings, Louis recognized in 1316 the independence of Switzerland from the Habsburg dynasty.

The fraught political situation was ripe for papal intervention. Pope Clement V died on the 20th of April 1314, half a year before the kings were elected. The throne of St. Peter would remain empty for two more years. Without a religious authority to adjudicate, both sides instead came to believe that God favoured whichever side won on the battlefield. However, despite this belief, the kings were reluctant to actually take to combat between 1314 and 1322. Frederick the Fair's defeat at the Battle of Morgarten gave him further cause for restraint in the struggle for the throne. Regardless of this apprehension, minor skirmishes took place between the two sides in this period: Speyer and Buchloe in 1315, Esslingen in 1316, Mühldorf in 1319, and Strasbourg in 1320. No major battle had yet taken place, however. The next few years, however, were unfortunate for Louis. Neither side was able to take advantage of the death of Waldemar, Margrave of Brandenburg-Stendal, and after the death of the Archbishop of Mainz, Pope John XXII appointed Matthias von Bucheck, a follower of the Habsburgs, as his successor. Previously, the Papacy had not taken sides in the conflict - but in 1316, Pope John officially expressed his opposition to Louis IV. Supported by both the Pope his brother Leopold, Frederick's victory seemed within grasp.

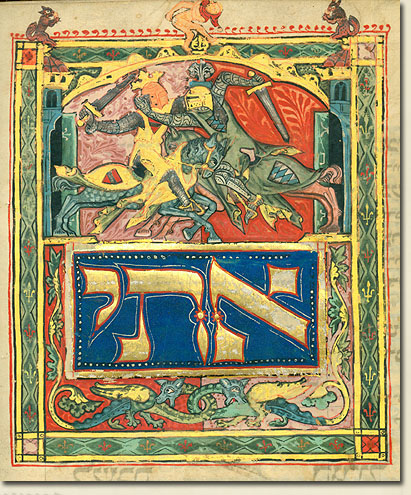
The Battle of Mühldorf portrayed as a duel between Frederick and Louis in a Jewish manuscript.

A few weeks before the deciding battle of the war, Louis's first wife Beatrix died on August 1322. Three of his six children from this marriage had reached adulthood: Matilda, Louis, and Stephen. On the 28th of September 1322, Frederick's army was decisively defeated in the Battle of Mühldorf at Ampfing Heath, where Frederick and 1300 nobles from Austria and Salzburg were captured. Louis's ally Frederick contributed greatly to the victory, and it is also believed that the Fürstenfeld Abbey played a vital role in secretly sending messages to Louis's army. As a result of the abbey's aid, it was granted special privileges by Louis out of gratitude.

Louis held Frederick captive in Trausnitz Castle (Schwandorf) for three years, but his reign was far from secure. The Pope, angered by Louis' use of the title King of the Romans without Papal approval, as well as his granting of offices and estates in Northern Italy without consulting the Papal States, warned Louis that he had three months to abdicate and revoke all his decrees. Upon his failure to comply, Pope John XXII excommunicated Louis. Louis reacted by making three appeals: The Nuremberg Appeal in 1323, the Frankfurt Appeal in January 1324, and the Sachsenhausen Appeal in May 1324. He insisted that the Electors had chosen him as Emperor, making his rule righteous. However, these pleas were not paid any heed by the Pope. Instead, he ordered Louis to give up his kingship, and threatened to excommunicate his followers, take away his imperial fiefs, and even his original Duchy of Bavaria if he did not comply. Frederick's brother, Leopold, sought to take advantage of the situation, and began to organise his banner as the honorable resistance to Louis' rule.

In light of the recent retreat of John of Bohemia from the alliance, as well as the Papal excommunication and resistance from the Habsburgs, Louis attempted to come to a compromise. On the 13th of March 1325, Louis freed the imprisoned Frederick, and in a secret agreement, made Frederick renounce the crown and any Habsburg imperial fiefs. Furthermore, he had to accept that Louis was the legal custodian of the young Wittelsbach brothers. After Frederick accepted these terms, he was freed from captivity. Frederick did not have to pay a ransom, although he was forced to part with all of his Imperial possessions. The Peace of Trausnitz between Louis and Frederick was made with both signature and verbal agreement, and was made formally at Easter. The two heard Mass and received communion together. The value of oaths was very high in the Medieval period, and thus Frederick made a great concerted effort to genuinely reconcile with Louis. Part of this reconciliation involved a promise that he would voluntarily return to prison if he did not convince his brothers to submit to Louis. He also agreed to oppose the Pope for excommunicating Louis, and arranged a marriage between Louis's son Stephen and Frederick's daughter Elizabeth.

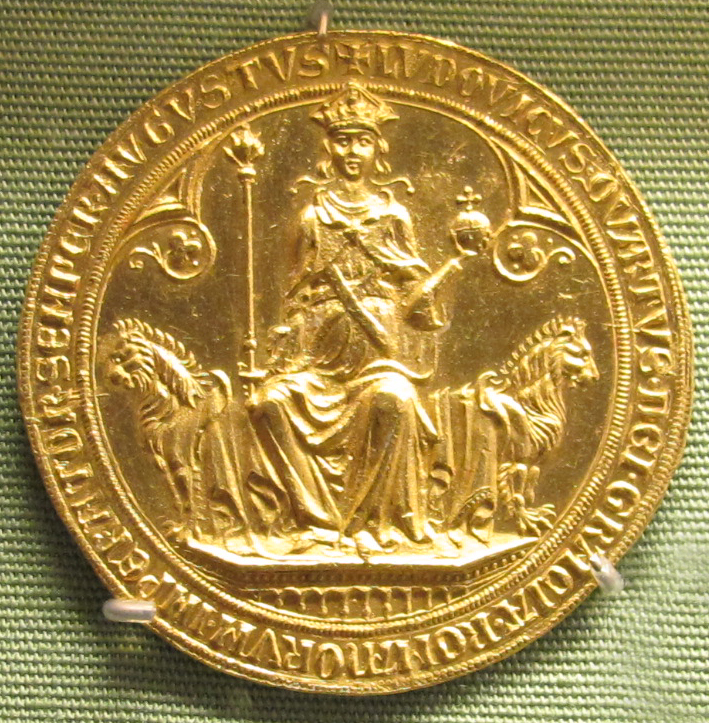
Golden Bull of Louis IV 1328

== Dual Kingship ==
As he did not manage to overcome Leopold's obstinacy, Frederick returned to Munich as a prisoner, even though the Pope had released him from his oath. Louis, who was impressed by such nobility, renewed the old friendship with Frederick, and they agreed to rule the Empire jointly. Since the Pope and the electors strongly objected to this agreement, another treaty was signed at Ulm on 7 January 1326, according to which Frederick would administer Germany as King of the Romans, while Louis would be crowned as Holy Roman Emperor in Italy. Such a system of dividing kingship had never been seen before in the Holy Roman Empire, and it would never truly be repeated again in Imperial history. Louis also took further action in order to placate Leopold, and sought the advice of Frederick the Fair in secret meetings in order to achieve these ends. As a result, Leopold was appointed as an imperial vicar, with the aim of ensuring his loyalty to the two kings. This was short lived, however - after Leopold's death in 1326, Frederick withdrew from the regency of the Empire and returned to rule only Austria. He died on 13 January 1330.

Historians debate why Louis underwent such an unprecedented measure. German historian Heinz Thomas doubted that Louis's offer was genuine, and believed it was a tactical move to curry favour with the Habsburgs, especially Frederick's unwilling brother Leopold. Other historians, such as Michael Menzel, Martin Clauss, and Roland Pauler argue that Louis made the agreement in good faith, and genuinely wanted to rule alongside Frederick. Menzel writes that the treaty was in fact a tactical maneouvre against Pope John XXII, and that by using the legitimacy of the Electors rather than the decrees of the Pope as grounds for deriving legitimate kingship, Imperial power would be strengthened. By creating an alliance between the Wittelsbachs and the Habsburgs, the two powers were able to stabilise the north of the Alps in order to have a foundation with which to interfere in Italian politics. This was especially important, as Louis's predecessor marched troops into Italy to crown himself King of Italy and crush local rebels.

For years, the dual kingship was shaped by consensus in both political and symbolic affairs. The two rulers were regarded as brothers. In doing so, they depicted themselves as equal partners who propped each other up with mutual support. By operating under a dual-kingship, Louis eschewed the conventional medieval representation of kingship which stated that only one man could rule. At the investiture ceremony, the prince-electors swore fealty to both kings, a new seal was created to represent the dual-kingship, and the kings addressed themselves as "co-king". During the dual kingship period, the two kings expressed their co-rule through political cooperation as well as monarchical symbolism. They referred to each other as king, ate and drank together, and even shared a bed. The two ensured that any ceremonial expression was clearly demarcated in a way that embodied dual kingship. The introduction of this novel concept of dual-kingship was designed as a way of maintaining peace, as the Munich Treaty did not explicitly outline the way the concept would be introduced. Important aspects such as coinage and diplomacy with the prince-electors was notably left out of the agreement. The Pope, meanwhile, declared the treaty between the two kings to be invalid.

The dual kingship did not last long. On the 7th of January 1326, Louis declared that he was willing to relinquish his royal rights if Frederick was given Papal approval before the 26th of July that year. However, due to stalling by the Pope, this did not come to pass. Louis used this offer of abdication as a way to gather the support of the princes and subjects of the Empire, knowing that the Pope would hesitate to support Frederick due to his proximity to Louis. Thus, by making a proposition for peace that the Papacy would not accent, the Pope would come across as obstinate and hard-hearted, thus giving Louis reasonable pretext to call his subjects to arms. The last time the two kings encountered each other was as guests of Henry of Bohemia in Innsbruck, where Louis and Frederick ran into tensions that stood in the way of the dual-kingship. In February 1327, Louis contravened the Munich treaty by appointing Henry as the imperial vicar, thereby removing Frederick from the post.

== Coronation as Holy Roman Emperor and conflict with the Pope ==
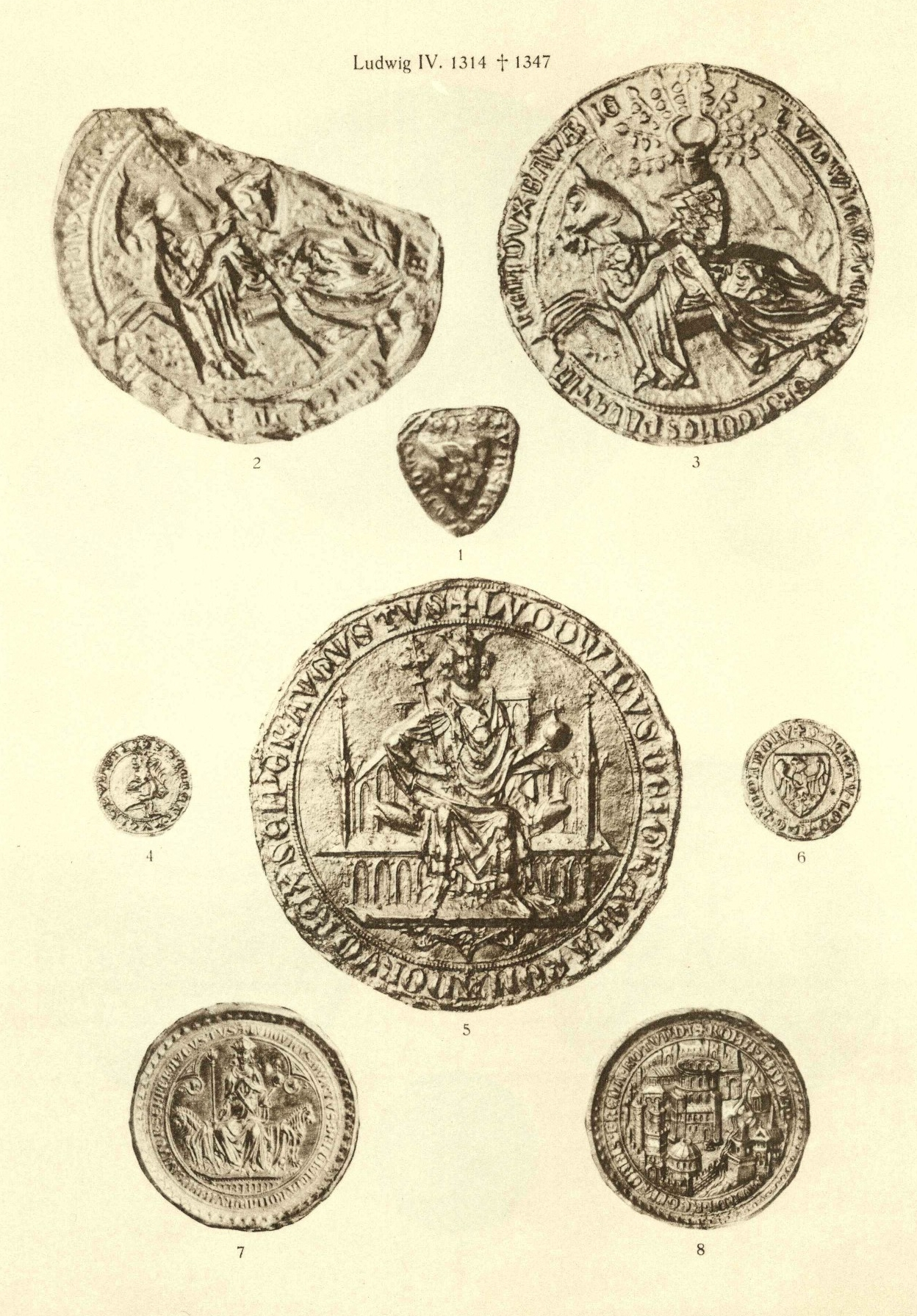
Seals of Louis IV (Otto Posse 1909)

The political situation of Italy in the late Middle Ages was complicated. The Kingdom of Italy consisted of northern Italy, except for the Republic of Venice. The kingdom belonged formally to the Holy Roman Empire, although the Emperor struggled to exert his authority there during the 13th and 14th centuries. The various city-states of Northern Italy were intermittently involved in conflicts between Guelphs and Ghibellines, wherein allegiances were split between the Pope and the Holy Roman Emperor. There was no strong division of ideological or cultural lines that caused the division between the two sides, causing Italian politics to be fluid. Instead, most rulers in the region tended to support their own interests, and were open to outside influence. The Italienzug of Louis's predecessor had been the first one in over half a century, and so many imperially-aligned Italian rulers sought to curry favour with Louis before the break in relations with the Pope. In the past, Henry VII's plans to stabilise Italy had been shattered by his untimely death, which had caused the Empire to lose significant influence in the region.

The situation was further complicated by the Avignon Papacy, where the Pope was under heavy influence from the Kingdom of France. The Pope functioned as ruler of the Papal State while the south of the peninsula was under the rule of the Kingdom of Naples. John XXII did not recognise the Imperial claims to the Kingdom of Italy, and declared the anti-Imperial Robert of Anjou to be vicar of Lombardy and Tuscany. As a result, the pro-Imperial factions came to face further resistance for their campaign into Italy.

After the reconciliation with the Habsburgs in 1326, Louis marched to Italy and was crowned with the Iron Crown as King of Italy in Milan on the Pentecost of 1327, with the intention of using his presence to undermine the Guelphs. Already in 1323, Louis had sent an army to Italy to protect Milan against the Kingdom of Naples, which was together with France the strongest ally of the papacy. But now the Lord of Milan Galeazzo I Visconti was deposed since he was suspected of conspiring with the pope. The Pope reacted against Louis with further measures, such as renouncing his honours as the Duke of Bavaria, and declaring him a heretic. In Papal correspondence, Louis is deridingly referred to as Ludovicus Bavarus (Louis the Bavarian). In doing so, he denied his every rank and title, but this did not prevent Louis from undergoing his Italienzug. Louis faced fewer adversities during his Italienzug than his predecessor Henry VII, as Louis did not enter Italy with the intentions of instituting wide-reaching installations of Imperial power.

In January 1328, Louis entered Rome, where he was met by a jubilant populace. He had himself crowned emperor by the aged senator Sciarra Colonna, called captain of the Roman people, who served as Louis's link between the nobility and the commoners of Rome. To this end, Sciarra created an alliance of the major noble families of the city as well as popular leaders in order to create an alliance that crossed class barriers, and that would ensure support for the Emperor. For the coronation, Louis invited three bishops and four syndics to St. Peter's Basilica to take part in his coronation. Thus, while Louis's enemies claimed that his coronation had been without spiritual or popular legitimacy, Louis was able to easily refute his critics. After his coronation, Louis spoke of how his Imperial power descended directly from God. Louis's imperial seal depicts him with a stole and cope. These depictions first appear after his coronation in Rome in opposition to the Pope, portraying himself as a holy figure despite his conflict with the papacy.

On the 18th of April 1328, Louis published a decree declaring Pope John XXII (Jacques Duèze), who resided in Avignon, deposed on grounds of heresy. He then installed a Spiritual Franciscan, Pietro Rainalducci as antipope Nicholas V in hopes of legitimising his imperial rule. However, Nicholas served little consequence as Pope, and left Rome. In 1330, Nicholas relinquished his position, and submitted to Pope John XXII.

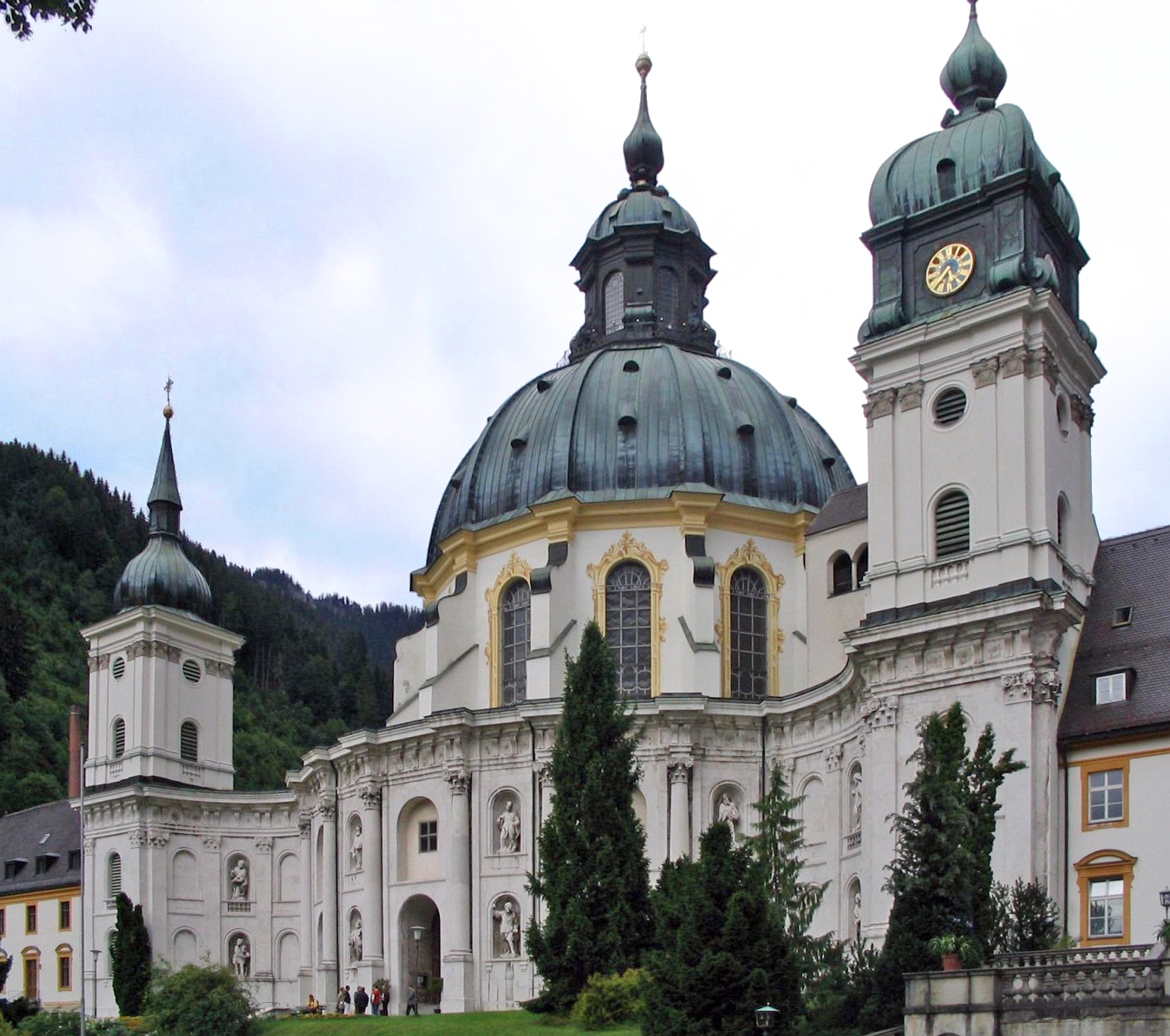
Ettal Abbey, founded by Emperor Louis on his return from Rome.

Louis also used his Italienzug as an opportunity to solve inheritance disputes within the family by concluding the Treaty of Pavia with his nephews Rupert I and Rudolf II. In the treaty, he gave the Palatinate to the two dukes, and inherited both Upper and Lower Bavaria for himself. In case of the extinction of one of the two lines, the other would inherit. The two lines would remain separated until the extinction of the Bavarian line in 1777. In February 1330, Louis returned from his journey in Rome, having become sole ruler of the Empire after the death of Frederick the Fair in January. Frederick had hardly been able to execute any policies in Louis's absence. At the end of his Italienzug, Louis founded Ettal Abbey in Oberammergau at an important Alpine crossing point.

In a deed dated to the 13th of November 1333, Louis made a proposal to Henry XIV, Duke of Bavaria suggesting that Louis would abdicate the throne of Bavaria, and recognise his brother as king whilst maintaining the Imperial throne. Louis's plan to abdicate only the kingship was a diplomatic maneouvre intended to court the favour and sympathy of both Pope John XXII and the imperial princes, painting himself as a reasonable actor in order to win over their sympathy.

In the meantime, Robert, King of Naples had sent both a fleet and an army against Louis and his ally Frederick II of Sicily. Louis spent the winter 1328/29 in Pisa and stayed then in Northern Italy. When his co-ruler Frederick of Habsburg died in 1330, Louis returned from Italy. In fulfillment of an oath, Louis founded Ettal Abbey on 28 April 1330.

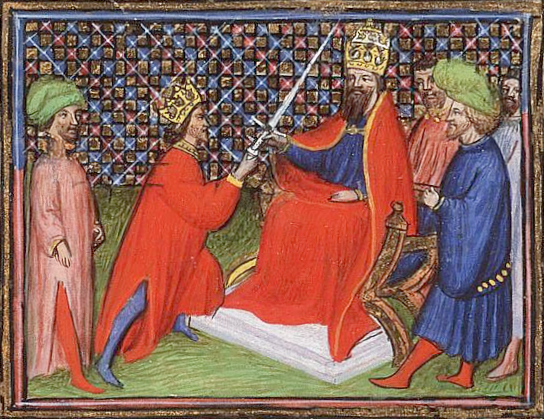
Edward III becomes Vicar to the Emperor Louis IV.

Franciscan theologians Michael of Cesena and William of Ockham, and the philosopher Marsilius of Padua, who were all on bad terms with the Pope as well, joined Emperor Louis in Italy and accompanied him to his court at Alter Hof in Munich which became the first imperial residence of the Holy Roman Empire.

In 1333, Emperor Louis sought to counter French influence in the southwest of the empire so he offered Humbert II of Viennois the Kingdom of Arles which was an opportunity to gain full authority over Savoy, Provence, and its surrounding territories. Humbert was reluctant to take the crown due to the conflict that would follow with all around him, so he declined, telling the emperor that he should make peace with the church first.

Emperor Louis also allied with King Edward III of England in 1337 against King Philip VI of France, the protector of the new Pope Benedict XII in Avignon. King Philip VI had prevented any agreement between the Emperor and the Pope. Thus, the failure of negotiations with the papacy led to the declaration at Rhense in 1338 by six electors to the effect that election by all or the majority of the electors automatically conferred the royal title and rule over the empire, without papal confirmation. King Edward III was the Emperor's guest at the Imperial Diet in the Kastorkirche at Coblence in 1338 and was named Vicar-General of the Holy Roman Empire. However in 1341, the Emperor deserted Edward III but came to terms with Philip VI only temporarily. For the expected English payments were missing and Louis intended to reach an agreement with the Pope one more time.

== Imperial privileges ==
Louis IV was a protector of the Teutonic Knights. In 1337 he allegedly bestowed upon the Teutonic Order a privilege to conquer Lithuania and Russia, although the Order had only petitioned for three small territories. Later he forbade the Order to stand trial before foreign courts in their territorial conflicts with foreign rulers.

Louis concentrated his energies also on the economic development of the cities of the empire, so his name can be found in many city chronicles for the privileges he granted. In 1330 the emperor for example permitted the Frankfurt Trade Fair, and in 1340 Lübeck, as the leading member of the Hanseatic League, received the coinage prerogative for golden gulden.

== Dynastic policy ==
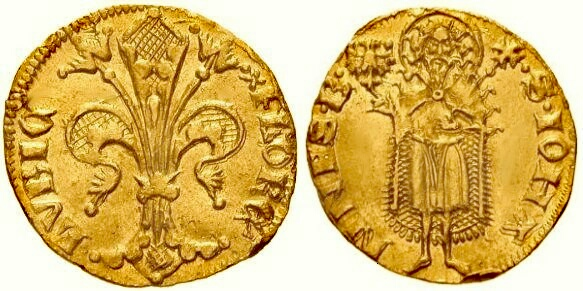
Gold Gulden of Lübeck, 1341

In 1323 Louis gave Brandenburg as a fiefdom to his eldest son Louis V after the Brandenburg branch of the House of Ascania had died out. With the Treaty of Pavia in 1329 the emperor reconciled the sons of his late brother Rudolph and returned the Palatinate to his nephews Rudolf and Rupert. After the death of Henry of Bohemia, the duchy of Carinthia was released as an imperial fief on 2 May 1335 in Linz to his Habsburg cousins Albert II, Duke of Austria, and Otto, Duke of Austria, while Tyrol was first placed into Luxemburg hands.

With the death of duke John I in 1340 Louis inherited Lower Bavaria and then reunited the duchy of Bavaria. John's mother, a member of the Luxemburg dynasty, had to return to Bohemia. In 1342 Louis also acquired Tyrol for the Wittelsbach by voiding the first marriage of Margarete Maultasch with John Henry of Bohemia and marrying her to his own son Louis V, thus alienating the House of Luxemburg even more.

In 1345 the emperor further antagonized the lay princes by conferring Hainaut, Holland, Zeeland, and Friesland upon his wife, Margaret II of Hainaut. The hereditary titles of Margaret's sisters, one of whom was the queen of England, were ignored. Because of the dangerous hostility of the Luxemburgs, Louis had increased his power base ruthlessly.

== Conflict with Luxembourg ==
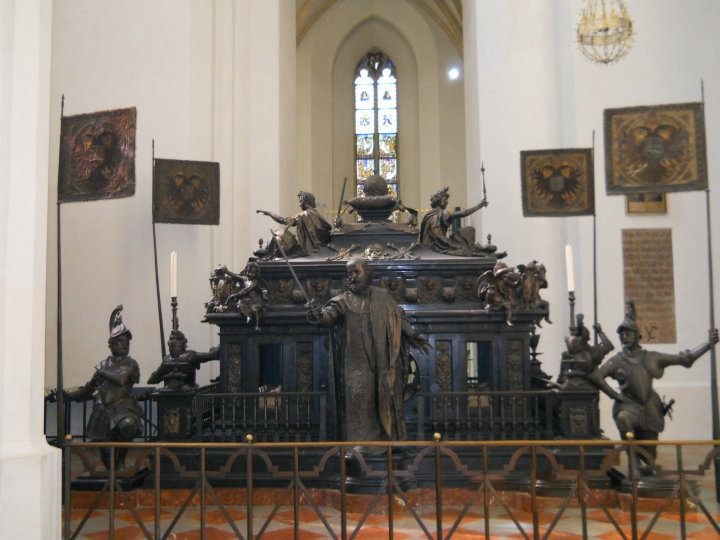
Ludwig IV's tomb, Frauenkirche, Munich

The acquisition of these territories and his restless foreign policy had earned Louis many enemies among the German princes. In the summer of 1346 the Luxembourg Charles IV was elected rival king, with the support of Pope Clement VI. Louis himself obtained much support from the Imperial Free Cities and the knights and successfully resisted Charles, who was widely regarded as a papal puppet ("rex clericorum" as William of Ockham called him). Also the Habsburg dukes stayed loyal to Louis. In the Battle of Crécy Charles' father John of Luxembourg was killed; Charles himself also took part in the battle but escaped.

But then Louis' sudden death avoided a longer civil war. Louis died in October 1347 from a stroke suffered during a bear-hunt in Puch near Fürstenfeldbruck. He is buried in the Frauenkirche in Munich. The sons of Louis supported Günther von Schwarzburg as new rival king to Charles but finally joined the Luxembourg party after Günther's early death in 1349 and divided the Wittelsbach possessions among themselves again. In continuance of the conflict of the House of Wittelsbach with the House of Luxembourg, the Wittelsbach family returned to power in the Holy Roman Empire in 1400 with King Rupert of Germany, a great-grandnephew of Louis.

== Family and children ==
In 1308, Louis married his first wife, Beatrice of Silesia (1290–1322). They had:

1. Mathilda (aft. 21 June 1313 – 2 July 1346, Meißen), married at Nuremberg 1 July 1329 Frederick II, Margrave of Meissen (d. 1349)
2. Daughter (end September 1314 – died shortly after).
3. Louis V, Duke of Bavaria (July 1315 – 17/18 September 1361), duke of Upper Bavaria, margrave of Brandenburg, count of Tyrol
4. Anna (c. July 1317 – 29 January 1319, Kastl)
5. Agnes (c. 1318 – died shortly after).
6. Stephen II (autumn 1319 – 19 May 1375), duke of Lower Bavaria

In 1324, Louis married his second wife, Margaret II, Countess of Hainaut and Holland (1310–1356). They had:

1. Margaret (1325–1374), married:
  1. in 1351 in Ofen Stephen, Duke of Slavonia (d. 1354), son of the King Charles I of Hungary;
  2. 1357/58 Gerlach von Hohenlohe.
2. Anna (c. 1326 – 3 June 1361, Fontenelles) married John I of Lower Bavaria (d. 1340).
3. Louis VI the Roman (7 May 1328 – 17 May 1365), duke of Upper Bavaria, elector of Brandenburg.
4. Elisabeth (1329 – 2 August 1402, Stuttgart), married:
  1. Cangrande II della Scala, Lord of Verona (d. 1359) in Verona on 22 November 1350;
  2. Count Ulrich of Württemberg (died 1388 in the Battle of Döffingen) in 1362.
5. William V of Holland (12 May 1330 – 15 April 1389), as William I duke of Lower Bavaria, as William III count of Hainaut
6. Agnes (Munich, 1335 – 11 November 1352, Munich).
7. Albert I of Holland (25 Jul 1336 – 13 December 1404), duke of Lower Bavaria, count of Hainaut and Holland.
8. Otto V the Bavarian (1340/42 – 15/16 November 1379), duke of Upper Bavaria, Elector of Brandenburg.
9. Louis (October 1347 – 1348).

== See also ==
- Kings of Germany family tree. He was related to every other king of Germany.

== Books ==
- Arblaster, Paul (2018). A History of the Low Countries. Bloomsbury Publishing.
- Blockmans, W.P. (2015). "The Formation of a Political Union". In Blom, J. C. H.; Lamberts, E. (eds.). History of the Low Countries. Translated by Kennedy, James C. Berghahn Books. pp. 55–142.
- Cox, Eugene L. (1967). The Green Count of Savoy. Princeton, New Jersey: Princeton University Press. LCCN 67-11030.
- Thomas, Andrew L. (2010). A House Divided: Wittelsbach Confessional Court Cultures in the Holy Roman Empire, c. 1550–1650. Brill.

Louis the Bavarian House of Wittelsbach Born: 1282 Died: 1347
Regnal titles
Preceded by John I	Duke of Lower Bavaria; 1340–1347	Succeeded by Louis V Stephen II; Louis VI; William I Albert I Otto V
Preceded by Rudolf I	Duke of Upper Bavaria; 1301–1347	Succeeded by Louis V Stephen II; Louis VI; William I Albert I Otto V
Preceded by Rudolf I	Count Palatine of the Rhine; 1319–1329	Succeeded by Rudolf II
Preceded by William the Bold	Count of Hainaut, Holland, and Zeeland; 1345–1347 with Margaret II	Succeeded by Margaret II; William the Mad
Preceded by Henry VII	King of Germany; 1314–1347 with Frederick the Handsome as rival and then co-ruler	Succeeded by Charles IV
Preceded by Henry VII	King of Italy; 1327–1347	Succeeded by Charles IV
Preceded by Henry VII	Holy Roman Emperor; 1328–1347	Succeeded by Charles IV
