= Tassilo I of Bavaria =

Duke of Bavaria
- Reign: 591–610
- Predecessor: Garibald I of Bavaria
- Successor: Garibald II of Bavaria
- Born: c. 560
- Died: 610
- Issue: Garibald II of Bavaria
- House: Agilolfings
- Father: Garibald I of Bavaria
- Mother: Waldrada

Tassilo I (or Tassilon) (c. 560 – 610) was Duke of Bavaria from 591 to his death. According to Paul the Deacon, he was appointed as Bavarian rex by Childebert II, Frankish king of Austrasia, in 591, ending the war with the Franks. The war began during the reign of Tassilo's predecessor, Garibald I, when Garibald concluded a marriage alliance with the Lombards. It is not known whether Garibald died or was deposed, nor is Tassilo's exact relationship to Garibald, though it can be assumed Tassilo was a close relative, if not his son. The fact that Childebert named Tassilo duke shows Frankish control over the Bavarian state.

Paul the Deacon told that Tassilo, shortly after his ascension, moved into the lands of the Slavs (probably the recently conquered eastern Tyrol and Carinthia) and returned victorious with much plunder. This victory proved to be short-lived as Paul tells that two thousand Bavarians were slain to the last man in 595, after the Slavs received help from the Kaghan (chief) of the Avars.

Tassilo died in 610 and was succeeded by his son Garibald II.

== Sources ==
- Störmer, Wilhelm. "Die Baiuwaren: Von der Völkerwanderung bis Tassilo III." pp 64 – 66, Verlag C. H. Beck, 2002, ISBN 3-406-47981-2.
- Paul the Deacon, History of the Lombards: Book 4, Chapter VII

Preceded by Garibald I	Duke of Bavaria; 591–610	Succeeded by Garibald II
