= Garibald II of Bavaria =

Garibald II (585–625) was Duke of Bavaria from 610 until his death. He was the son of Tassilo I, and married Geila (or Gaila), daughter of Gisulf II of Friuli and his wife Romilda.

The successors of Garibald II are not completely known. Bavarian tradition places Theodo I, Theodo II, and Theodo III in the realm of legend, as mythical Agilofing ancestors. The next well-documented Agilofing duke is Theodo V. This, however, leaves a half-century gap between Garibald and his next known successor.

Preceded by Tassilo I	Duke of Bavaria; 610–625	Succeeded by (3 generations later); Theodo of Bavaria
