= Henry XIV of Bavaria =

13th-century Bavarian nobleman

Henry XIV

Duke of Lower Bavaria
- Reign: 1310–1339
- Predecessor: Stephen I
- Successor: John I
- Co-ruler: Otto IV
- Born: 29 September 1305; Landshut
- Died: 1 September 1339 (aged 33)
- Spouse: Margaret of Bohemia
- Issue: John I, Duke of Bavaria; Henry of Wittelsbach
- House: Wittelsbach
- Father: Stephen I, Duke of Bavaria
- Mother: Jutta of Schweidnitz

Henry XIV, Duke of Bavaria (29 September 1305 – 1 September 1339), was Duke of Lower Bavaria (also called Henry II).

== Family ==
Henry was born in Landshut, a son of Stephen I, Duke of Bavaria, and Jutta of Schweidnitz.

His maternal grandparents were Bolko I, Duke of Jawor and Świdnica and Beatrice of Brandenburg.

Bolko was a son of Bolesław II the Bald and his first wife Hedwig of Anhalt. Beatrix was a daughter of Otto V, Margrave of Brandenburg-Salzwedel and Jutta of Hennenberg.

== Biography ==
After the death of his father he became duke of Lower Bavaria together with his brother Otto IV under the tutelage of Louis IV, Holy Roman Emperor. Henry supported Louis against Frederick I and became a candidate for the German crown when Louis considered temporarily his resignation in 1333.

Conflicts with his brother Otto IV (d. 1334) and his cousin Henry XV, Duke of Bavaria on the partition of their lands worsened the relationship between the emperor and Henry XIV, who allied with his father-in-law John I of Bohemia. Notwithstanding this, Henry joined John, with large retinues, to crusade with the Teutonic Order in Prussia in the winter of 1337. Some months after the reconciliation with Louis IV in February 1339 Henry died from leprosy and was succeeded by his son John I, Duke of Bavaria.

== Marriage ==
On 12 August 1328, Henry married Margaret of Bohemia. She was a daughter of John I of Bohemia and Elisabeth of Bohemia (1292–1330). They had two children:

- John I, Duke of Bavaria (29 November 1329 – 20 December 1340)
- Henry of Wittelsbach (1330). Died within the year of his birth.

An illegitimate son named Eberhard is also mentioned in genealogies. Nothing is known of his mother and later life.

== Sources ==
- Boehm, Barbara Drake; Fajt, Jiri, eds. (2005). Prague: The Crown of Bohemia, 1347-1437. Yale University Press.

Henry XIV of Bavaria House of Wittelsbach Born: 1305 Died: 1339
Regnal titles
Preceded by Stephen I	Duke of Lower Bavaria with Otto IV; 1310–1339	Succeeded by John I
