= Otto IV of Lower Bavaria =

Otto IV (January 3, 1307 – December 14, 1334 in Munich) was a Duke of Lower Bavaria.

== Family ==
Otto was a son of Stephen I, Duke of Bavaria and Jutta of Schweidnitz.

His maternal grandparents were Bolko I, Duke of Jawor and Świdnica and Beatrix of Brandenburg.

Bolko was a son of Bolesław II the Bald and his first wife Hedwig of Anhalt. Beatrix was a daughter of Otto V, Margrave of Brandenburg-Salzwedel and Jutta of Hennenberg.

== Reign ==
He succeeded as Duke of Lower Bavaria from 1310 until 1334 as co-regent of his brother Henry XIV and his cousin Henry XV. In 1322 he was in war with his co-regents, in 1331 Lower Bavaria was finally partitioned among them. Otto then governed Burghausen, Traunstein and several other Bavarian cities. Otto, who hated his brother made his cousin Emperor Louis IV, Holy Roman Emperor his contracted heir.

== Marriage ==
Otto IV married Richardis of Jülich. She was a daughter of Gerhard V of Jülich and Elisabeth of Brabant-Aarschot. They had one known child:

- Albert of Wittelsbach. Born in 1332. Predeceased his father.

Otto IV of Lower Bavaria House of Wittelsbach Born: 1307 Died: 1334
German royalty
Regnal titles
Preceded by Stephen I	Duke of Lower Bavaria with Henry XIV; 1310–1334	Succeeded by John I
