= John of Bohemia =

King of Bohemia from 1310 to 1346

John the Blind
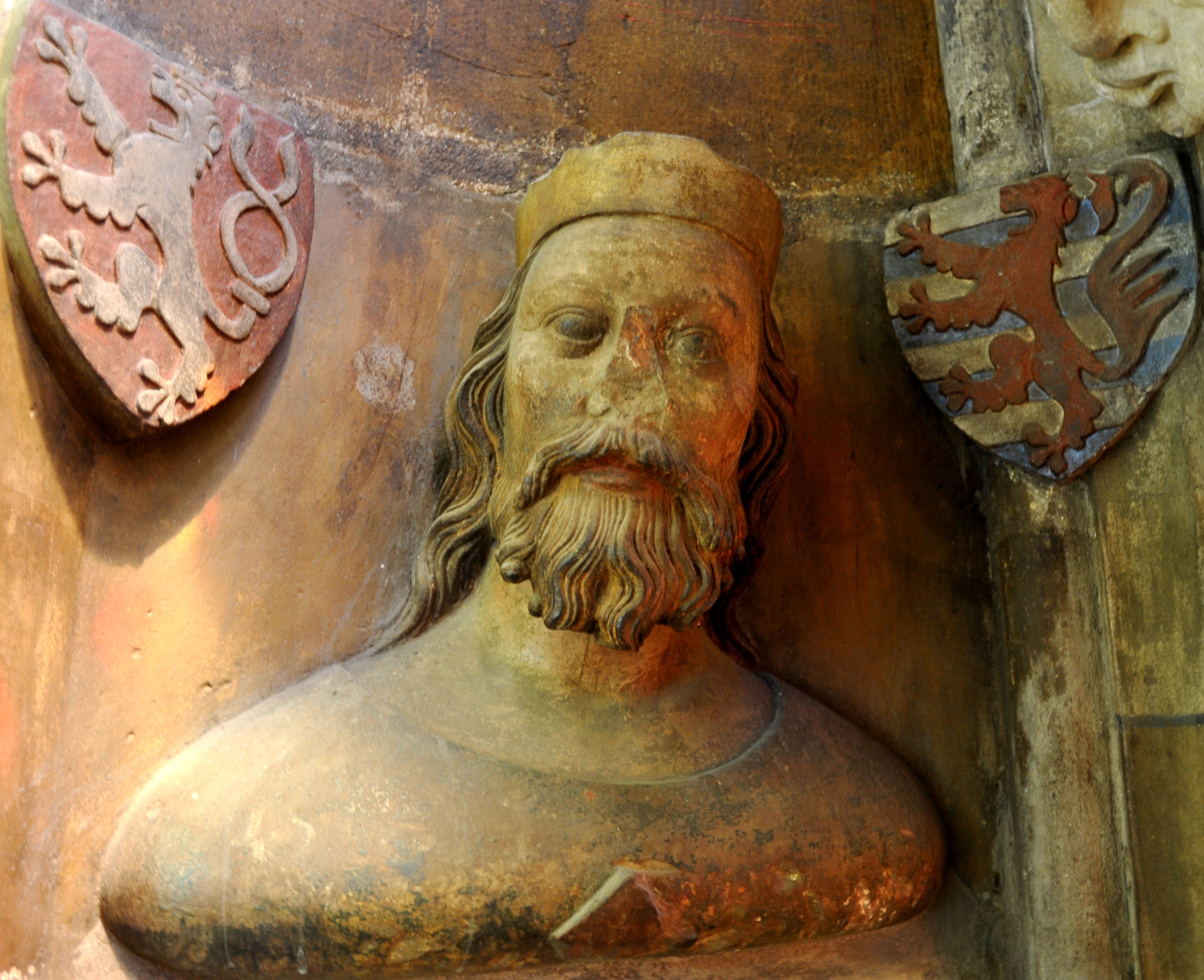
- 14th-century bust of John of Bohemia, St. Vitus Cathedral in Prague with the coats of arms of Bohemia and Luxembourg

King of Bohemia
- Reign: 31 August 1310 – 26 August 1346
- Coronation: 7 February 1311, Prague
- Predecessor: Henry
- Successor: Emperor Charles IV

Count of Luxembourg, Arlon and Durbuy
- Reign: 24 August 1313 – 26 August 1346
- Predecessor: Emperor Henry VII
- Successor: Emperor Charles IV
- Born: 10 August 1296; Luxembourg
- Died: 26 August 1346 (aged 50); Crécy-en-Ponthieu, France
- Burial: Altmünster Abbey, Luxembourg
- Spouses: Elizabeth of Bohemia (m. 1310; died 1330) Beatrice of Bourbon (m. 1334)
- Issue: Margaret, Duchess of Bavaria; Bonne, Duchess of Normandy; Charles IV, Holy Roman Emperor; John Henry, Margrave of Moravia; Anna, Duchess of Austria; Wenceslaus I, Duke of Luxembourg and Brabant; Nicolaus, Patriarch of Aquileia (illegitimate)
- House: Luxembourg
- Father: Henry VII, Holy Roman Emperor
- Mother: Margaret of Brabant

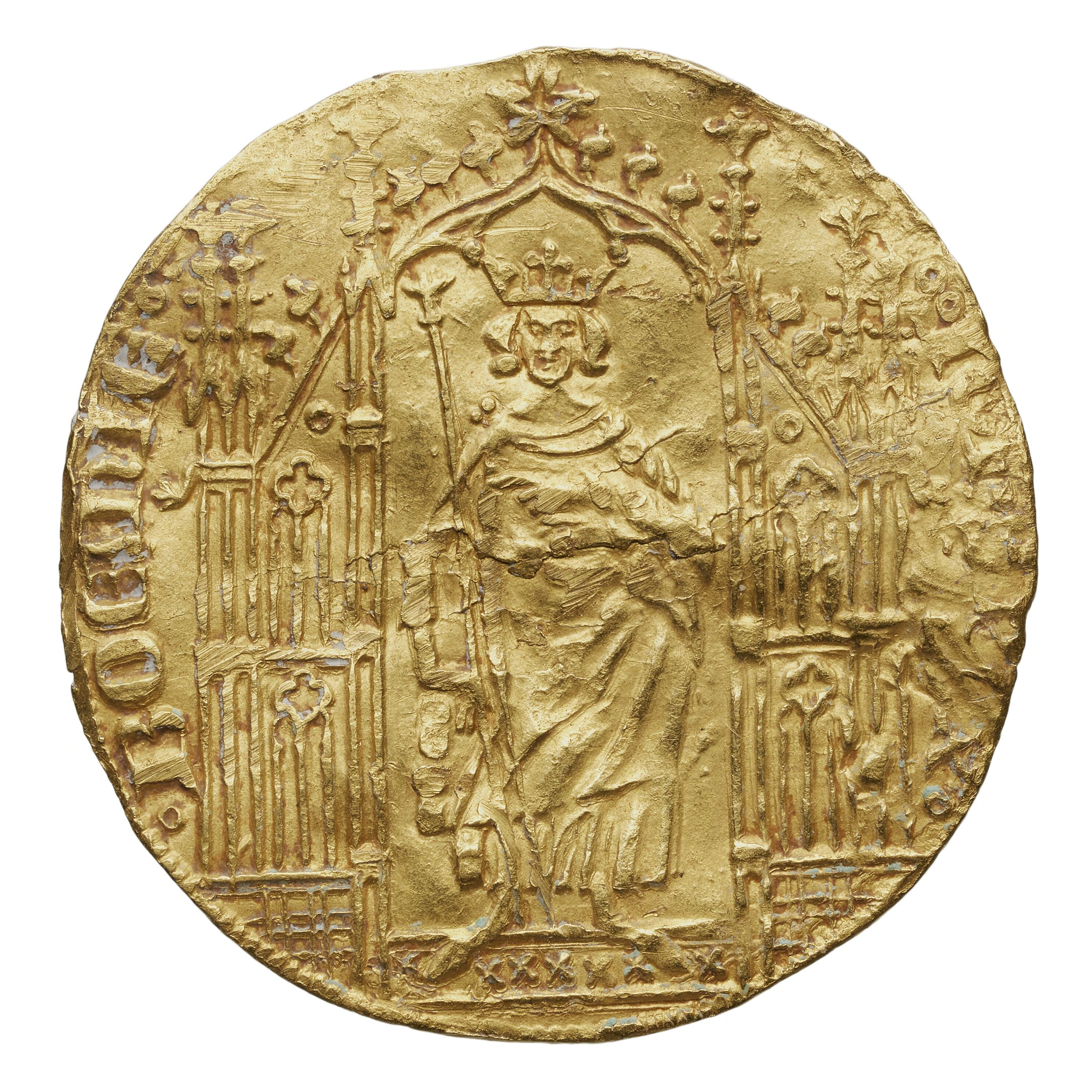
Gold florin coin of John the Blind of Bohemia

John of Luxembourg (Czech: Jan Lucemburský; 10 August 1296 – 26 August 1346), also called John the Blind (Luxembourgish: Jang de Blannen; German: Johann der Blinde), was King of Bohemia and titular King of Poland from 1310, and Count of Luxembourg from 1313. He is well known for having died while fighting in the Battle of Crécy at age 50, after having been blind for a decade. In his home country of Luxembourg, he is considered a national hero. Comparatively, in the Czech Republic (anciently the Kingdom of Bohemia), John is often recognized as the father of Emperor Charles IV.

== Early life ==
John was the eldest son of Henry VII, Holy Roman Emperor, and Margaret of Brabant. Born in Luxembourg and raised in Paris, John was French by education but deeply involved in the politics of Germany.

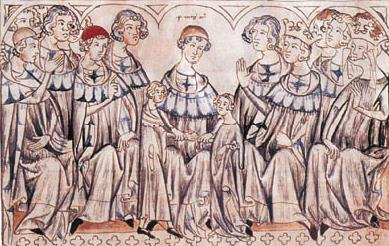
John's wedding to Elisabeth of Bohemia at Speyer

In 1310, his father arranged the marriage of 14-year-old John to Elizabeth of Bohemia. The wedding took place in Speyer, after which the newlyweds made their way to Prague accompanied by a group led by the experienced diplomat and expert on Czech issues, Peter of Aspelt, Archbishop of Mainz. Because the emperor had imperial Czech regiments accompany and protect the couple from Nuremberg to Prague, John was thus forced to invade Bohemia on behalf of his wife Elizabeth. The Czech forces were able to gain control of Prague and depose the reigning king, Henry, on 3 December 1310. The deposed King Henry fled with his wife Anne of Bohemia (the sister of John's wife) to his duchy (the Duchy of Carinthia). The coronation of John and Elizabeth to the Bohemian throne took place on 7 February 1311, making them King and Queen of Bohemia. The castle at Prague was uninhabitable, so John made residence in one of the houses on the Old Town Square, and with the help of his advisors, he stabilized affairs in the Czech state. He thereby became one of the seven prince-electors of the Holy Roman Empire and – in succession of his brother-in-law Wenceslaus III of Bohemia – claimant to the Polish and Hungarian throne. His attempts to follow his father as King of the Romans failed with the election of Louis IV of Bavaria in 1314. Nevertheless, John later would support Louis IV in his rivalry with Frederick the Fair, King of Germany, culminating in the 1322 Battle of Mühldorf in which, in return, he received the Czech region of Egerland as a reward.

== Problems with nobility ==
Like his predecessor Henry, he was disliked by much of the Czech nobility. John was considered an "alien king" and gave up the administration of Bohemia after a while and embarked on a life of travel. He parted ways with his wife and left the Czech country to be ruled by the barons while spending time in Luxembourg and the French court.

John's travels took him to Silesia, Poland, Lithuania, Tyrol, Northern Italy and Papal Avignon. A rival of King Władysław I the Elbow-high to the Polish crown, John supported the Teutonic Knights in the Polish–Teutonic War from 1326 to 1332. He also made several Silesian dukes swear an oath of allegiance to him. In 1335 in Congress of Visegrád, Władysław's successor King Casimir III the Great of Poland paid a significant amount of money in exchange for John's giving up his claim to the Polish throne.

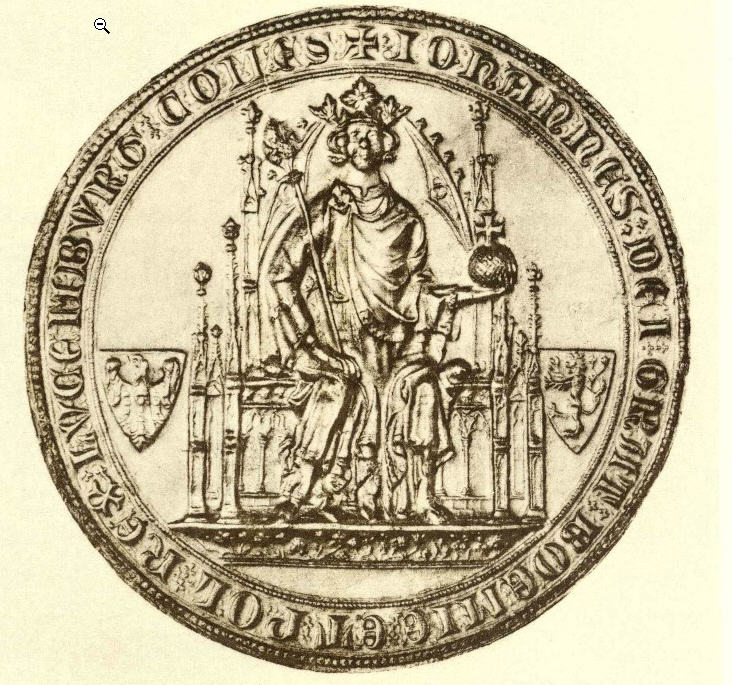
Seal of John of Bohemia. The Latin inscription on the border of the seal reads: iohannes dei grat boemie et pol rex lvcembvrg comes

John's first steps as king were re-establishing authority and securing peace within the country. In 1311, he reached an agreement with the Bohemian and Moravian aristocracy, referred to as the "inaugural diplomas", with which John restricted the relations of both the ruler and aristocracy. The aristocracy was, however, allowed to hold the right to elect the king, to decide the matter of extraordinary taxation, the right to their property, and the right to choose freely whether or not to offer military support to the king in foreign wars. However, the aristocracy was encouraged to raise armies when peace within the country was threatened. On the other hand, the king's right to appoint a foreign official to office was abolished. John structured these agreements to provide a basis for consolidating the ruler's power within the Bohemian kingdom. The agreements weren't as successful as John intended. The aristocracy did not intend to surrender its property and the influence it gained after Wenceslas II died.

The growing tensions within the aristocracy and the lack of communication due to John's consistent absence in Bohemia led to a competition between two factions of the Czech nobility. One party, led by Jindřich of Lipá, gained the trust of John. The other party, led by Vilém Zajíc of Valdek (Latin: Wilhelmus Lepus de Waldek; German: Wilhelm Hase von Waldeck), convinced the Queen that Lord Lipá intended to overthrow John. Consequently, in 1315, John had Jindřich imprisoned.

By 1318, John had reconciled with the nobility and recognised their rights, further establishing dualism of the Estates and a government division between the king and the nobles.

== International politics ==
Foreign politics, rather than Czech, appealed to John, as he was gifted at it. With the help of his father, Henry, John was able to pressure the Habsburgs into reaching an agreement over Moravia. He was also able to pressure the House of Wettin, princes of Saxony, to give over the territory lying to the northern border of the Czech state. John also decided to improve relations with the Silesian principalities close to Bohemia and Moravia in economic and political standings.

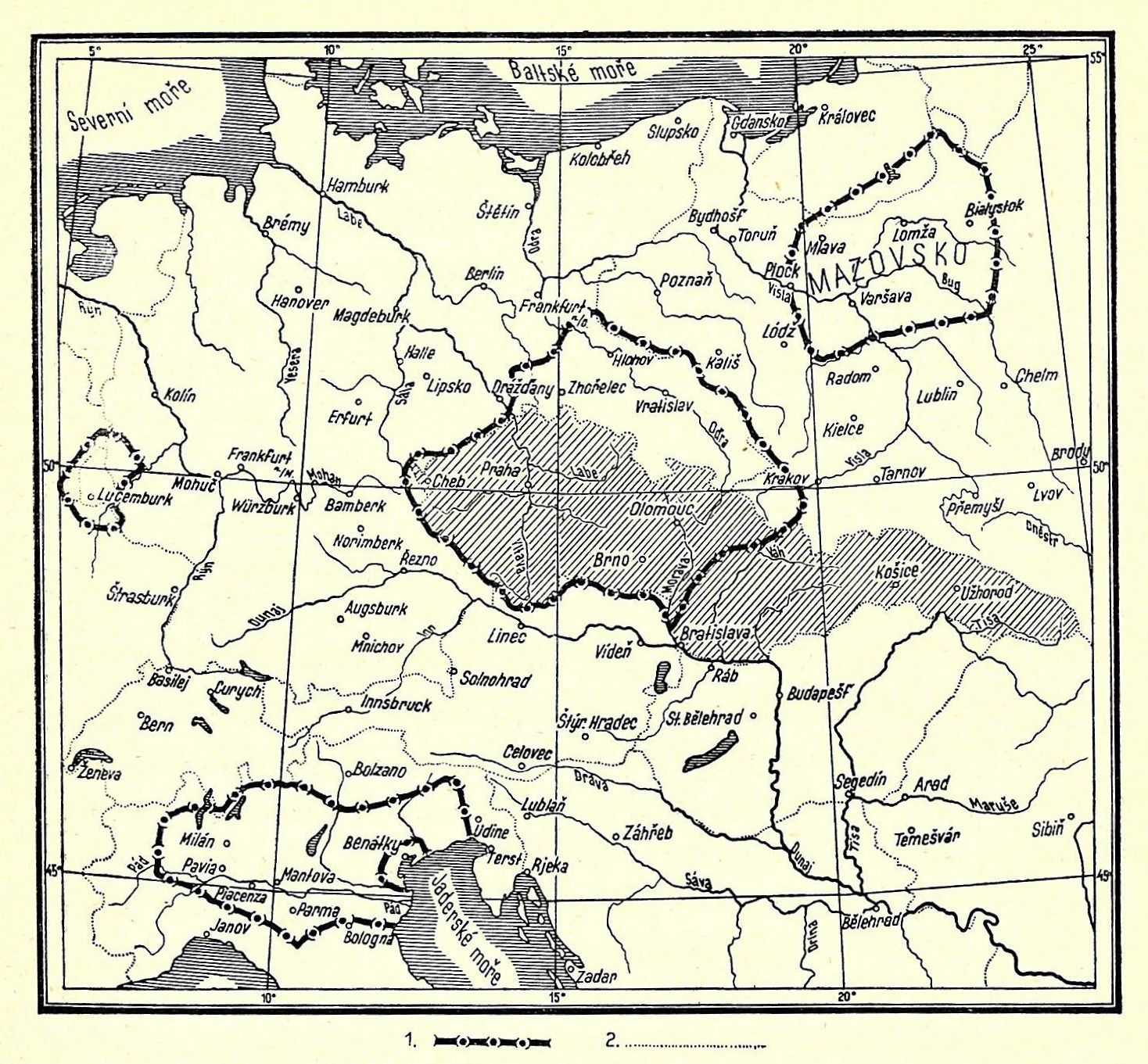
Lands ruled by John of Bohemia (bold borders) compared with the First Czechoslovak Republic (grey).

The international spectrum was further broadened for John when his father named him Imperial Vicar, his deputy for the governance of the Empire. This allowed John to reach further, and he contributed to the imperial coronation along with helping with the conclusion of the Italian territorial wars. In 1313, Henry died suddenly, ending this collaboration between him and John. However, through Henry's death, a spot for the imperial crown opened up, making John a possible candidate, the other two candidates being Fredrick of Habsburg and Louis of Bavaria.

In attempts not to support Fredrick, John voted for Louis at the diet of electors. In return for his support, Louis, as the new emperor, promised the support in territorial claims of the Czech state in Silesia and Meissen as well as the region of Cheb and the Upper Palatinate. Later, in 1319, after the Brandenburg House of Ascania died out, John regained control over the Bautzen region and then the Görlitz region in 1329.

In 1322/23, King John became unsettled by Louis's growing power and allied with France and Austria against him. The dispute would escalate with his son Charles claiming the Imperial crown in opposition to Louis.

== Death ==
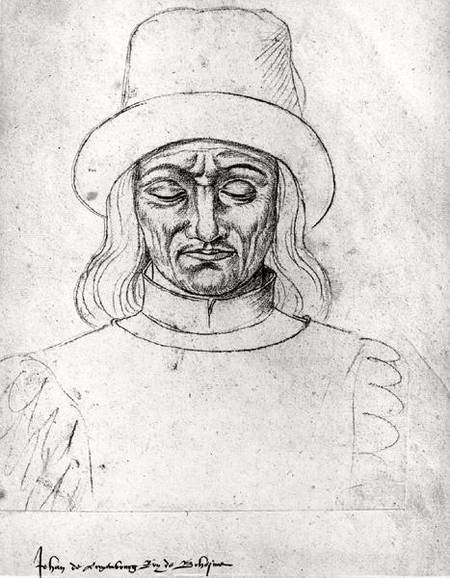
Portrait from the Recueil d'Arras

John lost his eyesight at age 39 or 40 from ophthalmia in 1336, while crusading in Lithuania. A treatment by the famous physician Guy de Chauliac had no positive effects. Following the outbreak of the Hundred Years' War between England and France in 1337, he allied with Philip VI of France and was appointed governor of Languedoc in 30 November 1338, holding the office until November 1340. On 26 August 1346, John fought in the Battle of Crécy against an English army, commanding the French vanguard and overseeing the large contingents of Charles II of Alençon and Louis I, Count of Flanders. John was killed in action at the battle. The medieval French chronicler Jean Froissart left the following account of John's last actions:

...for all that he was nigh blind, when he understood the order of the battle, he said to them about him: 'Where is the lord Charles my son?' His men said: 'Sir, we cannot tell; we think he be fighting.' Then he said: 'Sirs, ye are my men, my companions and friends in this journey: I require you bring me so far forward, that I may strike one stroke with my sword.' They said they would do his commandment, and to the intent that they should not lose him in the press, they tied all their reins of their bridles each to other and set the king before to accomplish his desire, and so they went on their enemies. The lord Charles of Bohemia his son, who wrote himself king of Almaine and bare the arms, he came in good order to the battle; but when he saw that the matter went awry on their party, he departed, I cannot tell you which way. The king his father was so far forward that he strake a stroke with his sword, yea and more than four, and fought valiantly and so did his company; and they adventured themselves so forward, that they were there all slain, and the next day they were found in the place about the king, and all their horses tied each to other.

According to the Cronica ecclesiae Pragensis Benesii Krabice de Weitmile, when told by his aides that the battle was lost and he should flee to save his own life, John replied: "Absit, ut rex Boemie fugeret, sed illuc me ducite, ubi maior strepitus certaminis vigeret, Dominus sit nobiscum, nil timeamus, tantum filium meum diligenter custodite. ("Far be it from you that the king of Bohemia should flee, but lead me there, where the greatest noise of the struggle prevails. The Lord be with us, let us fear nothing, only guard my son diligently.")

John was succeeded as King of Bohemia by his eldest son, Charles. In Luxembourg, he was succeeded by Wenceslaus, his son by his second wife.

== Burial ==
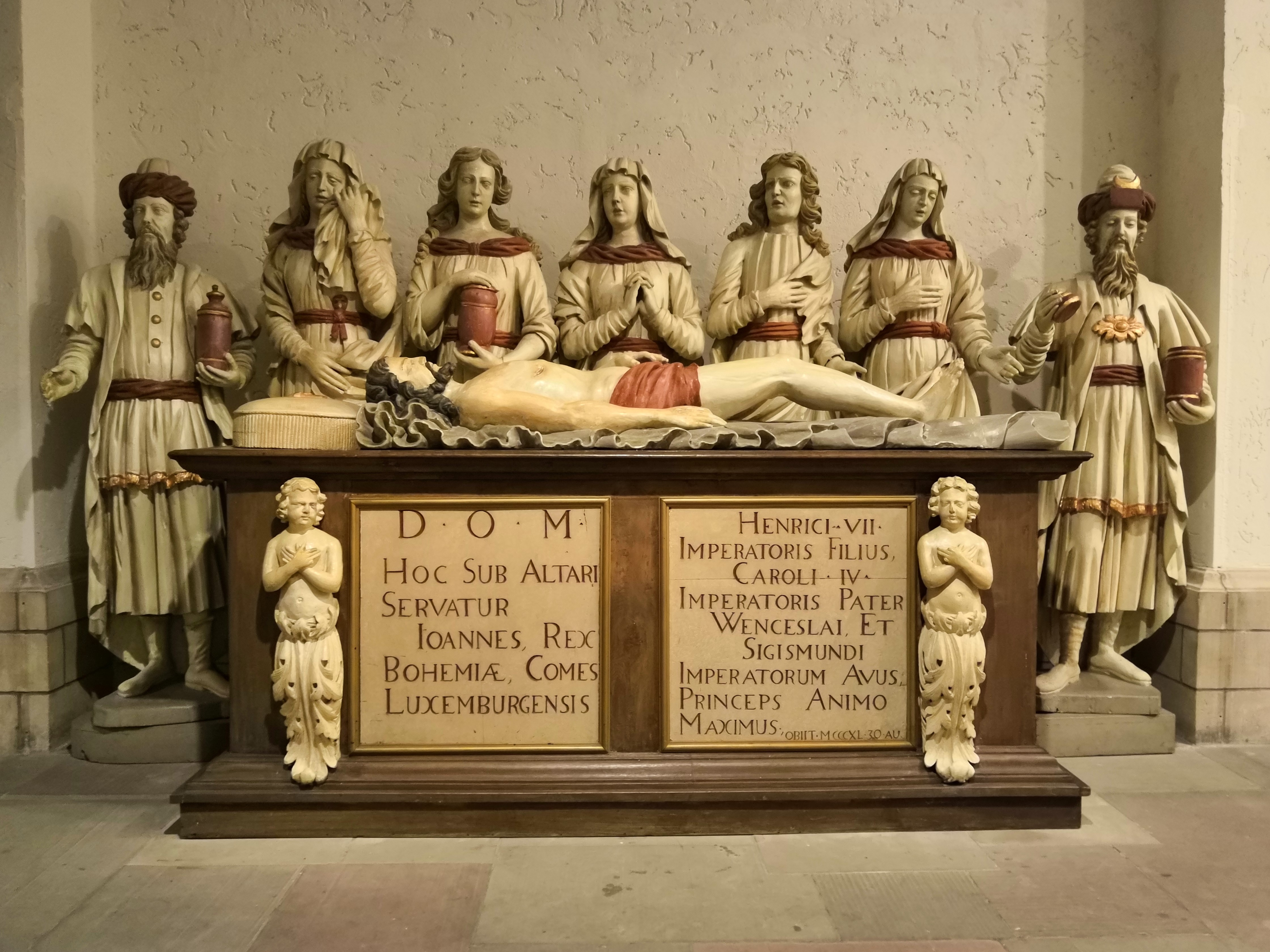
John's tomb in the crypt of the Notre-Dame Cathedral in Luxembourg City

The body of John the Blind was moved to Kloster Altmünster ("Old-Minster Abbey") in Luxembourg. When the abbey was destroyed in 1543, the corpse was moved to Kloster Neumünster ("New-Minster Abbey") in Luxembourg. During the confusion of the French Revolution, the mortal remains were salvaged by the Boch industrialist family (founders of Villeroy & Boch, ennobled in 1892) and hidden in an attic room in Mettlach on the Saar River. The legend is that the abbey monks asked Pierre-Joseph Boch for this favour.

His son Jean-François Boch met with the future King Frederick William IV of Prussia on his voyage through the Rhineland in 1833, offering the remains as a gift. As Frederick William counted John the Blind among his ancestors, he ordered Karl Friedrich Schinkel to construct a funeral chapel. The chapel was built in 1834 and 1835 near Kastel-Staadt on a rock above the town. In 1838, on the anniversary of his death, John the Blind was laid in a black marble sarcophagus in a public ceremony.

In 1945, the Luxembourg government took the chance to obtain possession of the bones. In a cloak and dagger operation, the remains were moved to the crypt of the Notre-Dame Cathedral, Luxembourg. The inscription on the tomb reads: "D.O.M. Hoc Sub Altari Servatur Ioannes, Rex Bohemiæ, Comes Luxemburgensis, Henrici vii Imperatoris Filius, Caroli iv Imperatoris Pater Wenceslai, Et Sigismundi Imperatorum Avus, Princeps Animo Maximus, obiit mcccxl 30 au."

== Family and children ==
Coat of Arms of John the Blind, Count of Luxembourg and King of Bohemia.

John was married twice:

First, to Elisabeth of Bohemia, the daughter of King Wenceslaus II of Bohemia. In this marriage he had the following children:

1. Margaret of Luxembourg, Duchess of Bavaria (8 July 1313 – 11 July 1341, Prague), married in Straubing 12 August 1328 to Henry XIV, Duke of Bavaria
2. Bonne of Luxembourg, Duchess of Normandy (21 May 1315 – 11 September 1349, Maubuisson, born "Judith"), married in Melun 6 August 1332 to John, Duke of Normandy, who later became King John II of France after her death.
3. Charles IV of Luxembourg (14 May 1316 – 29 November 1378), who succeeded him as King of Bohemia and later became Holy Roman Emperor
4. Ottokar ("Otto") (22 November 1318 – 20 April 1320), Prince of Bohemia
5. John Henry of Luxembourg (Jan Jindřich) (12 February 1322, Mělník – 12 November 1375), Margrave of Moravia
6. Anna of Luxembourg, Duchess of Austria (1323 – 3 September 1338), twin of Elizabeth, married 16 February 1335 to Otto, Duke of Austria
7. Elizabeth (1323–1324)

Second (December 1334), to Beatrice of Bourbon, daughter of Louis I, Duke of Bourbon. This marriage produced one son:

1. Wenceslaus I of Luxembourg (25 February 1337 – 7 December 1383), Duke of Luxembourg and later Brabant through his marriage to the heiress Joanna, Duchess of Brabant.

His illegitimate son Nicolaus was Patriarch of Aquileia from 1350 to 1358.

== Sources ==
- Agnew, Hugh L. (2004). The Czechs and the Lands of the Bohemian Crown. Hoover Institution Press.
- Boehm, Barbara Drake; Fajt, Jiri, eds. (2005). Prague: The Crown of Bohemia, 1347-1437. Yale University Press.
- Holladay, Joan A. (2019). Genealogy and the Politics of Representation in the High and Late Middle Ages. Cambridge University Press.
- Lodge, Eleanor Constance (1924). The End of the Middle Age, 1273-1453. Methuen & Company Limited.
- "The Chronicles of Froissart (translated by Lord Berners, edited by G.C. Macaulay). The Harvard Classics". www.bartleby.com. 26 August 2022.
- "CRONICA ECCLESIAE PRAGENSIS BENESSII KRABICE DE WEITMILE". www.clavmon.cz.
- Teich, Mikuláš (1998). Bohemia in History. Cambridge University Press.
- Middleton, John (2015). "Casimir III". World Monarchies and Dynasties. Taylor & Francis.

John of Bohemia House of Luxembourg Born: 10 August 1296 Died: 26 August 1346
Regnal titles
Preceded by Henry	King of Bohemia; 1310–1346	Succeeded by Charles IV & I
Preceded by Henry VII	Count of Luxembourg; 1313–1346	Succeeded by Charles IV & I
