= John I of Bavaria =

German duke (1329-1340)

John I, Duke of Bavaria
- Born: 29 November 1329
- Died: 20 December 1340 (aged 11); Landshut
- Noble family: House of Wittelsbach
- Spouse: Anna of Bavaria
- Father: Henry XIV, Duke of Bavaria
- Mother: Margaret of Bohemia

John I of Bavaria (29 November 1329 – 20 December 1340), was the Duke of Lower Bavaria since 1339.

John I was the son of Henry XIV, Duke of Lower Bavaria, and Margaret of Bohemia. His maternal grandparents were John I of Bohemia and Elisabeth of Bohemia.

He married Anna of Bavaria (1326–3 June 1361), daughter of Louis IV of Bavaria. Still a minor, John I was the last duke of Lower Bavaria for one year only. After his early death in 1340, the duchy of Lower Bavaria passed to Louis IV, who then reunited the duchy of Bavaria in January 1341. His mother Margaret of Bohemia, as a member of the Luxemburg dynasty, then had to return to Bohemia.
