= Agnes of Bavaria (nun) =

Nun and child saint

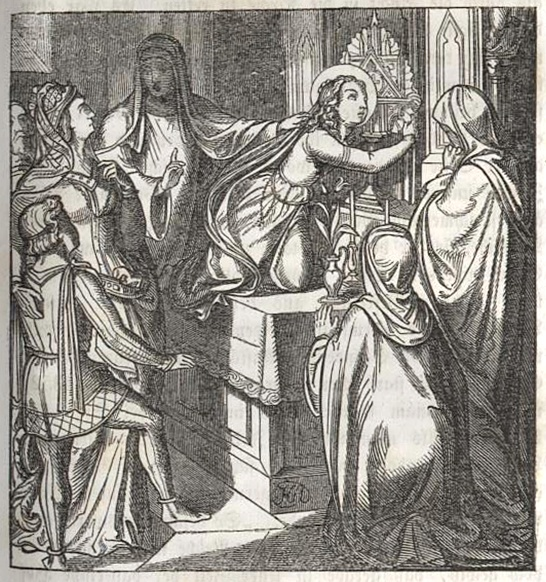
Agnes of Bavaria

Agnes of Bavaria (1335 – 11 November 1352) was a Bavarian nun from Munich and a member of the House of Wittelsbach.

The daughter of Louis IV, Holy Roman Emperor, was brought up in a monastery of Clarissan nuns. She rejected a marriage with a nobleman chosen by her relatives and instead entered a cloister. Always sickly, Agnes died in 1352. The cause for her beatification was opened on 21 February 1705.
