= Margaret of Bohemia, Duchess of Bavaria =

Royal of the House of Luxembourg and Duchess of Lower Bavaria

Margaret of Bohemia

Duchess of Lower Bavaria
- Tenure: 1328–1339
- Coronation: 12 August 1328
- Born: 8 July 1313
- Died: 11 July 1341 (aged 28)
- Burial: Seligenthal Cloister, Landshut, Germany
- Spouse: Henry XIV, Duke of Bavaria
- Issue: John I, Duke of Bavaria; Henry of Wittelsbach
- House: Luxembourg (by birth); Wittelsbach (by marriage)
- Father: John of Luxembourg
- Mother: Elizabeth of Bohemia

Margaret of Bohemia (German: Margarete von Böhmen; 1313–11 July 1341), also Margaret of Luxembourg (Czech: Markéta Lucemburská), was the daughter of John of Luxembourg, King of Bohemia by his first wife, Elizabeth of Bohemia.

== Family ==
Margaret's maternal grandparents were Wenceslaus II of Bohemia and his first wife, Judith of Habsburg. Her paternal grandparents were, Henry VII, Holy Roman Emperor and his wife Margaret of Brabant. Her younger brother was crowned Charles IV, Holy Roman Emperor in 1349, and her other siblings included Bonne of Luxembourg, wife of John II of France; John Henry, Margrave of Moravia; and Anne of Bohemia, Duchess of Austria, wife of Otto, Duke of Austria.

When Margaret was about seventeen, her mother died. When her father decided to remarry, he married Beatrice of Bourbon. They had a son, Wenceslaus I, Duke of Luxembourg, who succeeded his father in Luxembourg.

== Marriage ==
She married Henry XIV, Duke of Bavaria in Straubing on 12 August 1328.

Her children with Henry XIV of Bavaria were:

- John I, Duke of Bavaria (1329–1340)
- Henry of Wittelsbach (born 1330, died young).

Henry XIV had conflicts with his co-regnants of Bavaria – his brother, Otto IV, Duke of Lower Bavaria (died 1334), and his cousin, Henry XV, Duke of Bavaria – regarding the partitioning of the Bavarian lands. This worsened the relationship between the emperor and Henry XIV, who allied with Margaret's father, John.

== Widowhood ==
Some months after the reconciliation with Louis IV, in February 1339, Henry died from leprosy. He was succeeded by his ten year old son, John I. With the death of Duke John I in 1340, Louis IV, Holy Roman Emperor inherited Lower Bavaria and then reunited the duchy of Bavaria.

Margaret of Bohemia, as a member of the Luxemburg dynasty, was then driven by Louis from Bavaria. Her brother Charles forged plans to marry Margaret to Casimir III the Great, King of Poland, but she refused the match as she was "overcome with grief" after the deaths of her husband and son. She died in 1341, before the marriage was supposed to take place.

== Ancestors ==
Ancestors of Margaret of Bohemia, Duchess of Bavaria

16. Henry V, Count of Luxembourg
8. Henry VI, Count of Luxembourg
17. Margaret of Bar
4. Henry VII, Holy Roman Emperor
18. Baudoin d'Avesnes
9. Beatrice d'Avesnes
19. Felicitas de Coucy
2. John I of Bohemia
20. Henry III, Duke of Brabant
10. John I, Duke of Brabant
21. Adelaide of Burgundy
5. Margaret of Brabant
22. Guy of Dampierre
11. Margaret of Flanders
23. Matilda de Bethune
1. Margaret of Bohemia
24. Wenceslaus I of Bohemia
12. Ottokar II of Bohemia
25. Kunigunde of Hohenstaufen
6. Wenceslaus II of Bohemia
26. Rostislav Mikhailovich
13. Kunigunda of Slavonia
27. Anna of Hungary
3. Elizabeth of Bohemia
28. Albert IV, Count of Habsburg
14. Rudolf I of Germany
29. Heilwig of Kiburg
7. Judith of Habsburg
30. Burchard III of Hohenberg
15. Gertrude of Hohenberg
31. Mechtild of Tübingen

Preceded by Richardis of Jülich	Duchess of Lower Bavaria; 1328–1339	Succeeded by Margaret, Countess of Tyrol (United Bavaria)
