= Stephen I of Bavaria =

Duke of Lower Bavaria

Stephen I (March 14, 1271 – December 10, 1310) was the duke of Lower Bavaria from 1290 until 1310 as co-regnant of his older brothers Otto III († 1312) and Louis III († 1296).

== Biography ==
Stephen was born in Landshut, the son of Henry XIII, Duke of Bavaria and Elizabeth of Hungary. His maternal grandparents were Béla IV of Hungary and Maria Laskarina.

His mother introduced the name Stephen onto the Wittelsbach dynasty with her youngest son. She was a sister of Stephen V of Hungary, and may have named her son after him.

To reduce the influence of the Wittelsbach, Pope Nicholas IV refused his spiritual career in Salzburg and Stephen became a co-regnant of his brothers. During the absence of Otto III in Hungary 1305-1308, Stephen was the only governing duke of Lower Bavaria. Stephen was an enemy of the Habsburgs and died in 1310 during a war against Frederick I of Austria.

== Marriage and children ==
In 1299, Stephen married Jutta of Schweidnitz. She was a daughter of Bolko I, Duke of Jawor and Świdnica and Beatrix of Brandenburg. Her maternal grandparents were Otto V, Margrave of Brandenburg-Salzwedel and Jutta of Hennenberg. They had eight children:

- Agnes of Wittelsbach (1301 - 7 December 1316). Joined the Cistercian Monastery at Seligenthal as a nun.
- Beatrix of Wittelsbach (1302 - 29 April 1360). Married Henry III of Gorizia. Regent for their son John Henry IV of Gorizia.
- Friedrich of Wittelsbach (c. 1303). Considered to have died young.
- Judith of Wittelsbach (c. 1304). Considered to have died young.
- Henry XIV, Duke of Bavaria (29 September 1305 - 1 September 1339).
- Elizabeth of Wittelsbach (1306 - 25 March 1330). Married Otto, Duke of Austria.
- Otto IV, Duke of Lower Bavaria (3 January 1307 - 14 December 1334).
- Ludwig of Wittelsbach (c. 1308). Considered to have died young.

== Sources ==
- Kersken, Norbert (2021). "Poland and the Polish People in Late Medieval German Historiography". In Pleszczynski, Andrzej; Vercamer, Grischa (eds.). Germans and Poles in the Middle Ages. Brill.

Stephen I of Bavaria House of Wittelsbach Born: 1271 Died: 1310
German royalty
Regnal titles
Preceded by Henry XIII	Duke of Lower Bavaria; 1290–1310	Succeeded by Henry XIV with Otto IV
