= Gaubald =

Gaubald (c. 700 – 23 December 761) was the first bishop of Regensburg after the foundation of the diocese of Regensburg (he had been preceded by several of episcopi vagantes active in the region). He has been beatified. His name is also spelled Gawibald, Geupald, or Gaibald.

== Life ==
He was ordained bishop in Regensburg in 739 by Saint Boniface. Gaubald was also abbot-bishop or mitered abbot of St. Emmeram's Abbey. In 740 he moved the bones of the late Emmeram of Regensburg to the crypt in the later Benedictine abbey. On his death, Gaubald was buried in the Ramwoldkrypta in the Abbey.

== Sources ==
- (in German) Albert Lehner: Sacerdos = Bischof. Klerikale Hierarchie in der Emmeramsvita. Leipzig 2007.
- Ekkart Sauser (2000). "Gaubald". In Bautz, Traugott (ed.). Biographisch-Bibliographisches Kirchenlexikon (BBKL) (in German). Vol. 17. Herzberg: Bautz. col. 444. ISBN 3-88309-080-8.
