= Public Observatory Regensburg =

Observatory in Regensburg, Germany

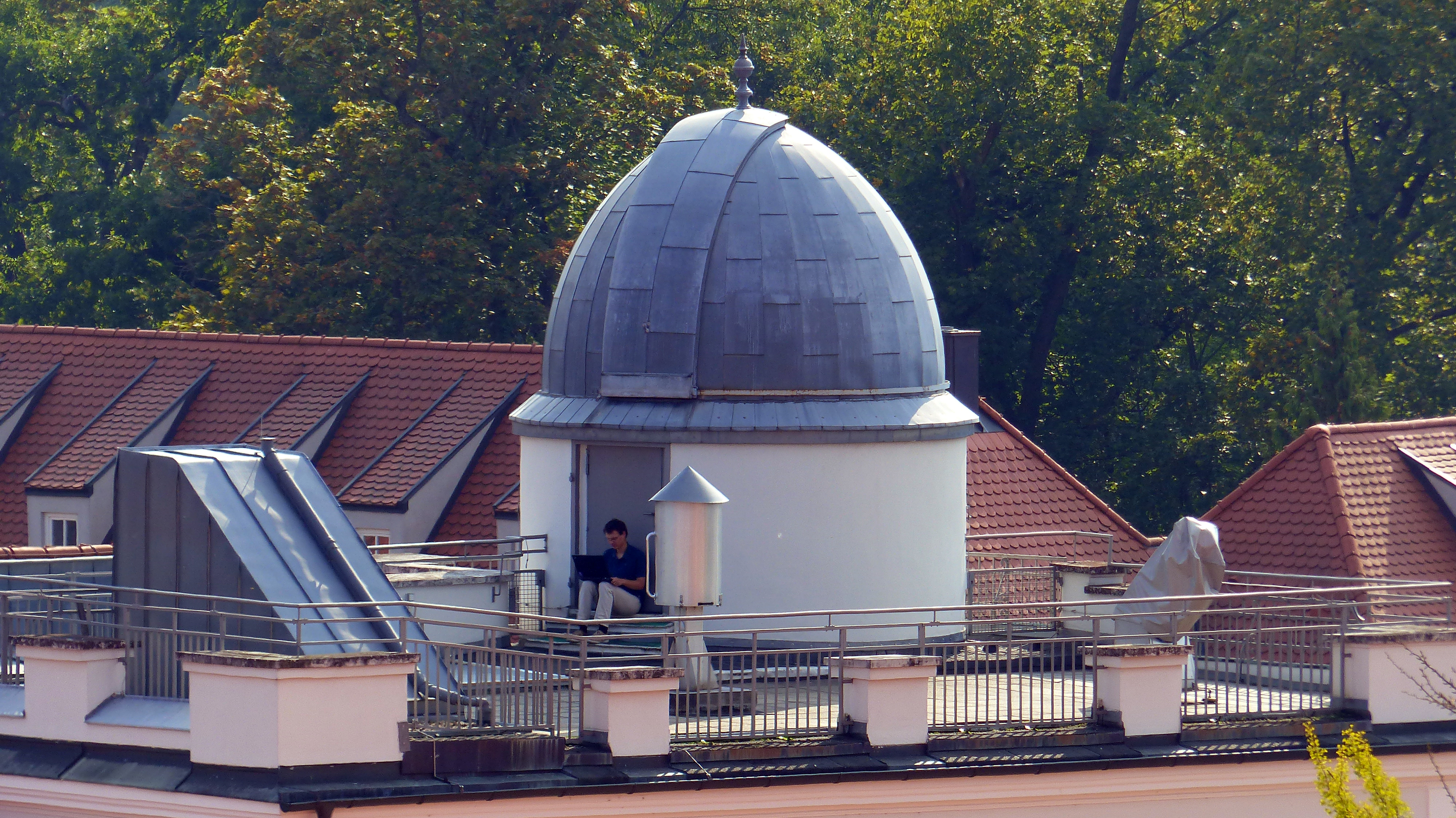
- Location: Regensburg, Upper Palatinate, Bavaria, Germany
- Coordinates: 49°01′03″N 12°05′26″E
- Website: sternwarte-regensburg.de
- Location of Public Observatory Regensburg
- Related media on Commons

The Public Observatory Regensburg (German: Volkssternwarte Regensburg) is an astronomical observatory located in Regensburg, Germany. Its history dates back to the year 1774 when Saint Emmeram's Abbey dedicated two towers to astronomical observations. For the most time, it served for educational purposes. Today it is run by a non-profit organization, the Verein der Freunde der Sternwarte Regensburg e.V.. The observatory is accessible for visitors on Friday evenings.

== History ==
=== 1774 to 1902 ===
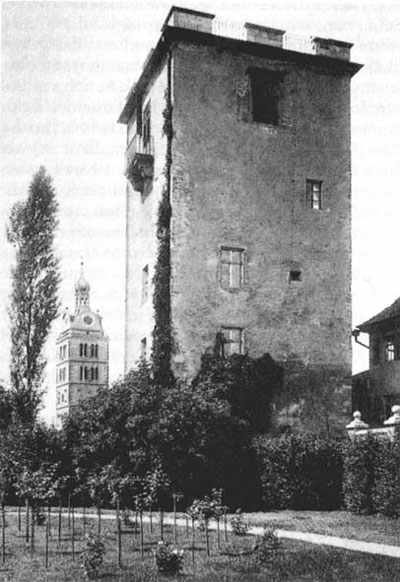
Placidustower

The precursor of the currently existing observatory was founded in 1774 at the Saint Emmeram's Abbey. Prince-Abbot Frobenius Forster dedicated two towers of the abbey which were prepared for astronomical and meteorological observations in the years 1774 and 1775. When the abbey was dissolved in 1812, the observatory was moved into a tower in the city wall. This tower was named Placidustower after Placidus Heinrich, one of its first users and a monk of the Order of Saint Benedict. Placidus Heinrich introduced astronomy as a subject at the Lyzeum in Regensburg, a university dedicated to Philosophy and Theology. The remaining instruments are now part of the historical collection at the University of Regensburg.

=== 1902 to 1968 ===
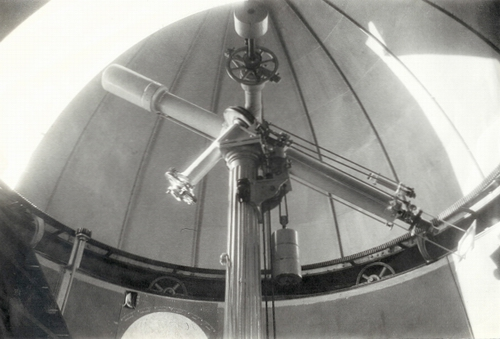
Dome with refracting telescope made by Reinfelder.

Due to the construction of a new road, the Placidustower was torn down in 1902. The government of Bavaria assigned 20,000 Mark to build a new observatory. Two new floors and a dome on top of the roof were constructed on top of an existing building used by the Lyzeum. The dome was produced by Heyde, a company located in Dresden. The construction was started in 1902 and finished in 1905. The dome received a refracting telescope build by Reinfelder.

In the year 1919 physicist Professor Karl Stoeckl was appointed to the Lyzeum in Regensburg. In November 1919, a local newspaper announced a public talk about the Milky Way for the first Thursday in the new year. Since then Karl Stoeckl regularly opened the observatory to the public. In 1923 the Lyzeum was converted to a Philosophisch-theologische Hochschule (German for philosophical-theological college). A local newspaper reported in 1938 that the observatory is opened to the public on Friday evenings.

=== Since 1968 ===
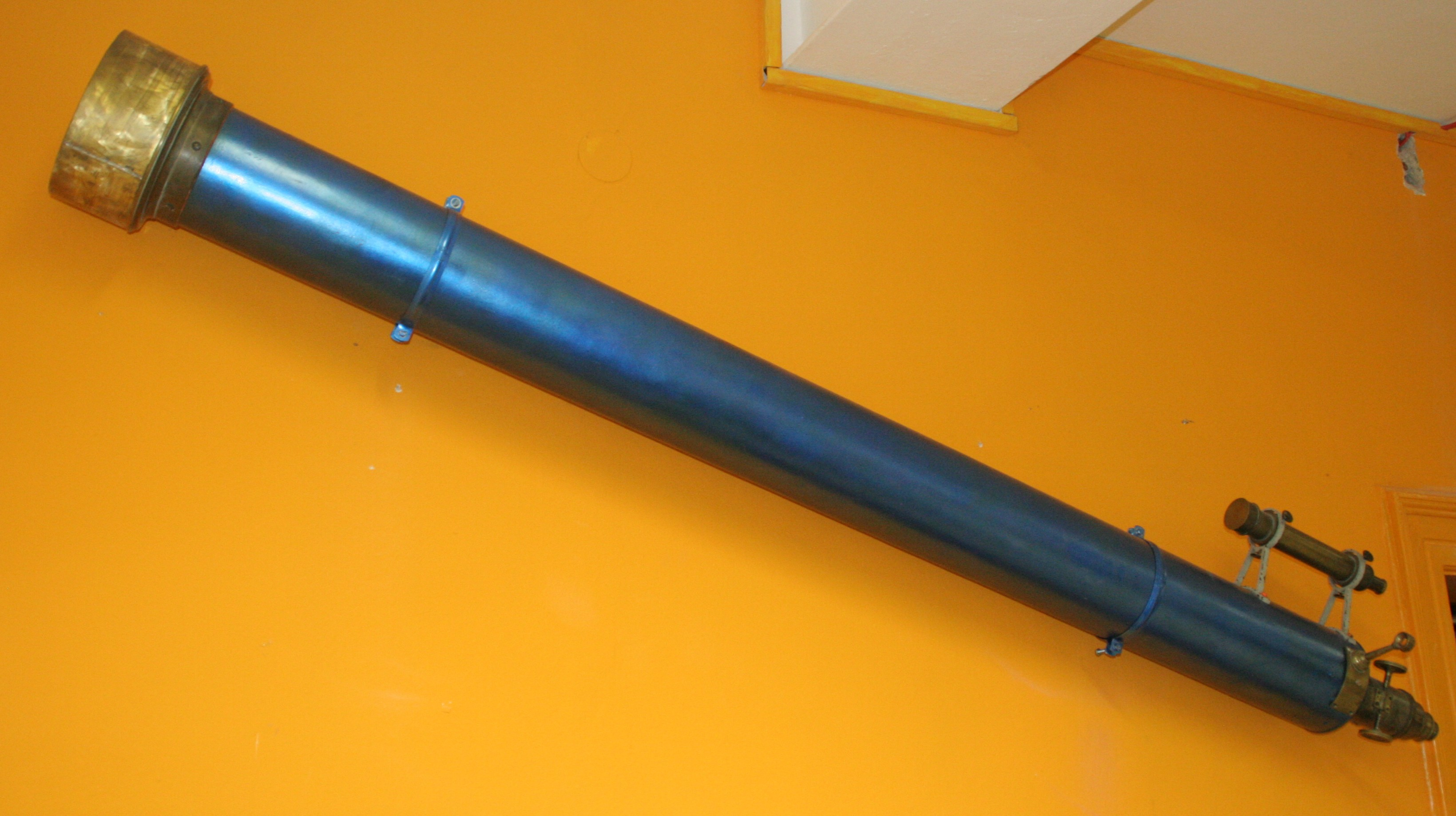
Damaged 6" refracting telescope displayed in the lecture hall.

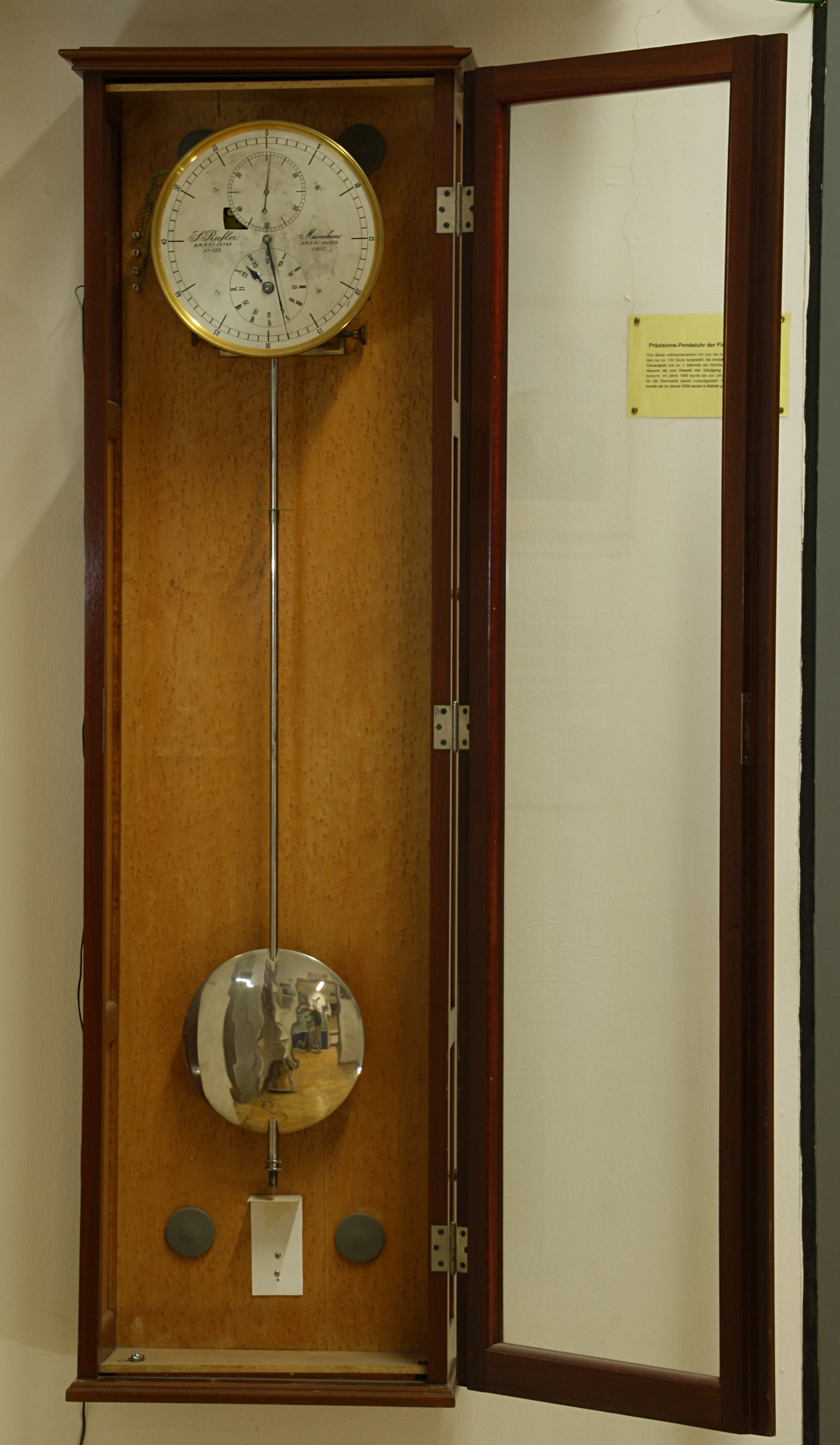
Precision clock build by Riefler in 1905.

After the closure of the Philosophisch-theologische Hochschule in the year 1968, the observatory was sustained as a part of the Regensburg University of Applied Sciences through the efforts made by Prof. Dr. Bernhard Heß and Alois Menath.

In 1976 a non-profit club, the Verein der Freunde der Sternwarte Regensburg e.V., was founded and is running the observatory until today. In 1982 the observatory was renovated. During the renovation, the telescope from 1905 was permanently damaged and replaced by an apochromat build by Lichtenknecker.

== The Observatory Today ==
Today, the dome houses a 6" apochromat and a 12.5" Cassegrain telescope. Other telescopes available at the observatory include an 11" and a 12" Schmidt–Cassegrain telescope. The inventory of the observatory includes a high precission clock build by Riefler. The rooms of the two floors dedicated to the observatory house 3 exhibition rooms and a lecture hall.

== See also ==
- List of astronomical observatories

== Bibliography ==
- Alois Menath, 1969: "Zur Geschichte der Regensburger Sternwarte" in Acta Albertina Ratisbonensia Band. 29
- Mitteilungen zur Astronomiegeschichte Nr. 3 (PDF; 12 kB) Alois Menath, 1993: "Beobachtungsinstrumente der alten Regensburger Lyzeumssternwarte (1812 bis 1902)"
- Sandra Wilde, 1999. "... denn ohne Observatorium giebt es keine Observationen": Astronomen und Sternwarten in Regensburg, 1773–1923.
- Benjamin Mirwald, 2014: Volkssternwarten: Verbreitung und Institutionalisierung populärer Astronomie in Deutschland 1888–1935. AVA (Akademische Verlagsanstalt)
- Wilhelm Schenz, 1930: Das erste Jahrhundert des Lyzeum Albertinum Regensburg (1810–1910)
- Bernhard Heß, 1980; Die Naturwissenschaften an der Philosophisch-Theologischen Hochschule Regensburg im 19. und 20. Jahrhundert
- Christoph Meinel, 2017: Wissensdinge. Die historische Instrumentensammlung; in 50 Jahre Universität Regensburg; pages 356–359
- Andreas Becker, 2015: Die Schriftgutverwaltung des Lyzeum Albertinum und der Philosophisch-Theologischen Hochschule im Spiegel der Überlieferung im Universitätsarchiv Regensburg, in VHVO 154
