= Arnold of Saint Emmeram =

German Benedictine scholar and writer

Arnold of Saint Emmeram (Latin: Arnoldus Emmeramensis, Arnoldus de Sancto Emmeramo) was an early 11th century Benedictine scholar, writer, composer and prior at Saint Emmeram's Abbey. He was of noble birth, from the house of Vohburg. In his youth he was an avid reader of the Roman classics, but he turned away from them for fear of being infected by their paganism. His literary taste was still lastingly influenced, and he felt the medieval Latin of the Vita St Emmerami was insufficient, proposing a revision in better Latin. This plan however met with resistance on the part of the monks of the abbey, and Arnoldus was even forced to flee, moving to Magdeburg, where Meginfrid, rector of the local Latin school, took up the project of revising the text of the legend. Arnoldus himself is the author of two books, De miraculis et memoria cultorum Sancti Emmerami and a work on Saint Emmeram in dialogue form.

Arnold's year of death is unknown, but later than 1035, likely close to 1050.
