= Aurelia of Regensburg =

Roman Catholic Austrian saint

Saint Aurelia of Regensburg
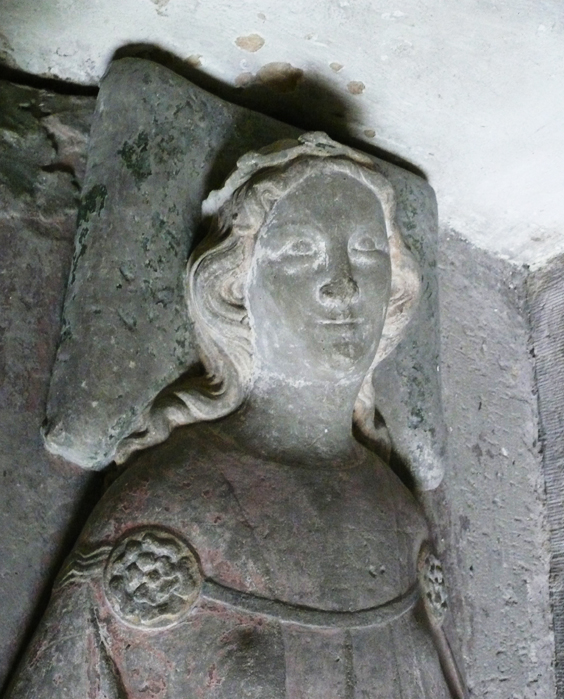

Virgin
- Died: 1027
- Venerated in: Eastern Orthodox Church, Roman Catholic Church
- Feast: October 15
- Patronage: invoked against fevers

Saint Aurelia of Regensburg (died 1027), also known as Aurelia of Ratisbon, is an 11th-century Roman Catholic German saint.

== Life ==
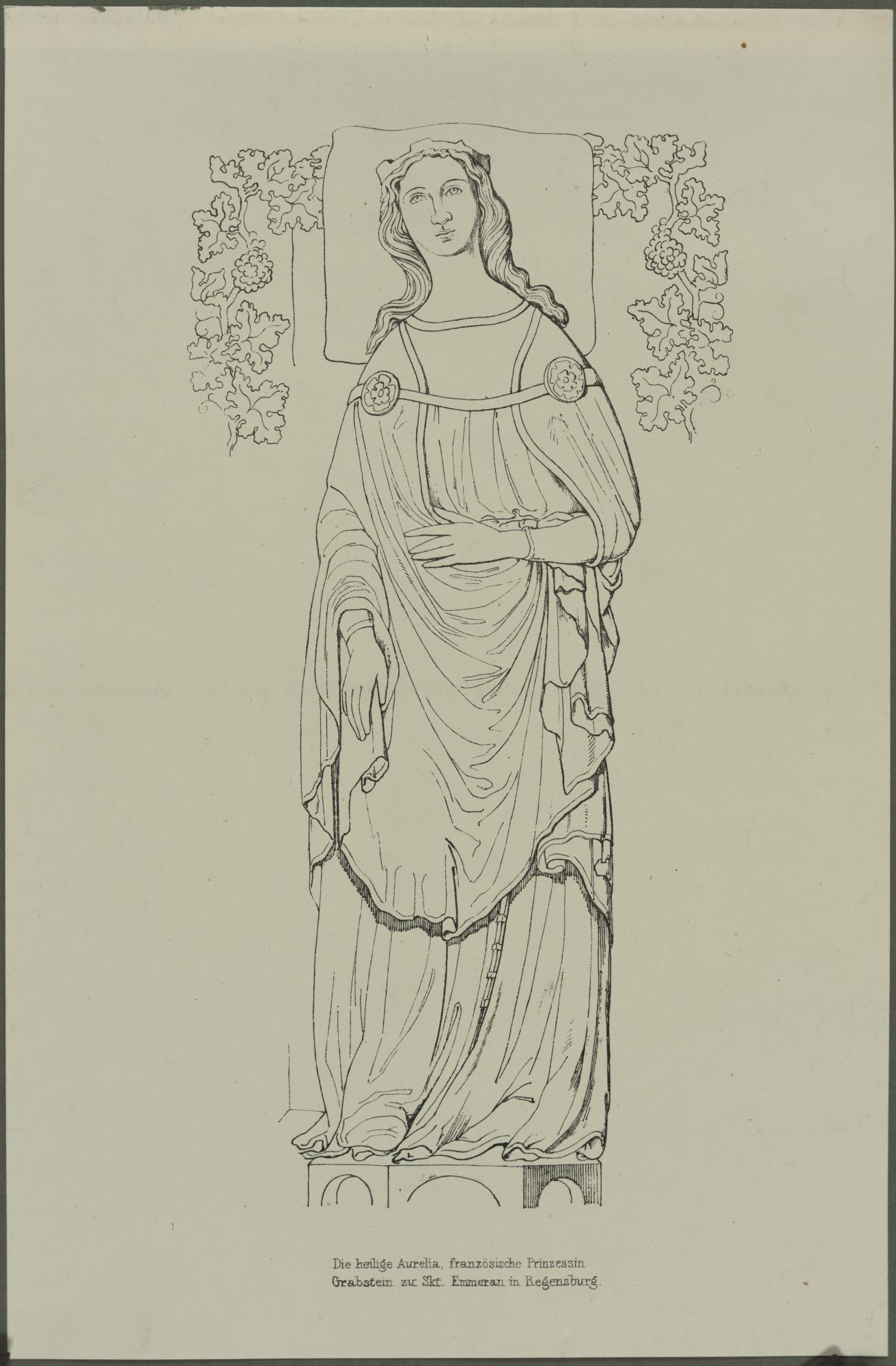
Drawing of Aurelia from the gravestone of Emmeram of Regensburg

According to local tradition, Aurelia was a daughter of Hugh Capet, the first King of the Franks. She fled, disguised as a pilgrim, in order to escape a marriage arranged by her parents against her will. Following the advice of Saint Wolfgang, Bishop of Ratisbon, who saw through her disguise, she accepted the life of a solitary and entered St. Emmeram's Abbey near Regensburg, where she remained for about fifty-two years.

The reputation of her sanctity, evidenced by several miracles, was widespread at the time of her death in 1027. Her relics were enshrined, and her hermitage converted into a chapel, which became a popular pilgrimage site.

Aurelia's name comes from the Latin term aureus meaning "golden".
