= Sacramentary of Henry II =

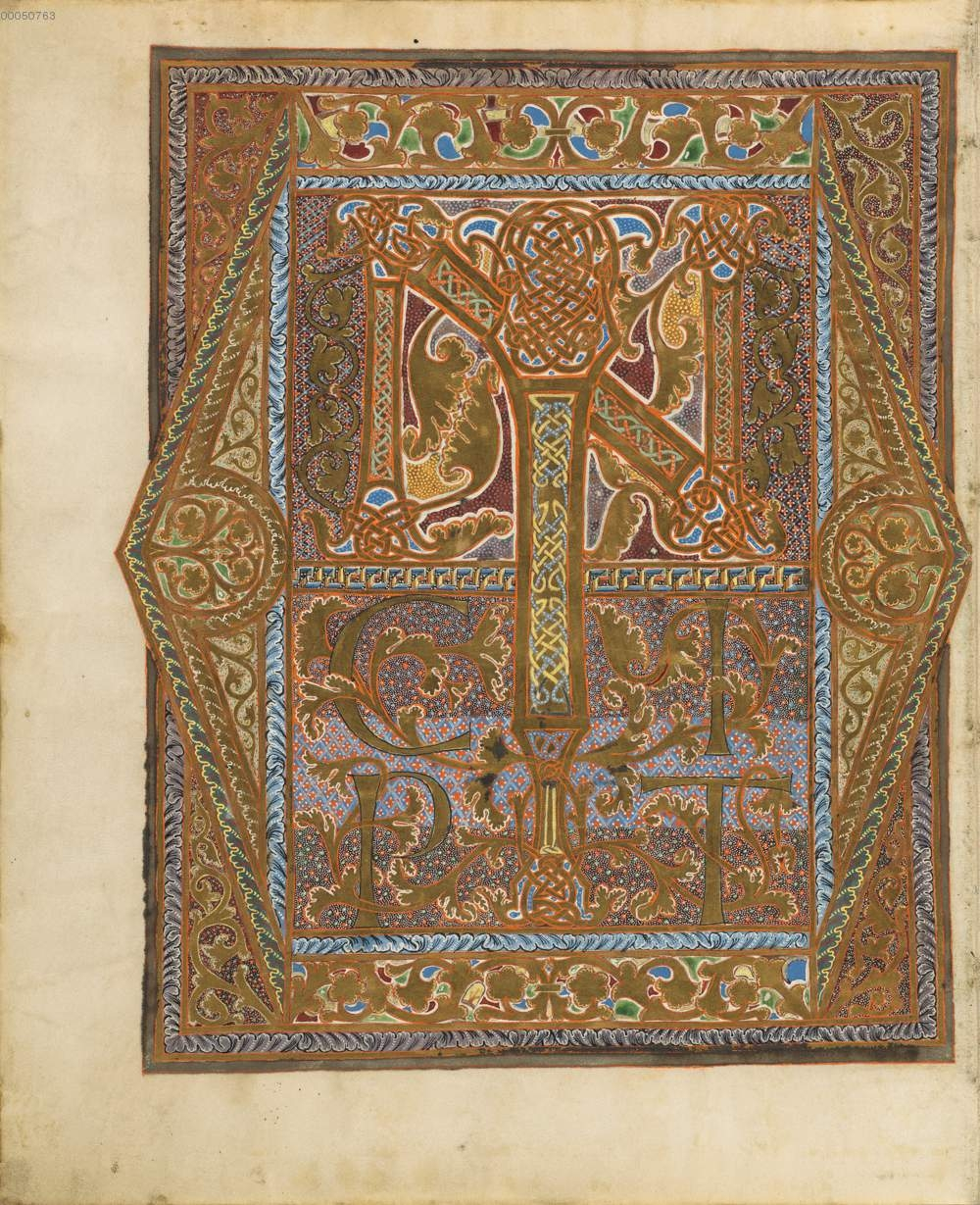
Initial page fol. 12v: Incipit

The Sacramentary of Henry II (German: Sakramentar Heinrichs II.), also called the Regensburg Sacramentary (Regensburger Sakramentar), is a manuscript of liturgical texts, which was created in Regensburg at the order of Emperor Henry II (r. 995–1024). It is among the most significant works of Ottonian illumination. The manuscript was gifted to Bamberg Cathedral by Henry II, was part of the Cathedral treasury until 1803 when it became part of the Bavarian State Library as a result of Secularisation. It remains there today, stored under the inventory number clm 4456. It is modelled on the Codex Aureus of St. Emmeram donated by Charles the Bald in 870.

== Description ==
=== Manuscript ===
==== Contents and layout ====
The sacramentary is made up of 358 leaves measuring 298 x 241 mm and contains the Canon of the Mass, the Preface, and the Collects.

The manuscript begins with a lavishly arranged, richly decorated illuminated page, which serves as the title page for a twelve-page liturgical calendar with the list of feast days of the liturgical year inscribed in gold. This is followed by the first figural image: the coronation of Henry. It is followed by a well-known image of Henry enthroned, which is modelled on the depiction of Charles the Bald in the Codex Aureus of St Emmeram, and a miniature of Gregory the Great.

==== Coronation image ====
===== Iconography =====
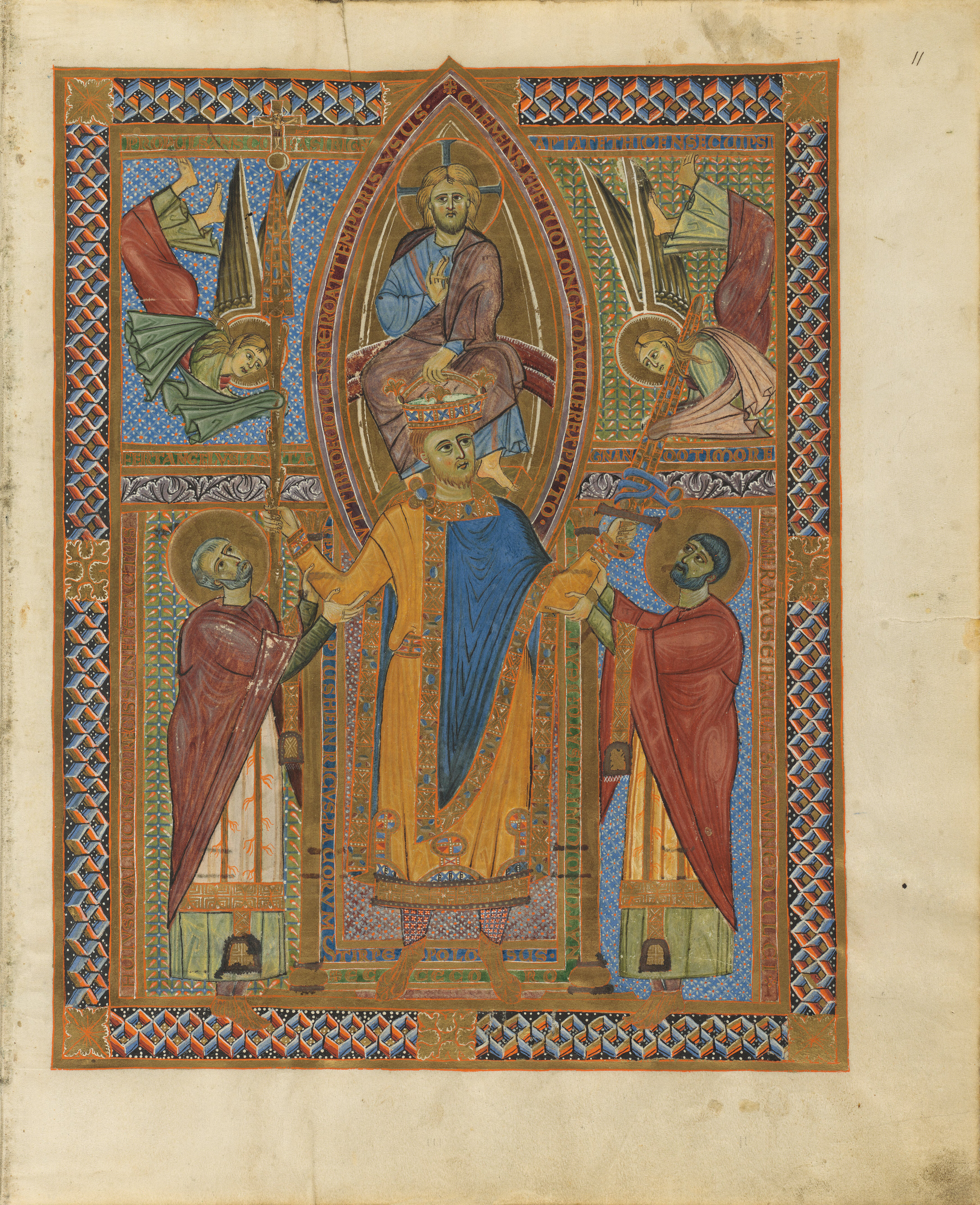
Illumination showing Henry II being crowned by Christ, with Saint Emmeram and Saint Ulrich on either side (fol. 11r)

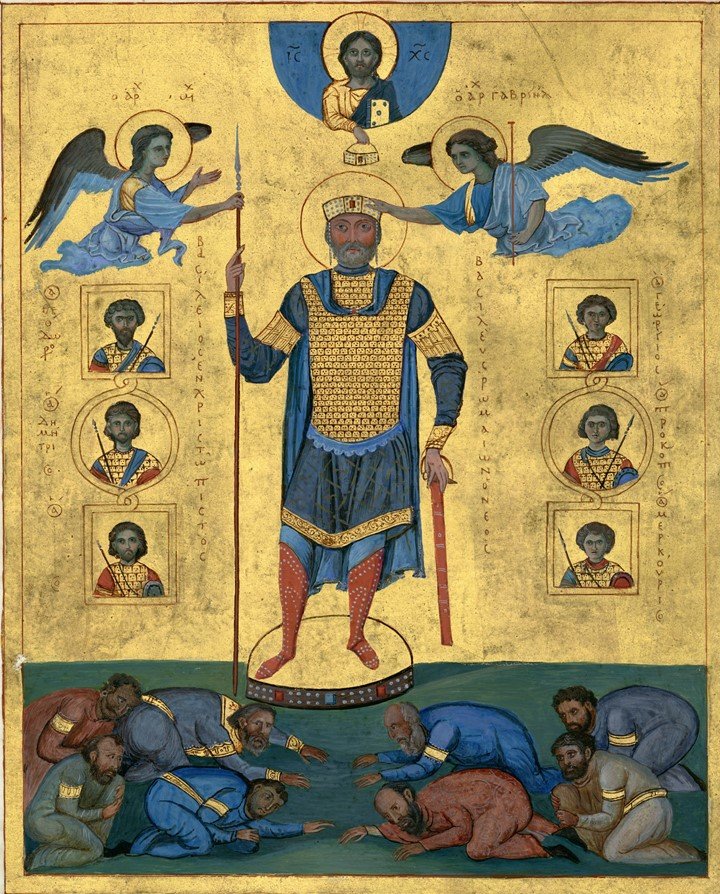
Coronation image from the Menologion of Basil II.

The Coronation portrait is the most well known depiction of Henry II in existence and the most significant and discussed image in the sacramentary. It shows the king in front of four windows decorated with alternating mosaic-patterned backgrounds with his hands reaching up to heaven, as he is crowned with a hoop crown by Christ himself who is enthroned on a rainbow in a golden aureola and is making the sign of benediction. The king wears a calf-length tunic with a belt set with gemstones and cross-patterned appliqués and a blue cloak which is held shut by a gem-studded golden brooch. Tunic and cloak seem to be decorated with richly decorated gold borders on the seams. This regal clothing signifies the solemnity of the coronation ceremony. In addition Henry wears dotted hose and golden shoes.

Four haloed figures assist the ruler in pairs. Two of these are angels, who fly down from heaven to present the king with the Holy Lance and the Imperial Sword which they hold reverently in veiled hands. Both items are contained within gem-studded cases and cannot therefore be used as weapons, but they are nevertheless not recognisable as Imperial regalia. Instead, the Holy Lance, which is highlighted by its position to the right of Christ, is marked out as the Tree of Life by the small crucifix atop a golden globe which crowns it and by budding branches on its shaft. In addition to the angels there are two bishops in pontifical vestments who support the ruler's arms: One, whose grey hair marks him as the older of the two, is identified as St. Ulrich, the converter of Augsburg in 993 who had been canonised only ten years before the completion of the sacramentary. Ulrich has the position of honour, to the right of Christ, with St Emmeram to the left. The significance of the two columns between the bishops and the king is not yet entirely clear, but they might refer to the two columns of Solomon's Temple as an expression of strength and power but also as symbols of the Old and New Testaments.

===== Inscription =====
The coronation image includes several inscriptions. These verses, apparently hexameters, run around the outside of the aureola:

| Latin | English |
|---|---|
| + CLEMENS XPE TUO LONGV[M] DA VIVERE XPICTO. VT TIBI DEUOTUS N[ON] PERDAT TEMPORIS VSUS | Gentle Christ, give long life to your anointed one, that he who is devoted to you may not lose the benefits of time |

Further tituli ring the King himself, running under his feet:

| Latin | English |
|---|---|
| + ECCE CORONATUR DIUINITUS ATQ[UE] BEATUR REX PIUS HEINRICVS P[RO]AURORUM STIRPE POLOSUS. + HUIUS UODALRICUS COR REGIS SIGNET ET ACTUS + EMMERAMUS EI FAVEAT SOLAMINE DULCI. PROPULSANS CURA[M] SIBI CONFERT ANGELUS HASTA[M]. APTAT ET HIC ENSE[M] CUI P[RAE]SIGNANDO TIMORE[M] | + Behold, he is crowned by divine providence and blessed: Pious King Henry, famous for the lineage of his ancestors. + May Ulrich seal the heart of this king and his deeds. + May Emmeram favour him with sweet solace. Repelling trouble, an angel confers the spear upon him. And this one furnishes a sword for him, foretelling his fearsomeness. |

===== Context =====
Both text and image make clear that this miniature does not depict the actual historical coronation of Henry on 7 June 1002 in Mainz Cathedral. The illuminator was more interested in indicating the king's status as viceroy of Christ on Earth. The wide outstretched arms of the King recall depictions of Moses in the camp facing the Amalekites with Aaron and Hur holding up his arms until the battle could be won with the help of god (Ex 17:8–17:16). This schema was also used for saints and bishops like Ulrich of Augsburg and Siegbert of Minden and many examples exist from this time, for example, in the Pontifical of Henry II. Since there is no model for the coronation depiction in the aforementioned Codex Aureus of St Emmeram, it seems that the composition was chosen specially for Henry, based on Byzantine ruler depictions, like the Menologion of Basil II.

==== Throne image ====
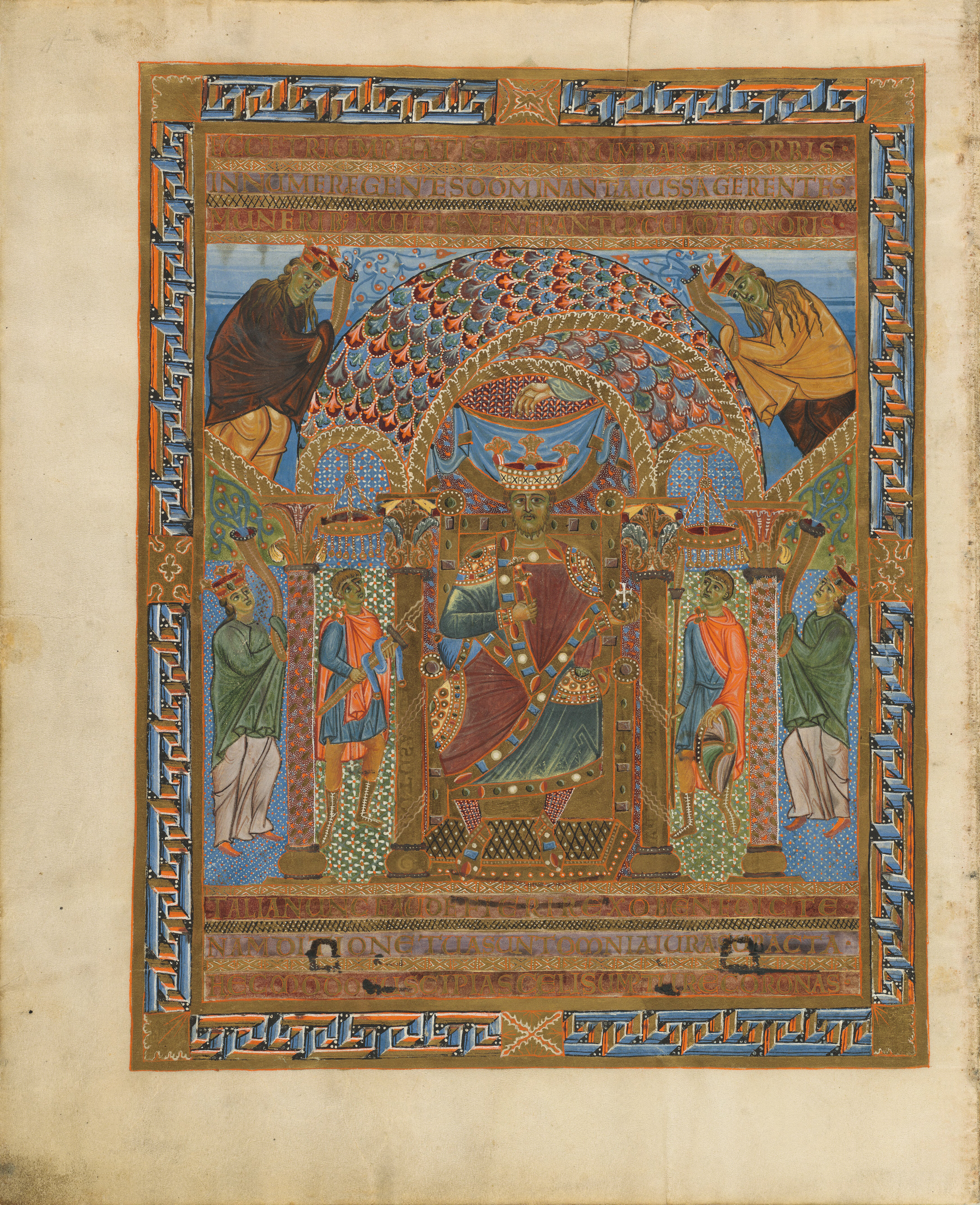
Henry II, enthroned (fol. 11v)

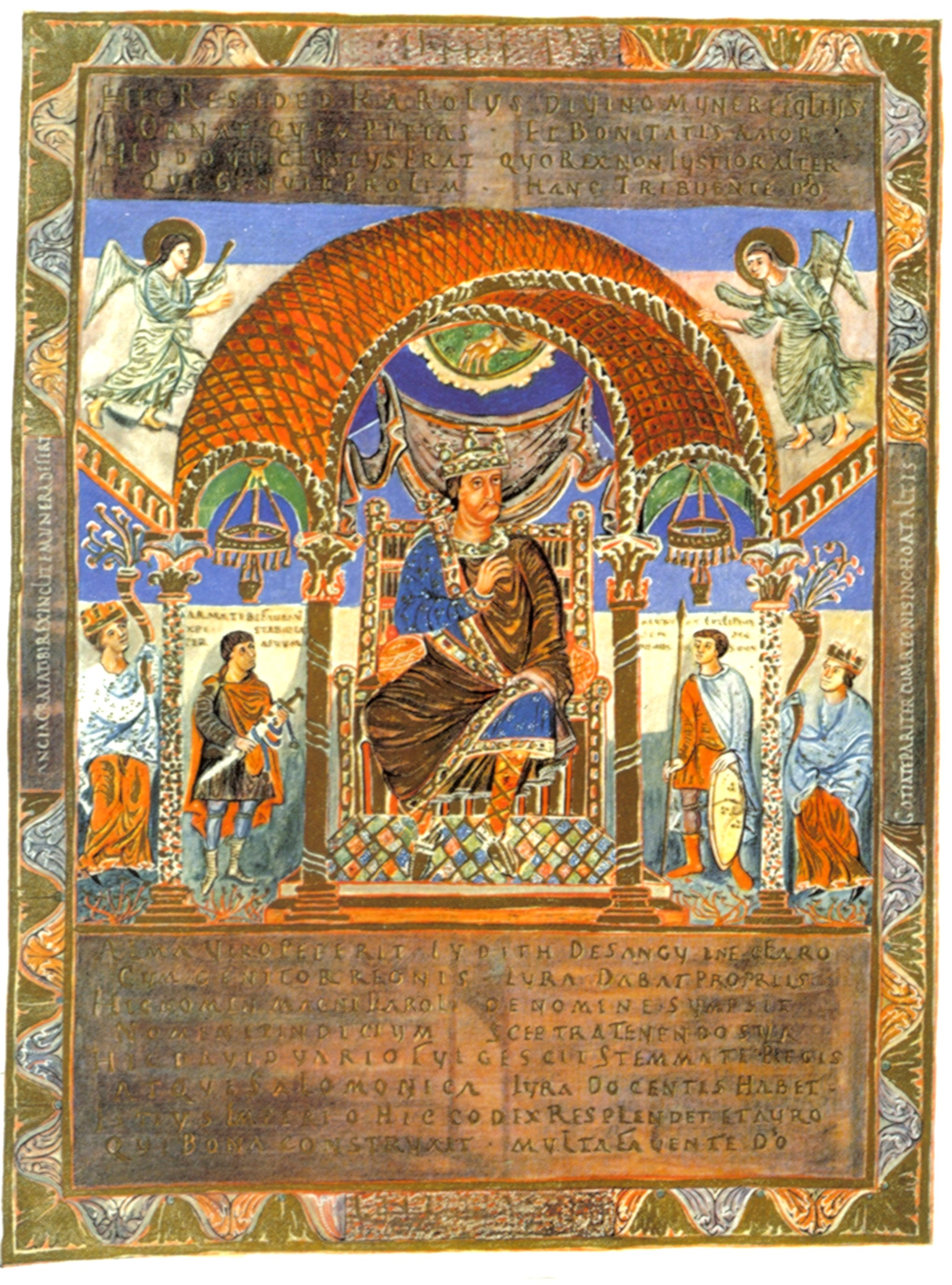
Throne image of Charles the Bald in the Codex Aureus of St Emmeram

After the coronation image comes the image of Henry II enthroned, framed by a 3D meander. In this image the king is depicted facing the viewer, sitting on a box-shaped, golden throne studded with gems under a massive Ciborium which is supported by four pillars and should be understood as a metaphor for heaven. The king's clothing is even more luxuriantly decorated than in the coronation image, with large appliqués; the crown however lacks a hoop. In his right hand the king holds a small cross sceptre and in his left hand he holds a Globus cruciger. A cloth of honour is hung behind his head; above it is the Hand of God making the sign of benediction.

Two youthful squires in short tunics flank him, offering him a sword, lance, and shield covered with cloth. They are standing in tall, narrow arcades with wheel chandeliers hanging down from the vaults. Beyond them stand two crowned women with raised cornucopiae with blooming vines growing out of them. There are also two figures in three quarter view in the spandrels next to the baldachin - personifications of tribute bearing subject peoples.

The green colour of the figures' faces is very noticeable - it suggests a high degree of sacredness by giving Henry and the figures who surround him a particular degree of (as it were) anticipated other worldliness.

The easily readable golden inscription in three hexameter lines above and below the image says

| Latin | English |
|---|---|
| ECCE TRIUMPHATIS TERRARUM PARTIB[US] ORBIS. INNUMER[A]E GENTES DOMINANTIA IUSSA GERENTES MUNERIBUS MULTIS VENERANTUR CULM[EN] HONORIS. TALIA NUNC GAUDE FIERI REX O BENEDICTE NAM DITIONE TUA SUNT OMNIA IURA SUBACTA H[A]EC MODO SUSCIPIAS C[A]ELI SUMPTURE CORONAS. | Behold! All regions of the globe of Earth being conquered, innumerable races bearing his masterful commands venerate the font of honour with many gifts. Rejoice that now these things are happening, blessed King, for all laws are brought under your command. Only take these things into your protection, you who are about to assume heaven's crowns. |

A very similar image of Charles the Bald found in the Codex Aureus of St Emmeram is the inspiration for this coronation image.

==== Image of Gregory ====
After the two images of Henry comes a miniature depicting St Gregory the Great dressed as Pope wearing pontifical robes and a golden maniple over his left arm. He is sitting under the arch of an arcade in a construction with round arches, Oeils-de-boeuf and a corner tower, which is more building than chair. As appropriate for the author of the Sacramentarium Gregorianum, Gregory is depicted facing to the right holding a quill and a scraping knife for erasing as signs of his authorship of the sacramentary, whose text he composed under the inspiration of the Holy Ghost, which is symbolised by a white dove flying overhead from the right. In the vine tendrils about his head his name is concealed, inscribed with linked letters: GREG[orius] P[a]P[a]. The same composition was also depicted a second time in silver plate on the back cover by a goldsmith.

=== Cover ===
The front cover of the book consists of an ivory relief with a depiction of the Crucifixion in the upper part and the women discovering the Empty Tomb in the lower part. This very high quality work was probably made in Lotharingia around 908/90 - i.e. a short time before the sacramentary itself. The simple border made from a sheet of gold derives from a subsequent restoration and reworking of the cover in Bamberg, probably in the 18th century. The ivory relief, surrounded by an acanthus frieze, is essentially symmetrical. The centre shows the cross with Jesus on it with the great tabula ansata at his head with the text: IHS NAZAREN | REX IVDEORV ("Jesus of Nazareth, King of the Jews") in capital letters. The snake, defeated by the sacrificial death of Jesus is wrapped around the foot of the cross. Below this, retaining the same central axis, is the hill of Golgotha and mourning angels. Three angels with their heads behind a band of cloud appear on either side of the centre line, as do the Sun and the Moon (which signify the cosmological significance of the scene), Mary and John, Longinus with the lance and Stephaton with the vinegar sponge, and finally the blessed who rise from sarcophagi in pairs. In the scene below the cross the angel mediates between the empty tomb on the left with two sleeping guards next to it and the three women approaching with anointing vessels at right.

The back cover is an image of the enthroned Pope Gregory the Great in Opus interrasile. The silk cover which was installed much later is now preserved only in fragments. Gregory is depicted here not as an author but as an editor, who removes faulty readings in the text with a scraper at the direction of an angel. This depiction has no iconographic connection to the miniature on fol. 12r of the manuscript.

The clasps of the cover are broad chains of gilt silver. The upper clasp probably belongs to the original cover, the lower one is a later work.

== History ==
The sacramentary contains numerous references to the St. Emmeram's Abbey in Regensburg where it was created and to Henry II who paid for its production. The reference to Henry as King (REX) allows its creation to be dated to before 1014 when Henry was crowned Emperor. The strong support of the dioceses of Regensburg and Augsburg in advancing Henry's candidature could explain the prominent place of saints from Augsburg and Regensburg rather than from Bamberg. In that case a completion before the foundation of the diocese of Bamberg in 1007 seems likely. It was probably originally created for Regensburg Cathedral and the sacramentary is first found in 1012 in connection with the dedication of Bamberg Cathedral. Additions following the synods of 1058 and 1087 before the original text (fol. 1v–3v) made at Bamberg indicate its essentially local value. During secularisation in 1803, the manuscript was at length taken to Munich. The sacramentary served as the model for further manuscripts in various parts of the Empire, especially in Hildesheim and Minden.

== See also ==
- Pericopes of Henry II

== Bibliography ==
- Bayerns Kirche im Mittelalter. Handschriften und Urkunden aus Bayerischem Staatsbesitz. Hirmer, München 1960, p. 24 No. 101.
- Bayerische Staatsbibliothek (Ed.). Regensburger Buchmalerei. Von frühkarolingischer Zeit bis zum Ausgang des Mittelalters. Ausstellungskatalog der Bayerischen Staatsbibliothek. München 1987, pp. 32–33 No. 16 & tables 5–8, pp. 94–95.
- Gude Suckale-Redlefsen. Prachtvolle Bücher zur Zierde der Kirchen. in Josef Kirmeier, Bernd Schneidmüller, Stefan Weinfurter, Evamaria Brockhoff (ed.) Kaiser Heinrich II. 1002–1024. Wissenschaftliche Buchgesellschaft, Darmstadt 2002, ISBN 978-3-8062-1712-4, pp. 52–61.
- Josef Kirmeier (Ed.). Zwei Regensburger Prachthandschriften. Das Sakramentar Kaiser Heinrichs II. Der Uta-Codex. (= Handschriften aus bayerischen Bibliotheken auf CD-ROM), Haus der Bayerischen Geschichte, Augsburg 2003, ISBN 3-927233-87-0.
- Franz-Reiner Erkens. Herrschersakralität im Mittelalter. Von den Anfängen bis zum Investiturstreit. Kohlhammer, Stuttgart 2006, ISBN 978-3-17-017242-5, pp. 179–188 (Excerpts on Google Books).
- Sakramentar Heinrichs II. Handschrift Clm 4456 der Bayerischen Staatsbibliothek, München. Faksimile und Kommentarband, Faksimile-Verlag, Gütersloh/ München 2010, ISBN 978-3-577-12908-4.
- Werner Taegert. Schatz für die Ewigkeit – Buchstiftungen Kaiser Heinrichs II. für seinen Dom (Abs. Sakramentar Heinrichs II.). in Norbert Jung, Wolfgang F. Reddig. Dem Himmel entgegen. 1000 Jahre Kaiserdom Bamberg 1012–2012. Katalog der Sonderausstellung (= Veröffentlichungen des Diözesanmuseums Bamberg. Bd. 22). Michael Imhof Verlag, Petersberg 2012, ISBN 978-3-86568-754-8, pp. 107–113 (with further bibliography).
