= Ramwod =

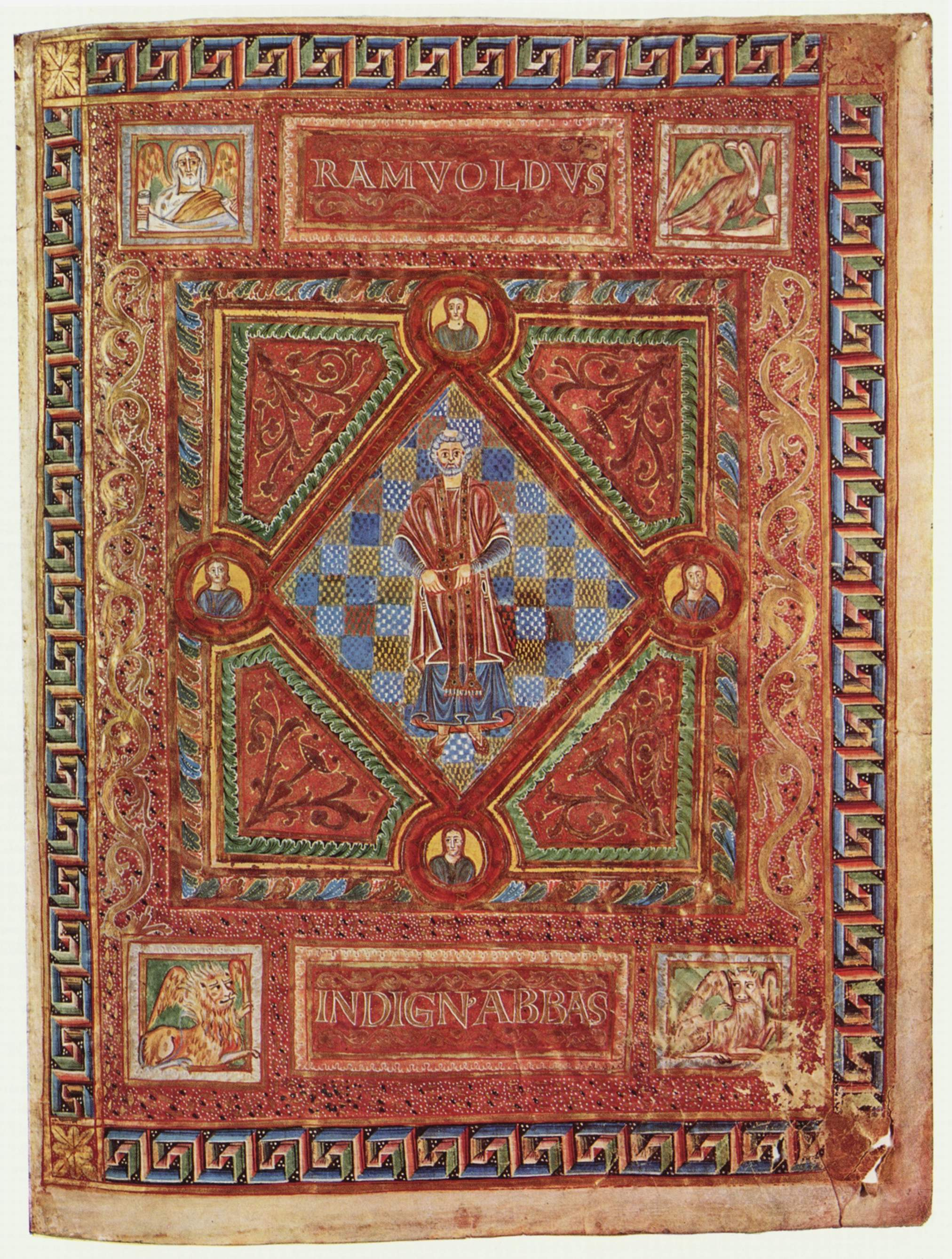
Portrait of Ramwod on the Codex Aureus of St. Emmeram

Ramwod or Ramwold (c. 900 in Trier (?) - 17 May 1000 in Regensburg) was an abbot of St. Emmeram's Abbey in Regensburg. He is a patron for those suffering optical ailments, since he was blind for two years and then regained his sight. He was beatified; his feast day is 17 June.

Initially a Benedictine at St. Maximin's Abbey in Trier, Ramwold was called to Regensburg by Wolfgang of Regensburg in 975. As the first 'autonomous abbot' of St. Emmeram's Abbey, he led the institution to become a prominent intellectual and religious center of its era, particularly renowned for its advancements in book illumination.

== Bibliography ==
- Ekkart Sauser (1998). "Ramwod". In Bautz, Traugott (ed.). Biographisch-Bibliographisches Kirchenlexikon (BBKL) (in German). Vol. 14. Herzberg: Bautz. cols. 1384–1385. ISBN 3-88309-073-5.
