= Saint Emmeram's Abbey =

German abbey

Coordinates: 49°0′55″N 12°5′34″E

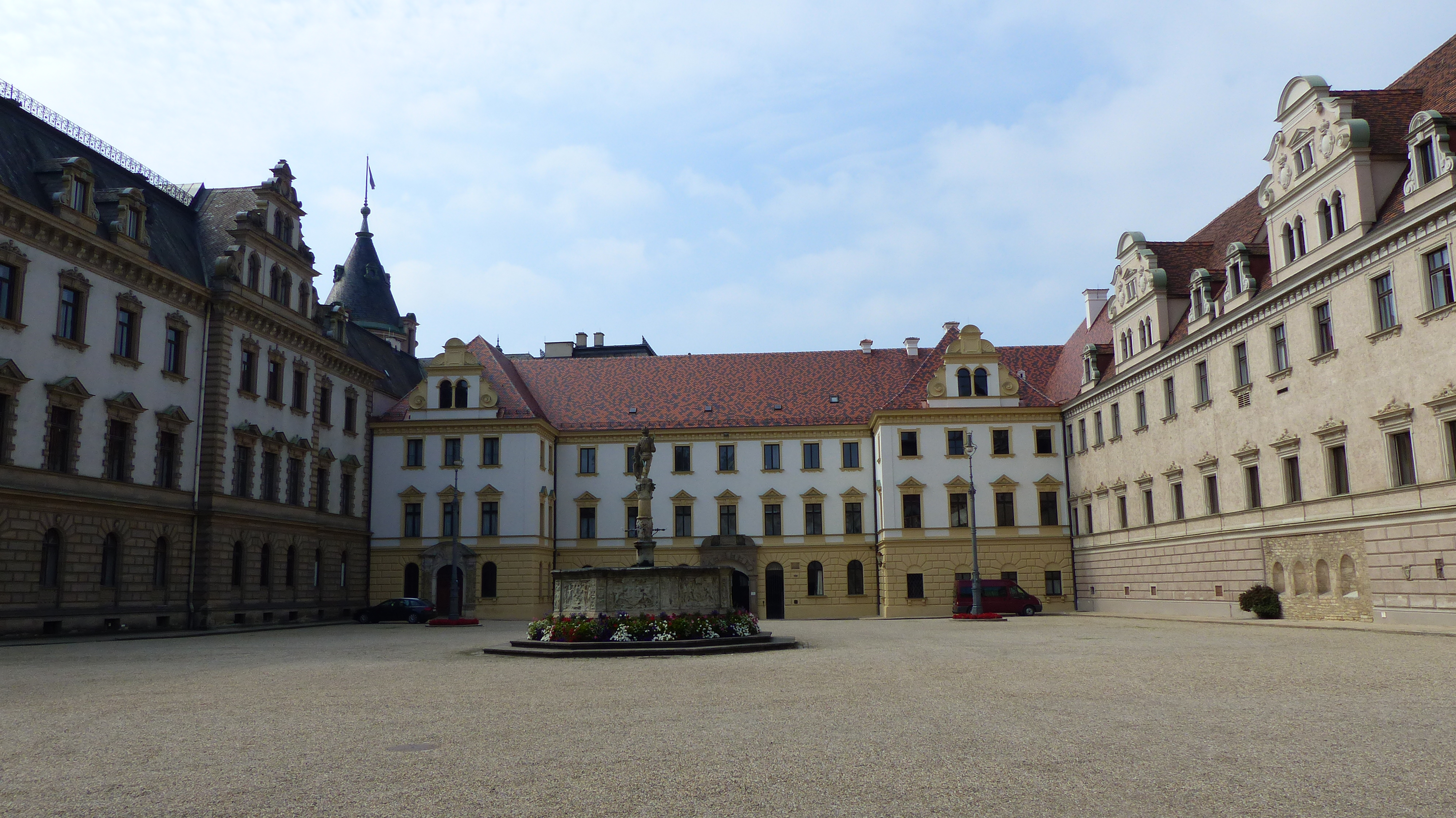
- Interactive map of Saint Emmeram's Abbey

Monastery information
- Order: Benedictine
- Established: c. 739

Site
- Location: Regensburg, Germany

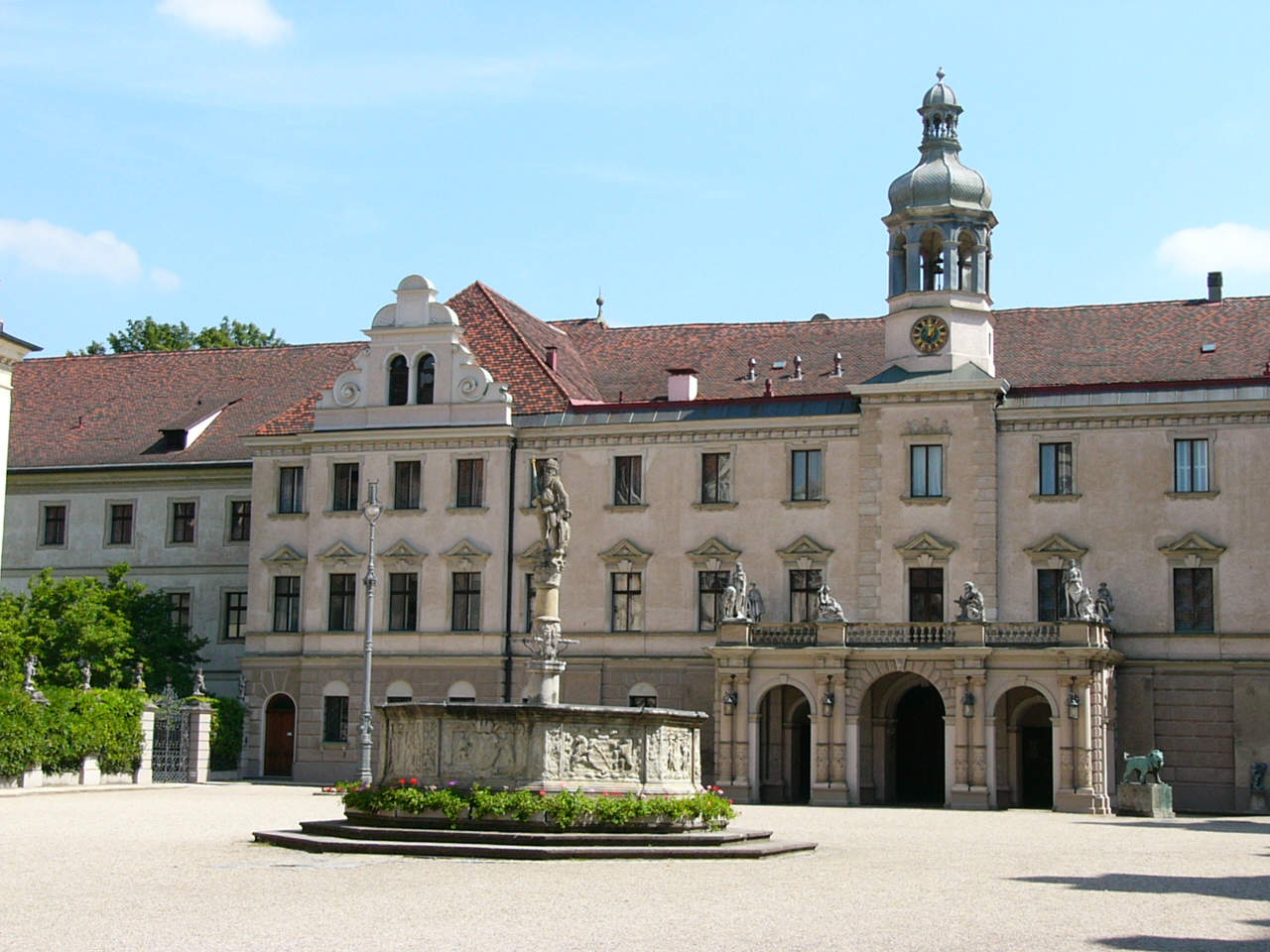
Small section of the extensive St. Emmeram's buildings

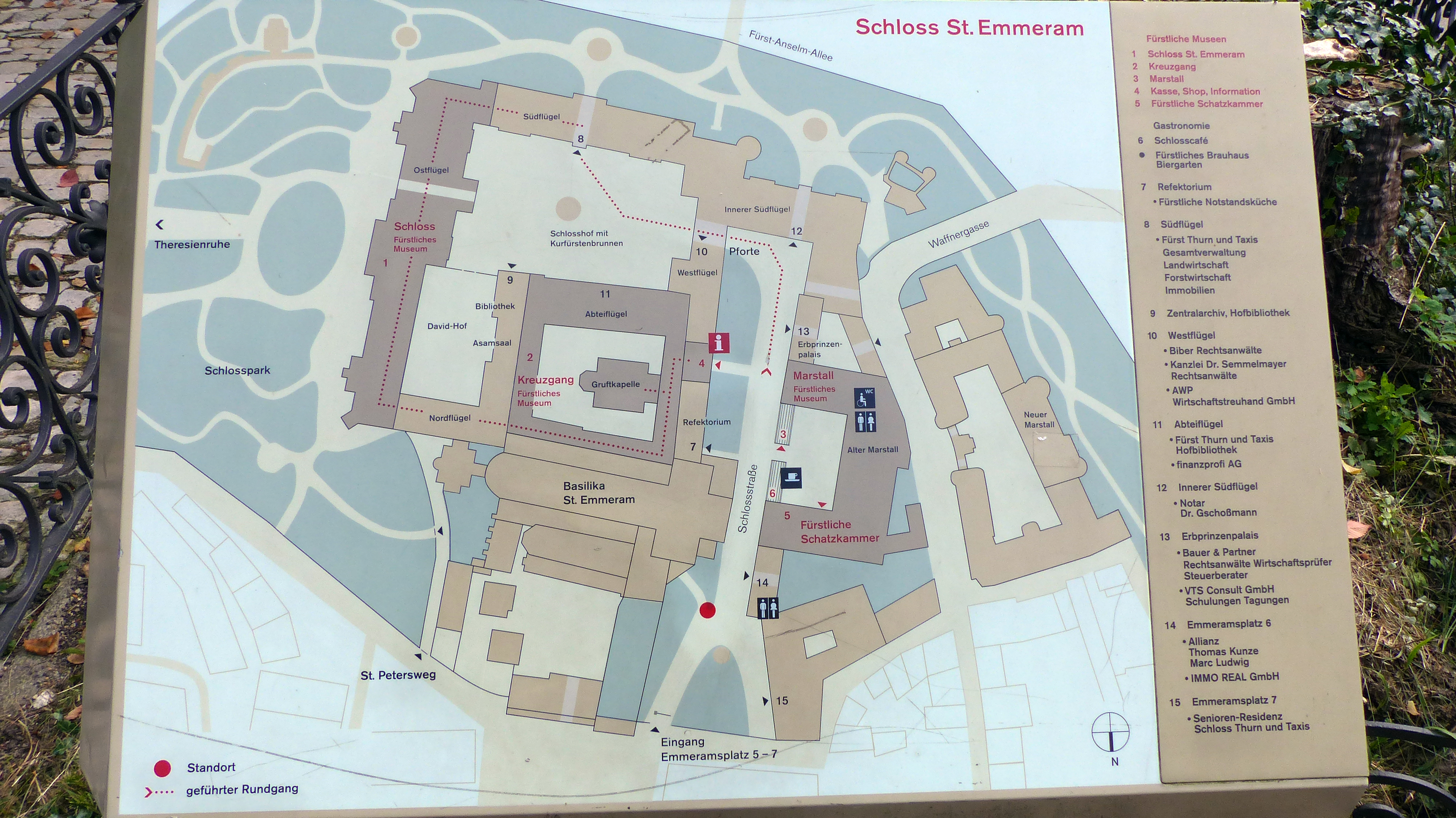
Map of the site in 2014

Saint Emmeram's Abbey (German: Kloster Sankt Emmeram or Reichsabtei Sankt Emmeram) was a Benedictine monastery founded around 739 at Regensburg in Bavaria (modern-day southeastern Germany) at the grave of the itinerant Frankish bishop Saint Emmeram who had died around 650. The original abbey church is now a parish church named St. Emmeram's Basilica. The other buildings on the site form a large complex known as Schloss Thurn und Taxis or Schloss St. Emmeram, which has served as the main residence of the Thurn und Taxis princely family since the early 19th century.

== History ==
The monastery was built next to the then still partially preserved remains of Castra Regina, a Roman legionary camp (castrum) on the Danube frontier, built for Legio III Italica during the reign of Emperor Marcus Aurelius. A civil settlement (vicus) next to it had remained continuously inhabited ever since. It lay on the northern border of the Duchy of Bavaria, which was part of the Merovingian kingdom from the sixth through the eighth century.

The monastery of the Benedictines was founded around 739. The abbey church (since 1964 a basilica minor) was begun around 780, as a replacement for a previous church dedicated to Saint George, into which the mortal remains of Saint Emmeram had been transferred from Aschheim near Munich around 690. In the early times, the bishops of Regensburg were abbots in commendam, so in a dual role, a common practice at the time which was not always to the advantage of the abbeys concerned. In 975, Saint Wolfgang of Regensburg, then bishop of Regensburg and abbot of St. Emmeram's, voluntarily gave up the position of abbot and severed the connection, making the abbots of St. Emmeram's independent of the bishopric. He was one of the first German bishops to do this, and his example in this was much copied across Germany in the years following. The first independent abbot was Ramwold (later the Blessed Ramwold). Both he and Saint Wolfgang were advocates of the monastic reforms of Gorze. Between 972-974, two charters were issued by the duchess of Bavaria, Judith, granting property in Aiterhofen to the monastery. The second charter stated that if any bishop used the property for personal use or gave it to vassals, it would be repossessed by her heirs.

About a century and a half after the monastery was founded, Arnulf of Carinthia (850-899), the penultimate Emperor of the Carolingian dynasty, chose Regensburg as his capital and St Emmeram as his favorite monastery. His imperial residence, a so-called Kaiserpfalz, stood ″in vicinitate″, in the immediate vicinity, of the monastery, as Arnold of Saint Emmeram writes. The emperor had gifted the monastery the famous manuscript Codex Aureus of Saint Emmeram, which originated from the Carolingian palace school in Saint-Denis around 870. He and his son Louis the Child were buried in the abbey church. According to recent research, it is considered largely certain that Emperor Arnulf had already built his palace before 892 on the site of the monastery's present-day gatehouse on the square Emmeramsplatz. The palace was thus located north of the monastery church, while the monks' cloister bordered the church to the south. After comparisons with other Carolingian palace complexes and analysis of the building fabric, it was determined that the ceremonial hall of the imperial palace, the so-called aula regia, once extended between the preserved Romanesque gate house and the present entrance hall of St Emmeram's basilica. The lower part of the gatehouse, built around 1170, still features reused ancient Roman stone blocks and behind them presumably remains of the aula walls. This flat-roofed building had two naves, seven bays and a double apse in the south. The residential and administrative buildings of the Carolingian palace complex were thus located on the adjacent site, where today the freestanding Renaissance bell tower stands. The imperial palace was probably later used by the Burgraves of Regensburg from the Babonen family, from which a famous minnesinger (died after 1185) also came.

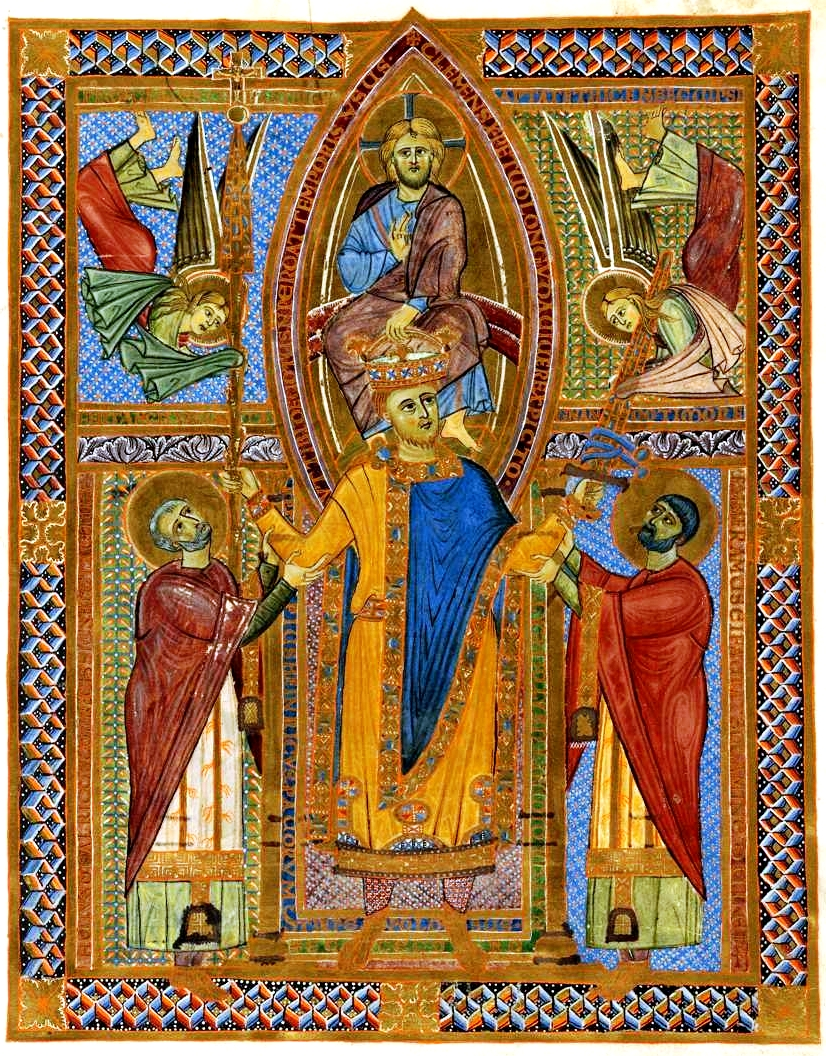
Sacramentary of Henry II, produced between 1002 and 1014 for Emperor Henry II at the scriptorium of St Emmeram's

Saint Wolfgang, who was made bishop in 972, ordered that a library be constructed at St. Emmeram shortly after his arrival in Regensburg. An active scriptorium had existed at St. Emmeram in the Carolingian period, but it is not known whether it occupied a special building, and it appears that relatively few manuscripts, of poor quality, were produced there during the early tenth century. Over time, some works in the scriptorium were copied by monks, some works were preserved from the Carolingian period, and others were acquired as gifts. The library became well supplied with works by early Christian writers such as Saint Augustine, as well as by ancient writers such as Virgil and Seneca. In addition to works that had an overt religious or inspirational purpose, the library held a large collection of manuscripts used in the monastery school, focusing on subjects such as logic, arithmetic, rhetoric, grammar, and even astronomy and music. By the early eleventh century, the library at St. Emmeram had acquired a reputation for its collection. Neighboring libraries began requesting to borrow books for copying. An eleventh-century librarian at the monastery, Froumund of Tegernsee, referred to the book room as a bibliotheca, a term implying an extensive manuscript collection. St. Emmeram's scriptorium in the Early Middle Ages became a significant centre of book production and illumination, the home of works such as the Sacramentary of Henry II (produced between 1002 and 1014 for Emperor Henry II) and the Uta Codex (shortly after 1002). Henry II (c. 973/78−1024) was born in Regensburg and completed his studies here under saint bishop Wolfgang. As the last king of the Ottonian dynasty, he was later also canonized.

In 1295, the counter-king Adolf of Nassau granted the abbey the regalia and made it reichsunmittelbar (i.e., an Imperial abbey, an independent sovereign power subject directly to the emperor). The Imperial Prelates had the same rank as the Princes of the Holy Roman Empire.

The imposing, freestanding bell tower is considered the most important Renaissance building in Regensburg. It was built between 1575 and 1579, replacing an older, dilapidated tower. After a decline in its significance during the 16th century, the abbey enjoyed a resurgence in the 17th and 18th centuries under abbots Frobenius Forster, Coelestin Steiglehner, Roman Zirngibl and Placidus Heinrich, who were great scholars, particularly in the natural sciences. Under their leadership, the abbey's academy came to rival the Münchner Akademie. St. Emmeram's had a long tradition of scientific enquiry dating from the Middle Ages, in witness of which the monastery preserved the astrolabe of William of Hirsau.

In 1731, the abbots were raised to the status of Princes of the Empire (Reichsfürsten). Between 1731 and 1733, there followed the magnificent Baroque refurbishment (by the Asam brothers) of the abbey church, which had been repeatedly burnt out and repaired.

In 1803, St. Emmeram's Abbey (along with the Imperial City of Regensburg, the Bishopric of Regensburg and the two other Imperial abbeys, Niedermünster and Obermünster) lost its previous politically independent status to the newly formed Principality of Regensburg, often referred to as the Archbishopric of Regensburg, under the former Prince-Primate Carl Theodor von Dalberg. In 1803, he donated a large garden at the abbey to the Royal Bavarian Botanical Society of Regensburg for construction of a botanic garden that was maintained until 1855. After the Treaty of Paris of 1810, the entire Principality of Regensburg was transferred to Bavaria.

The treasures of St. Emmeram's Abbey (for example, the ciborium of Arnulf, now in the Residenz) and its valuable library (including Muspilli, the Codex Aureus of St. Emmeram, and Dialogus de laudibus sanctae crucis) were mostly removed to Munich.

== Schloss Thurn und Taxis ==
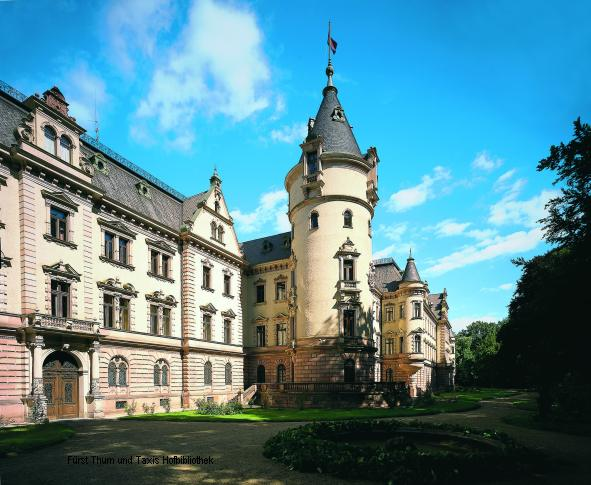
Schloss Thurn und Taxis, south wing

In 1812, the secularized monastic buildings, as well as the extensive lands of the dissolved monastery, were granted to the Princes of Thurn and Taxis, who converted the abbey into a palatial residence known from then on as Schloss Thurn und Taxis, today officially called Schloss St. Emmeram (or the Princely Palace of St Emmeram). From 1748 onwards, the Thurn and Taxis family has resided in Regensburg, as Principal Commissioners (representatives of the Holy Roman Emperor and speakers of parliament) at the Perpetual Diet of Regensburg. In 1743, Prince Alexander Ferdinand initially rented rooms in the episcopal Freisinger Hof building on Emmeramsplatz. After its fire in 1792, the family had moved into the present government building at Emmeramsplatz 8 as tenants of the Prince-Abbot of St Emmeram's Abbey. With the dissolution of the Holy Roman Empire in 1806, the imperial office of the family as well the rule of the Prince-Bishops of Regensburg came to an end.

After secularization in 1803, some monks remained in the monastery. With the end of the Holy Roman Empire and the dissolution of the Imperial Diet in 1806, the city faced the threat of the Thurn and Taxis family relocating to Frankfurt am Main, where the Imperial Postal Services (Kaiserliche Reichspost), founded by the family in the 16th century and operated by them ever since, was still located in the Palais Thurn und Taxis. This threatened the loss of many jobs. Therefore, in 1810, the then sovereign, Prince-Bishop Karl Theodor von Dalberg, who was also Grand Duke of Frankfurt and Prince-Primate of the Confederation of the Rhine − and thus political leader of large parts of the former empire – decided to transfer the extensive buildings and properties of the imperial abbey to the Thurn and Taxis family which had suffered losses due to the spread of competing postal services in the German states. However, the loss of the prestigious imperial office itself was not associated with economic losses, as the wealthy entrepreneurial family had to cover its considerable representational expenses out of their own pockets.

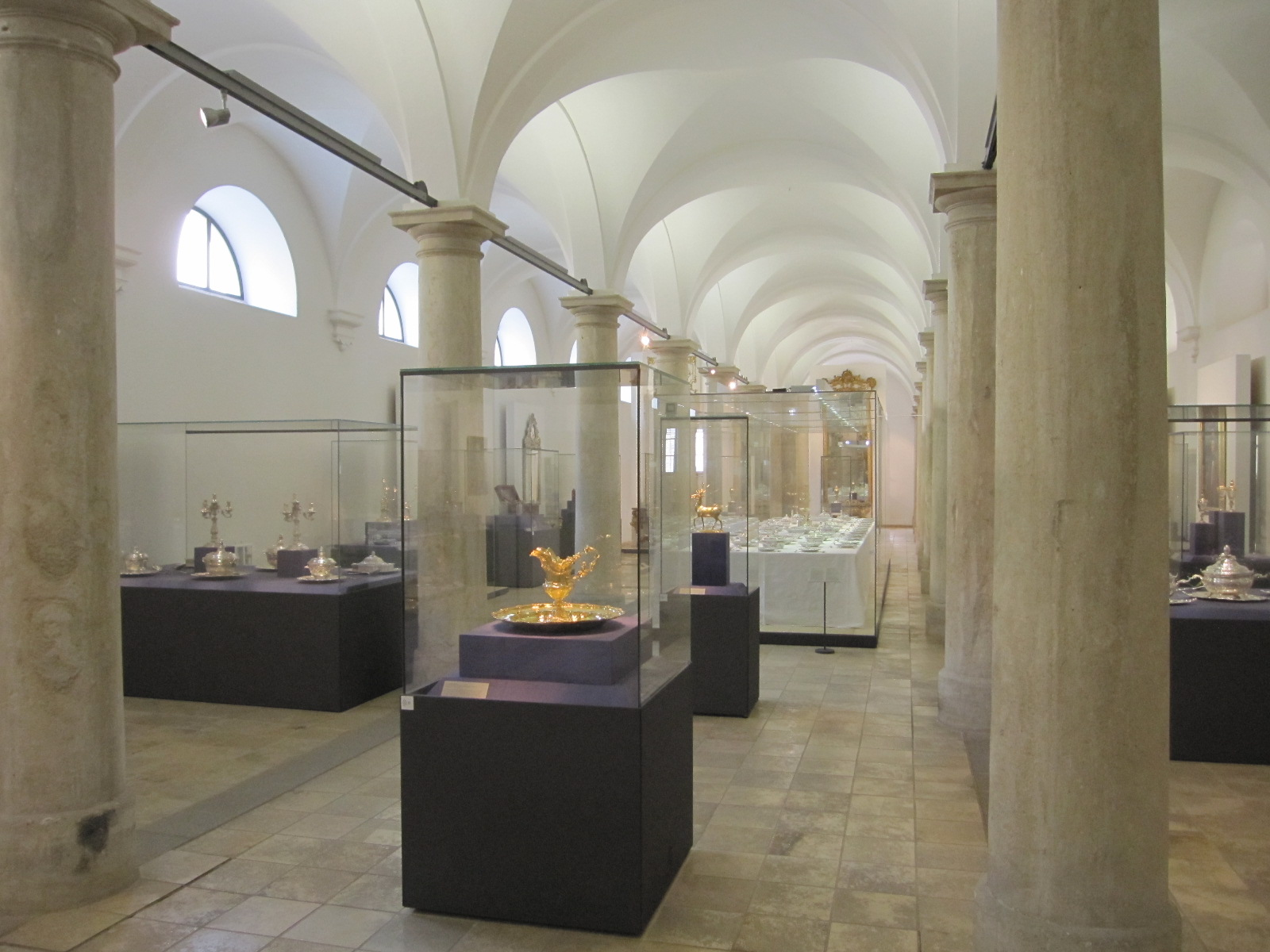
Cultural History Museum in the former stables

Under Prince Maximilian Karl, construction began in 1827 on a princely stable and a riding school with an indoor riding arena on the western part of the former monastery grounds, based on plans by the Royal Bavarian Court Architect Jean Baptiste Métivier. Two hundred workers and numerous assistants were involved in the stable construction project. The interior of the riding hall was artistically decorated with 16 plaster reliefs by the royal sculptor Ludwig Schwanthaler. Between 1835 and 1841, Prince Maximilian Karl had a burial chapel built for the princely family in the medieval monastery garden. The palace was transformed into its present form between 1883 and 1888 under Prince Maximilian Maria by the architect Max Schultze. The largest part of this construction project was the demolition of the old, dilapidated south wing with the former monastery outbuildings and the subsequent complete reconstruction of the imposing, 150-meter-long new south wing in the Neo-Renaissance style. The apartments were decorated in a neo-Rococo style; the large ballroom is particularly impressive. After 1904, the old monastery building yard was demolished and the Court Marshal's Office was built in its place. It was extended to the north by a modern second stable, which housed the carriages and the new automobiles.

The palace is the largest private residence in Germany, with 517 rooms and a floor area of 21,460 m^{2} (231,000 sq ft). The residence with its park in Regensburg's city center covers five hectares. The Thurn und Taxis princely family still uses the Schloss as its primary residence, thus it can be considered to be the family seat. However, large parts of it can be visited, including the Princely Museum, which extends across the old abbey cloister, the entire east wing, and parts of the south wing. Further parts of the museum are located in the Old Stables opposite, where the Princely Treasury can also be viewed. The private residential quarters are in the south wing, while the west wing, the Hereditary Prince's Palace and other building sections are rented out, partly to offices, partly to a retirement home or used for a library, the princely administration and an emergency kitchen for the poor, which is run by the princely family.

== St. Emmeram's Basilica ==
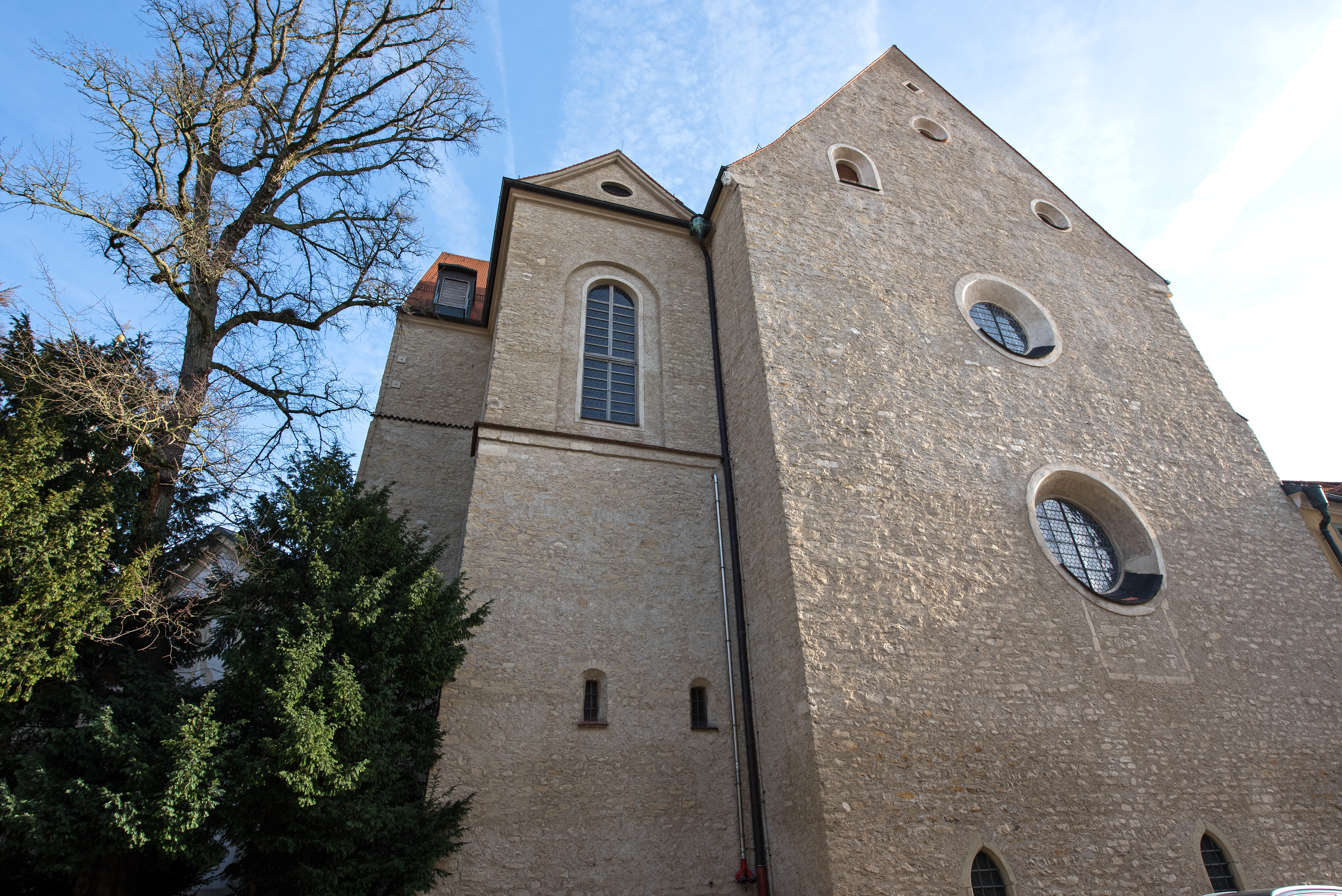
St. Emmeram's Basilica

The abbey church became a parish church, to which Pope Paul VI accorded the status of a basilica minor on 18 February 1964. The Romanesque basilica with three aisles, three choirs and a west transept is based on an original church building from the second half of the 8th century. Since that time, it has been many times partly destroyed and rebuilt. The oldest extant part of the building is the ring crypt under the choir of the northern aisle. The three medieval, carved stone reliefs on the north portal, dating from about 1052, the oldest of their type in Germany, represent Christ, Saint Emmeram and Saint Denis. The west transept has a painted wooden ceiling depicting Saint Benedict of Nursia. The crypt of Saint Wolfgang is beneath the choir of Saint Denis. Next to Saint Denis's altar in the northern aisle is the tomb of Emma, Queen of the East Franks (died 876), let into the wall. The high altar dates from 1669. The tower has six bells.

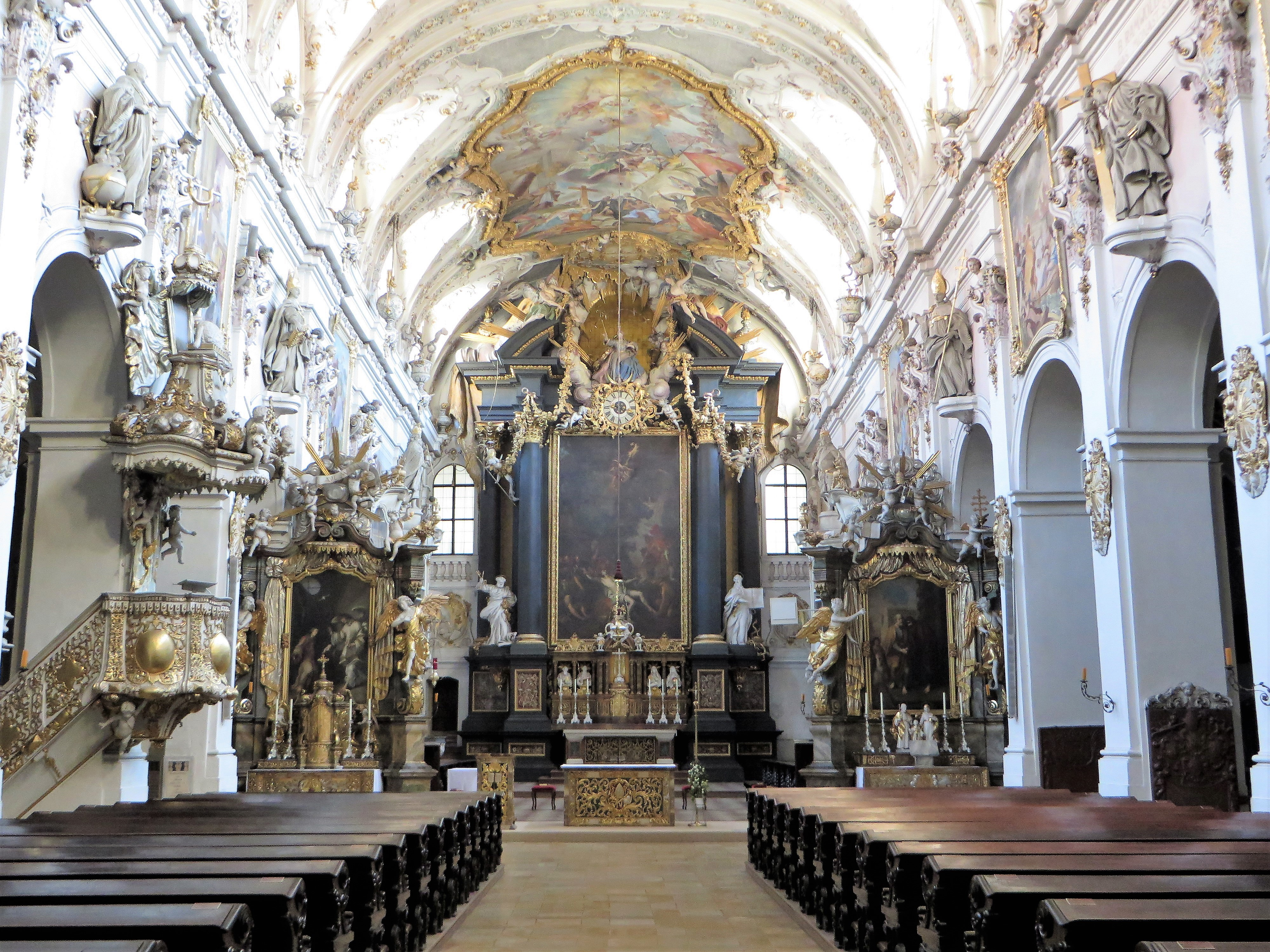
Central nave of the church and apse with high altar and two side altars

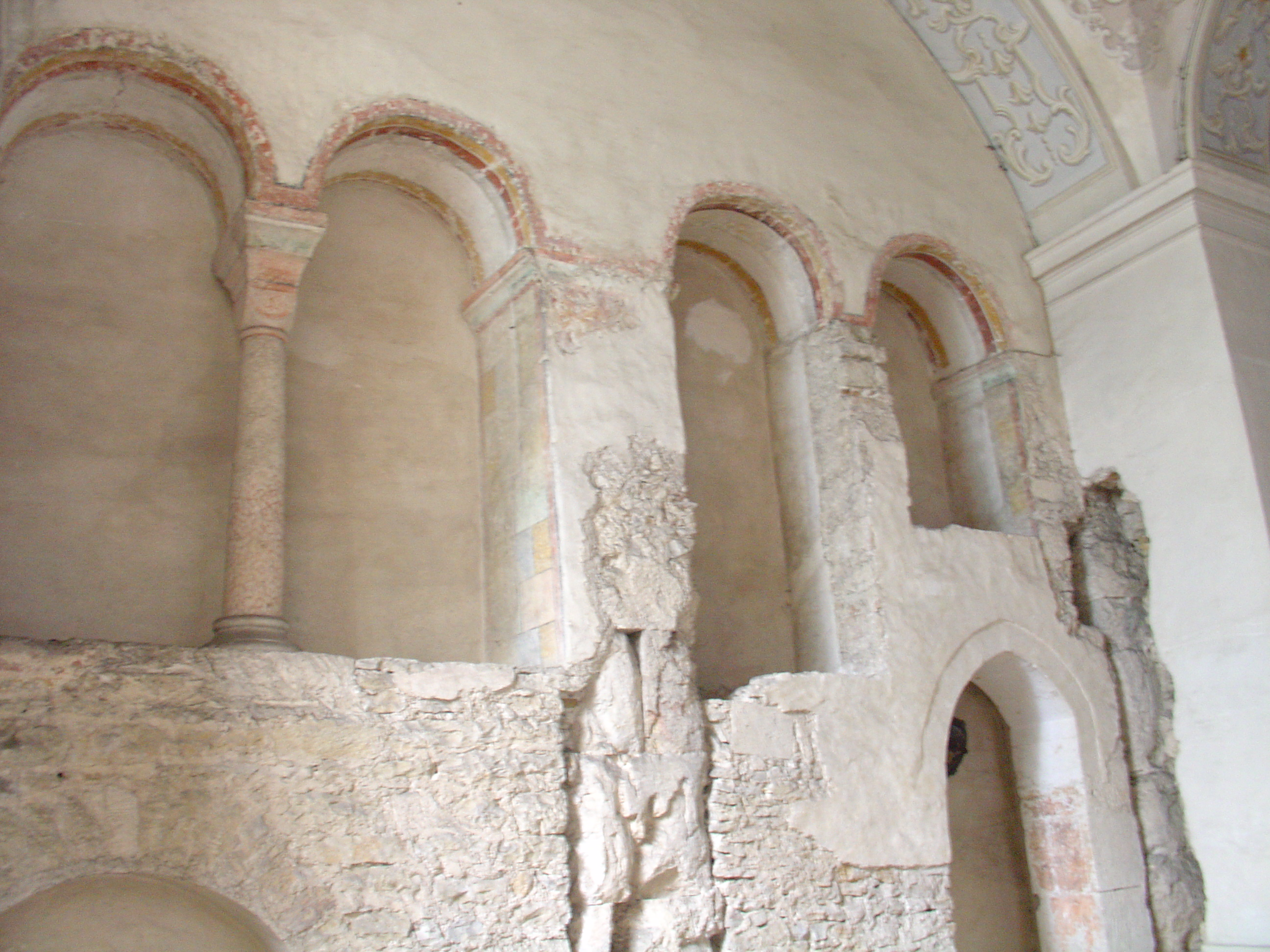
Large square pillars of the Ramwold church building from around 980/1000

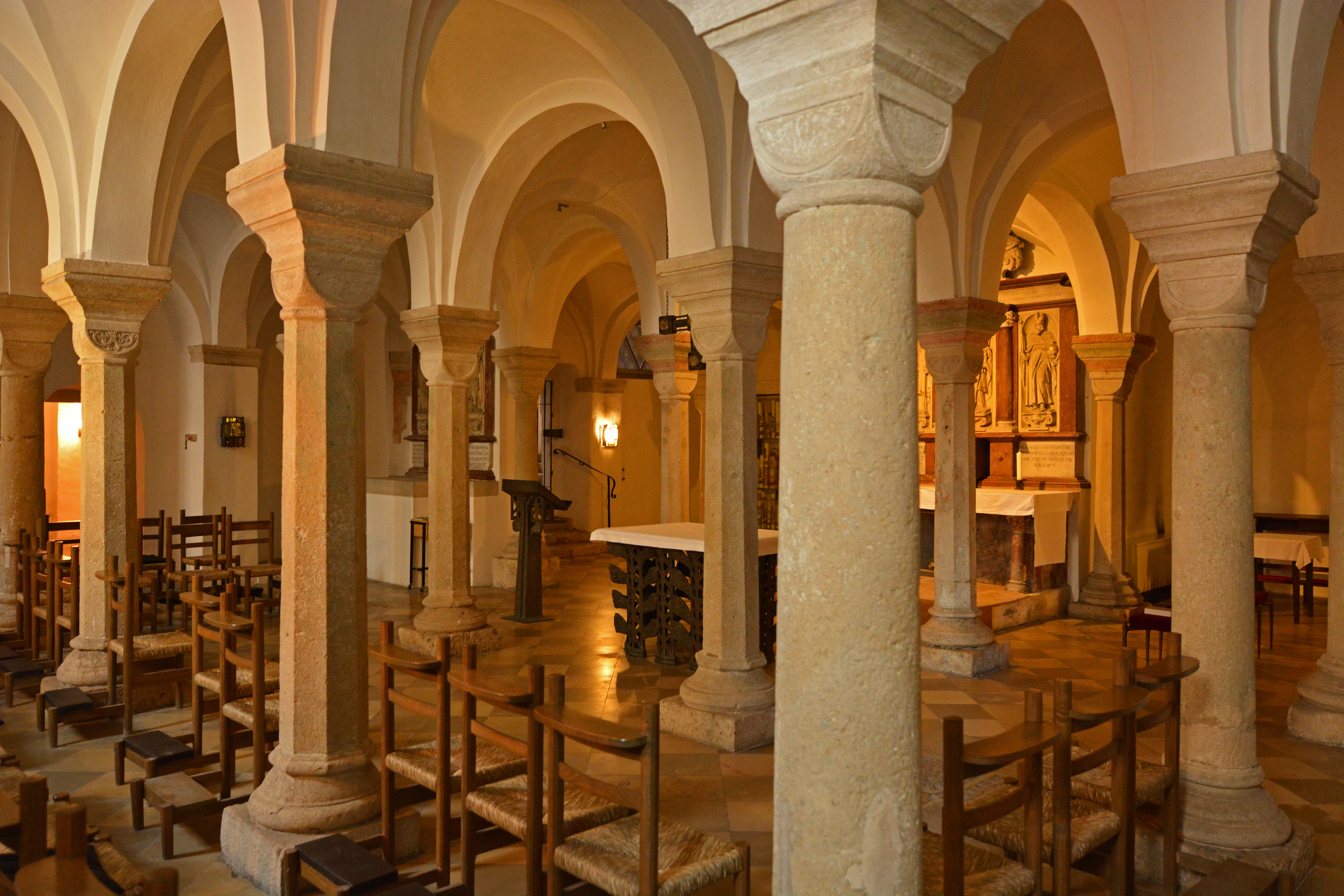
Wolfgang Crypt in the west building (c. 1050)

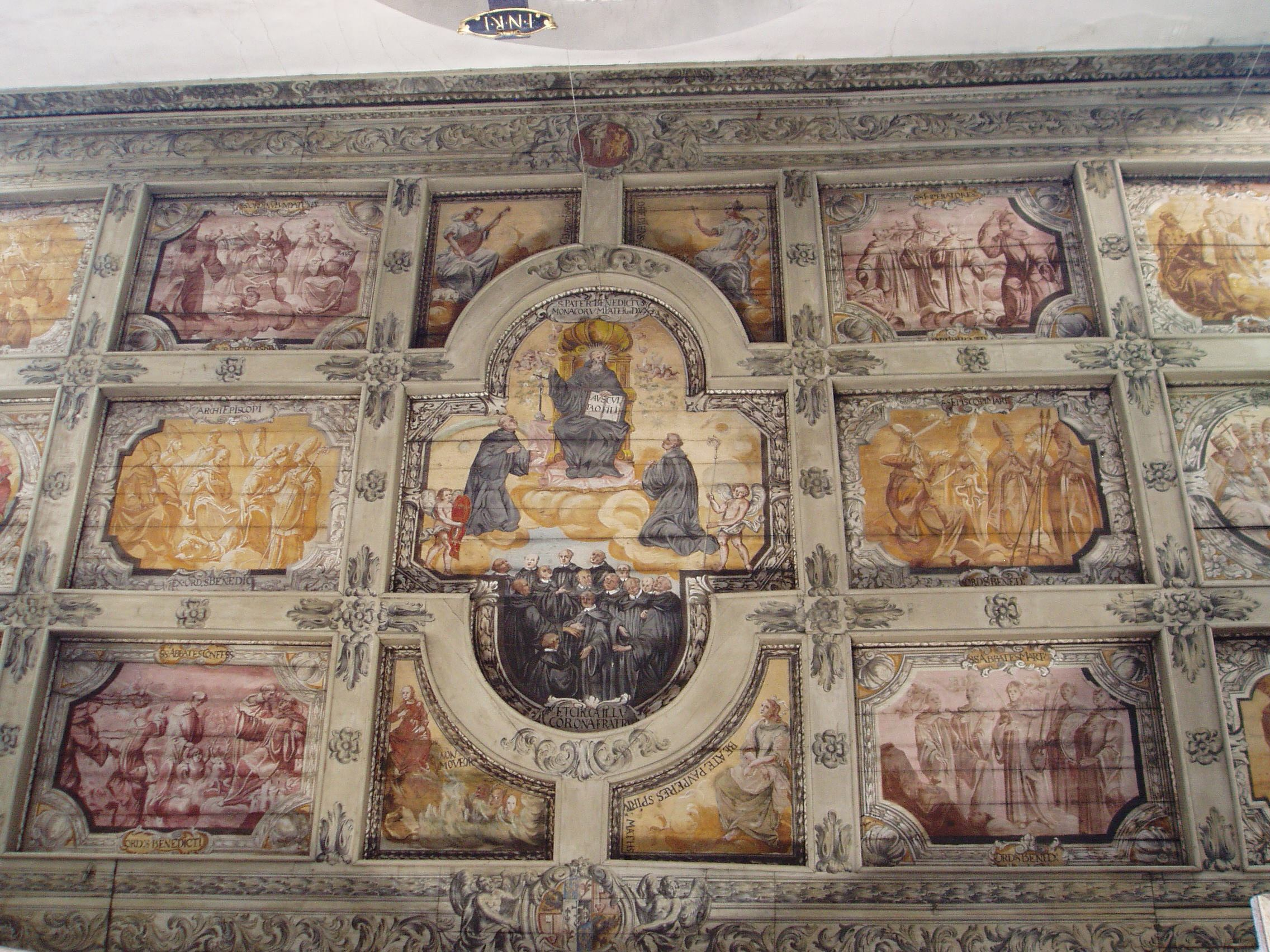
Painted wooden ceiling depicting Saint Benedict of Nursia

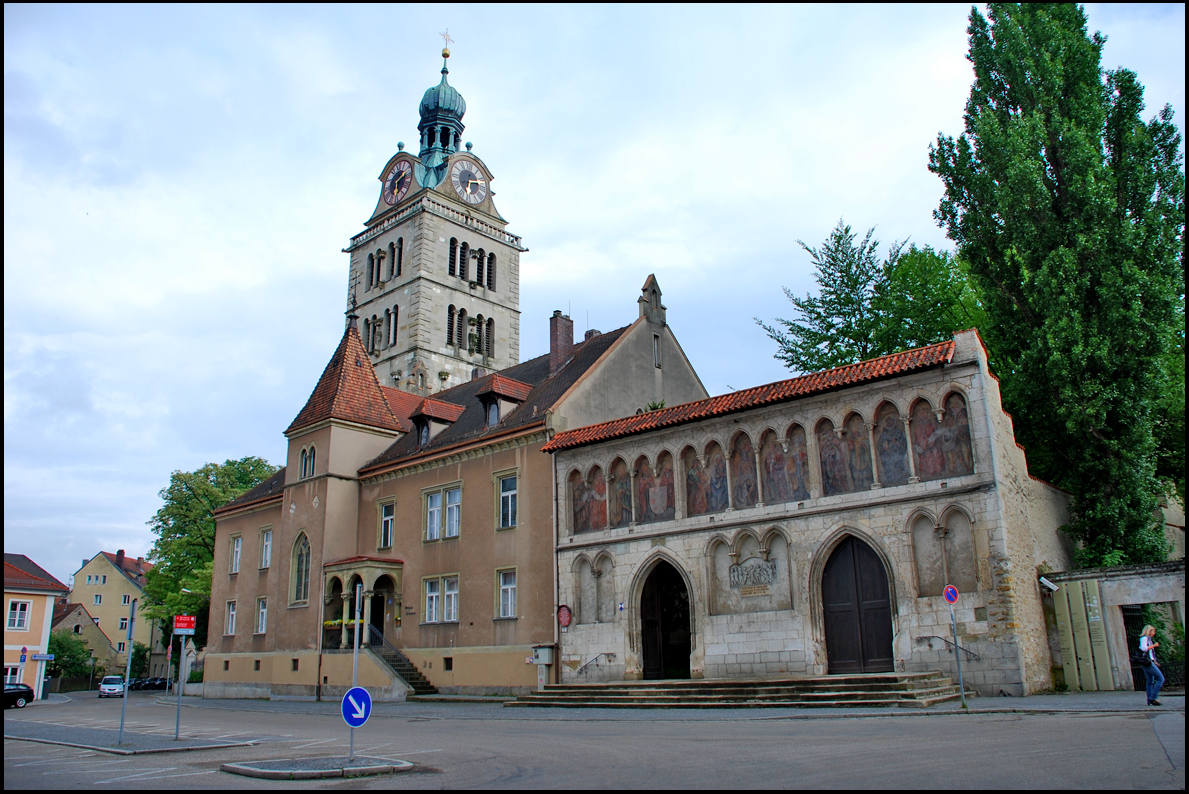
The Romanesque gate house (c. 1170), site of the previous aula regia of Emperor Arnulf (c. 890), in the back the Renaissance bell tower

=== Notable burials ===
- Saint Emmeram
- Saint Wolfgang
- Blessed Ramwold
- Emma, Queen of the East Franks (consort of Louis the German)
- Blessed Aurelia, anchorite
- The Blessed Bishops Wolflek, Gaubald and Tuto
- Arnulf of Carinthia, King of the East Franks and Holy Roman Emperor
- His son, King Louis the Child
- Arnulf the Wicked, Duke of Bavaria
- Relics of Saints Maximianus and Calcidonius
- Johannes Aventinus, historian of Bavaria
- Engelberga, wife of Louis II, Holy Roman Emperor

== St. Rupert's church ==
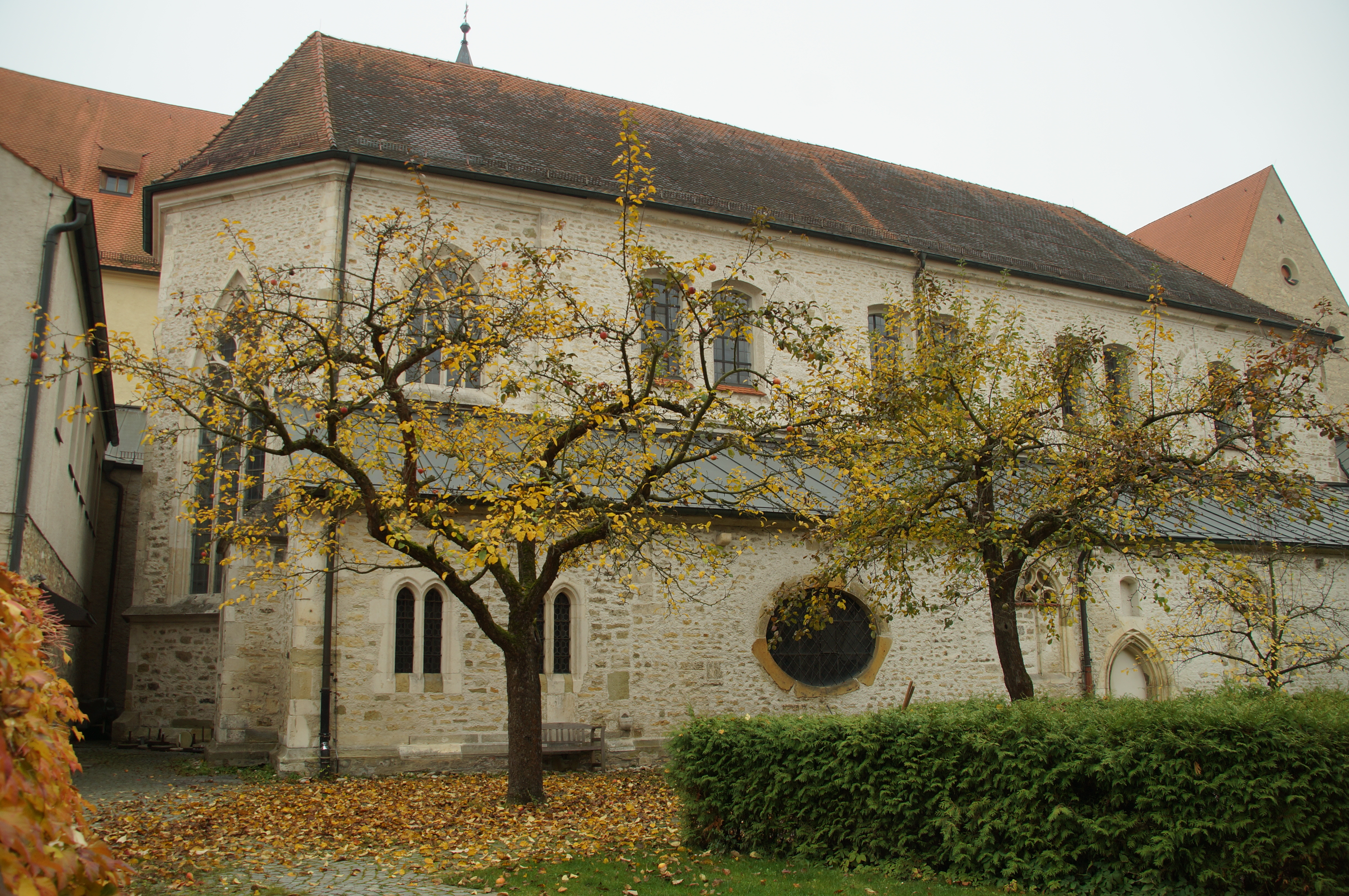
St. Rupert's church

St. Rupert's church was formerly the parish church of the monastery. The church, with two aisles, was constructed in the second half of the 11th century, but was frequently adapted and enlarged. The nave is from the 14th century, the choir from 1405, the high altar with four pillars and a picture of the baptism of Duke Theodo of Bavaria by Saint Rupert from 1690, and the decoration and fittings from the 17th and 18th centuries. The tabernacle on the north side of the choir has figures of Saint Rupert and other saints. The altar of Saint Michael dated from 1713. The nave is decorated with pictures of the miracles of Saint Rupert.

== Abbots ==
=== Bishops of Regensburg (abbots ex officio) ===
- Gaubald (739–761)
- Sigerich (762–768)
- Sintpert (768–791)
- Adalwin (792–816)
- Baturich (817–847)
- Erchanfrid (c. 847–864)
- Ambricho (c. 864–891)
- Aspert (891–894)
- Tuto (c. 894–930)
- Isangrim (930–941)
- Gunther (942)
- Michael (c. 942–972)
- Wolfgang (972–975)

=== Abbots ===
- Blessed Ramwold (975–1001)
- Wolfram (1001–1006)
- Richolf (1006–1028)
- Hartwich (1028–1029)
- Burkhard (1030–1037)
- Ulrich I (1037-1042)
- Erchanbert (1042–1043)
- Peringer I (1044–1048)
- Reginward (1048–1060 ?)
- Eberhard I (c. 1060–1068)
- Rupert (1068–1095)
- Pabo (1095 – c. 1106)
- Reginhard (c. 1106–1129?)
- Engelfrid (1129–1142)
- Pabo (2nd time) (1142–1143)
- Berthold I (1143–1149)
- Adalbert I (1149–1177)
- Peringer II (1177–1201)
- Eberhard II (1201–1217)
- Ulrich II (1217–1219)
- Berthold II (1219–1235)
- Wulfing (c. 1235 – c. 1247)
- Ulrich III (1247–1263)
- Friedrich I von Theuern (1263–1271)
- Ulrich IV von Prunn (1271)
- Haimo (1272–1275)
- Wolfgang I Sturm (1275–1279)
- Wernher (1279–1292)
- Karl (1292–1305)
- Heinrich von Winzer (1305–1312)
- Baldwin Kötzl (1312–1324)
- Adalbert II (Albert) von Schmidmühlen (1324–1358)
- Alto von Tannstein (1358–1385)
- Friedrich II von Weidenberg (1385–1395)
- Johannes I Hauner (1395–1402)
- Ulrich V Pettendorfer (1402–1423)
- Wolfhard Strauß (1423–1452)
- Hartung Pfersfelder (1452–1458)
- Konrad Pebenhauser (1459–1465)
- Michael Teuer (1465–1471)
- Johannes II Tegernpeck (1471–1493)
- Erasmus I Münzer (1493–1517)
- Ambrosius I Münzer (1517–1535)
- Leonhard Pfenningmann (1535–1540)
- Erasmus II Nittenauer (1540–1561)
- Blasius Baumgartner (1561–1575)
- Ambrosius II Mayrhofer (1575–1583)
- Hieronymus I Weiß (1583–1609)
- Hieronymus II Feury (1609–1623)
- Johannes III Nablaß (1623–1639)
- Placidus Judmann (1639–1655)
- Coelestin I Vogl (1655–1691)
- Ignatius von Trauner (1691–1694)
- Johannes IV Baptist Hemm (1694–1719)
- Wolfgang II Mohr (1719–1725)

=== Prince-Abbots ===
- Anselm Godin de Ampezzo (1725–1742)
- Johann V Baptist Kraus (1742–1762)
- Frobenius Forster (1762–1791)
- Coelestin II Steiglehner (1791–1803; died 1819)

== Sources ==
- Bernhardt, John W. (1987). "Servitium Regis and Monastic Property in Early Medieval Germany". Viator Medieval & Renaissance Studies. 18: 53–88.
- Kallmünz, 1992. St. Emmeram in Regensburg. Geschichte - Kunst - Denkmalpflege. Thurn und Taxis-Studien 18.
- Morsbach, P. (photos: A. Bunz), 1993: St. Emmeram zu Regensburg. Ehem. Benediktiner-Abteikirche. Großer Kunstführer Nr. 187. Schnell & Steiner: Regensburg.
- 1803 – Die gelehrten Mönche und das Ende einer 1000-jährigen Tradition. Exhibition guide. Bischöfliches Ordinariat Regensburg: Regensburg, 2003.
