= Frobenius Forster =

German Benedictine

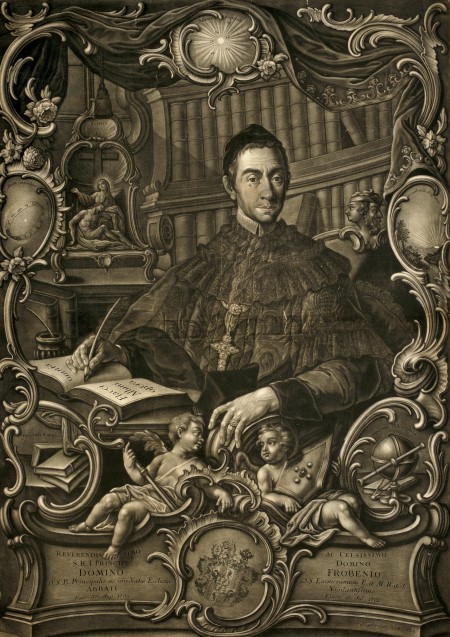

Frobenius Forster (30 August 1709, at Königsfeld in Upper Bavaria – 11 October 1791, at Ratisbon) was a German Benedictine, Prince-Abbot of St. Emmeram.

== Life ==
After studying the humanities and philosophy at Freising and Ingolstadt, he entered the Benedictine monastery of St. Emmeram at Ratisbon, where he took vows on 8 December 1728, and adopted the name "Frobenius". He made his theological studies partly at his monastery and partly at Rott, where the Bavarian Benedictines had their common study house. Shortly after his elevation to the priesthood, in 1733, he became professor of philosophy and theology at St. Emmeram and for some time held the office of master of novices.

In 1745 he was sent to the Benedictine university at Salzburg to teach philosophy and physics. Two years later he returned to his monastery where he taught philosophy and Holy Scriptures until he became librarian and prior in 1750. He had gained a reputation as a philosopher and scientist, and was one of the first religious who endeavoured to reconcile Scholastic philosophy with the Cartesian and the Leibniz-Wolffian school. Though leaning towards the Leibniz-Wolffian philosophy, he rejected many of its teachings, such as the cosmological optimism of Leibniz and the mechanism of Wolff, and was rather an eclectic than a slavish follower of any one system.

In 1759 Forster was chosen one of the first members of the newly founded Bavarian Academy of Sciences. A year later he laid down the office of prior and was appointed provost at Hohengebraching, a dependency of St. Emmeram, situated about five miles south of Ratisbon. On 24 July 1762, he was elected as successor to the deceased Prince-Abbot Johann Baptist Kraus of St. Emmeram.

Forster's election was the inauguration of the golden era of St. Emmeram. The learned new prince-abbot endeavoured to impart his own love for learning. During his reign the course given in the natural sciences at St. Emmeram became famous throughout Germany and drew scholars not only from the Benedictine monasteries of Bavaria, but also from the houses of other religious orders. In order to promote the study of Holy Scripture, Forster called the learned Maurist philologist, Charles Lancelot of St-Germain-des-Prés, who instructed the monks of St. Emmeram in Semitic languages from 1 October 1771, to 27 May 1775. To encourage his young monks still more in their respective studies, he founded a physical, a mineralogical, and a numismatic cabinet and procured the best available literature in the various branches.

== Works ==
Forster's chief literary production is his edition of the works of Alcuin which appeared in two folio volumes (4 parts) at Ratisbon in 1777. Much of it is reprinted in the Latin Patrology of Migne (vols. 100 and 101). He also wrote in Latin five short philosophical treatises and a dissertation on the Vulgate. From a codex preserved in the library of the cathedral chapter at Freising he edited the decrees of the Synod of Aschheim and made a German translation of it for "Abhandlungen der Bayr. Akad. der Wissenschaften" (I,30-60); and from a codex in the library of St. Emmeram he published in Mansi's "Collectio Ampl. Conciliorum" (XIII, 1025–28), the decrees of a Bavarian synod held during the times of the Agilolfings.
