= Emmeram of Regensburg =

Bishop and martyr

- The Martyrdom of Emmeram, a woodcut from the incunabula of Steffen Arndes, Lübeck, 1484

Bishop and Martyr
- Born: unknown Poitiers, France
- Died: 22 September 652; Helfendorf (Munich)
- Venerated in: Roman Catholic Church; Eastern Orthodox Church
- Canonized: 1833, Regensburg by Pope Gregory XVI
- Major shrine: St. Emmeram's Abbey, Regensburg, Germany
- Feast: 22 September
- Attributes: carrying a ladder
- Patronage: Regensburg and Bavaria

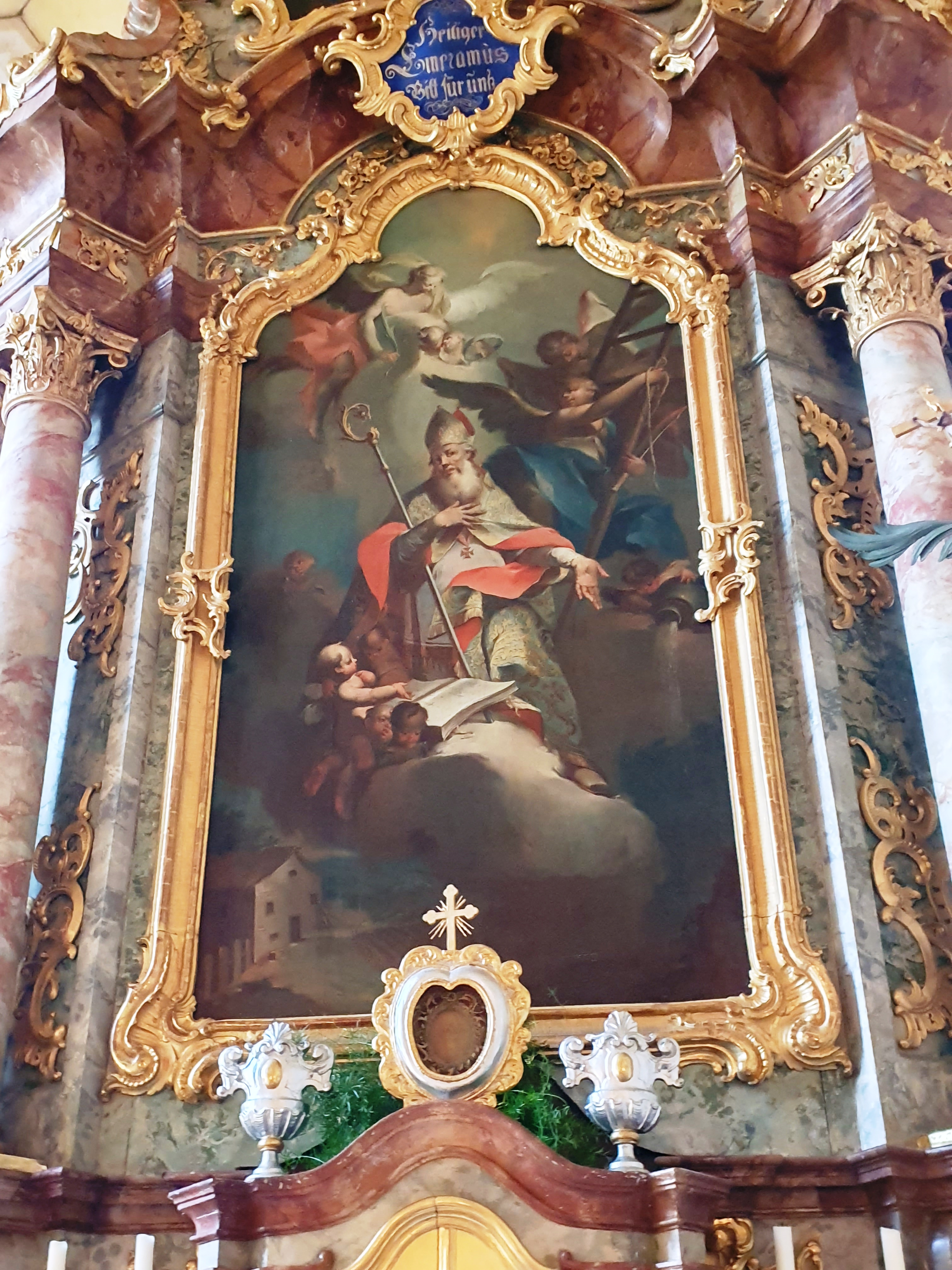
High altarpiece depicting St. Emmeram, painted in 1774 by Franz Xaver König

Saint Emmeram of Regensburg (also Emeram(m)us, Emmeran, Emmerano, Emeran, Heimrammi, Haimeran, or Heimeran) was a Christian bishop and a martyr born in Poitiers, Aquitaine. Having heard of idolatry in Bavaria, Emmeram travelled to Ratisbon (Regensburg) some time after the year 649 to the court of Theodo I, Duke of Bavaria. He supposedly travelled up the Loire, crossed through the Black Forest and then followed the Danube to Regensburg. Theodo welcomed Emmeram to his court, where he laboured for three years carrying out missionary work. During this time, he gained a reputation as a pious man. He died circa 652 and is buried in St. Emmeram's in Regensburg, Germany. His feast day in the Catholic Calendar of saints is September 22.

== Life ==
Arbeo of Freising wrote a biography of Emmeram in 750, the Vita Sancti Emmerami, about 100 years after the saint's death. The literature tells the story of Emmeram, born to a noble family in Aquitaine. According to Alban Butler and others, he became Bishop of Poitiers, although this cannot be verified. There is speculation that he held the office briefly between the death of Dido and the accession of Ansoaldus.

Having heard of idolatry in Bavaria, he decided to travel to Ratisbon (Regensburg) some time after the year 649 to the court of Agilofing, Theodo I, Duke of Bavaria. He supposedly travelled up the Loire, crossed through the Black Forest and then followed the Danube to Regensburg. Theodo welcomed Emmeram to his court, where he laboured for three years carrying out missionary work. During this time, he gained a reputation as a pious man. He founded the monastery that later bore his name.

He then went on a pilgrimage to Rome, but after a five days' journey, at a place now called Kleinhelfendorf, south of Munich, he was set upon by the Duke's son Lantpert of Bavaria, who tortured him cruelly. He died shortly afterwards at Aschheim, about fifteen miles distant. The cause of this attack and the circumstances attending his death are not known.

== Legend ==
As the story goes, Uta (or Ota), the daughter of the duke, confided to Emmeram that she was expecting a child out of wedlock. According to Arbeo, the father was one Sigipaldus from her father's own court. Moved with compassion, Emmeram advised her to name himself, whom everyone respected, as the father hoping to mitigate some of her shame. Shortly thereafter, the legend goes, Emmeram abruptly went on a pilgrimage to Rome. At this point, Uta named Emmeram as the father.

When Duke Theodo and his son Lantpert learned of Uta's pregnancy, Lantpert went after the bishop. Lantpert caught up with Emmeram in Helfendorf (now part of the Munich suburb of Aying) on the old Roman road between Salzburg and Augsburg on the Via Julia Augusta and greeted him as "bishop and brother-in-law". According to popular tradition, wanting to protect the real culprit, Emmeram did not defend himself, and received numerous wounds. Lantpert and his followers tied Emmeram to a ladder and proceeded to torture him; he was then beheaded.

His companions, Vitalis and Wolflete, found him still alive, lying in his own blood, and tried to bring him quickly back to Aschheim, where a walled church of Apostle Peter stood.

The improbability of the tale, the details of the saint's martyrdom, which are certainly untrue, and the fantastic account of the prodigies attending his death show that the writer, infected by the pious mania of his time, simply added to the facts imaginary details supposed to redound to the glory of the martyr.

== Veneration ==
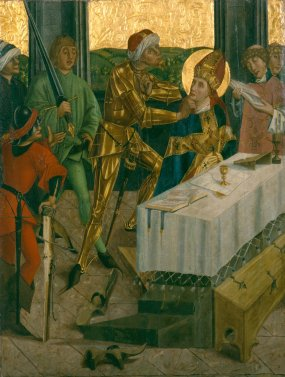
The Martyrdom of Saint Emmeram (Salzburg), from the Cathedral Treasury and Diocese Museum, Eichstätt

A text printed in Munich in 1743, Officium oder Tageszeiten des wunderthätigen Bayerischen Apostels und Blutzeugen Christi St. Emmerami, zu täglichen und andächtigen Gebrauch in allen Anliegen und Widerwärtigkeiten etc., states that the cart was accompanied by

men and women of two hundred persons with great sympathy and prayer. A half hour before reaching Aschheim, the saint called for a halt, as within the hour his reward of heaven was before him. Then it happened that they lifted him down from the cart and laid him upon a beautiful sward, where he gave up his ghost at once. ...The place where this happened remained fresh and green for all time until finally the alms of travelers (because all four roads come together there) and other good-hearted Christians had a church built, where even today many wonders still occur!

Arbeo of Freising depicted the place of his death as a "lovely, ever spring-green place, upon which a spring appeared and the local people later built a little church."

When the misunderstanding of Emmeram's relationship to Uta was revealed, he was entombed in Aschheim, whereupon legend states that it rained for forty days. Emmeram was exhumed and put upon a raft in the Isar. When the raft reached the Danube, it miraculously floated upstream to Regensburg, where Emmeram was interred in the church of St. George.(A somewhat similar tale is told of Lubentius of Dietkirchen.)

His remains were later moved to a church dedicated to the martyr. This church burned down in 1642. Emmeram's bones were found under the altar in 1645 and moved to St. Emmeram's Abbey. The church, now a basilica minor, houses his leg bones in a silver reliquary in the eastern portion under the altar.

At the spot Saint Emmeram died in the year 652, a small chapel was erected in the year 1842. The church of St. Lorenz in Oberföhring has a side altar dedicated to St. Emmeram. In the church of Saints Peter and Paul in Aschheim, a plaque memorializes the first grave of Emmeram with an inscription.

The day of his martyrdom is also his feast day, 22 September.

== Gallery ==
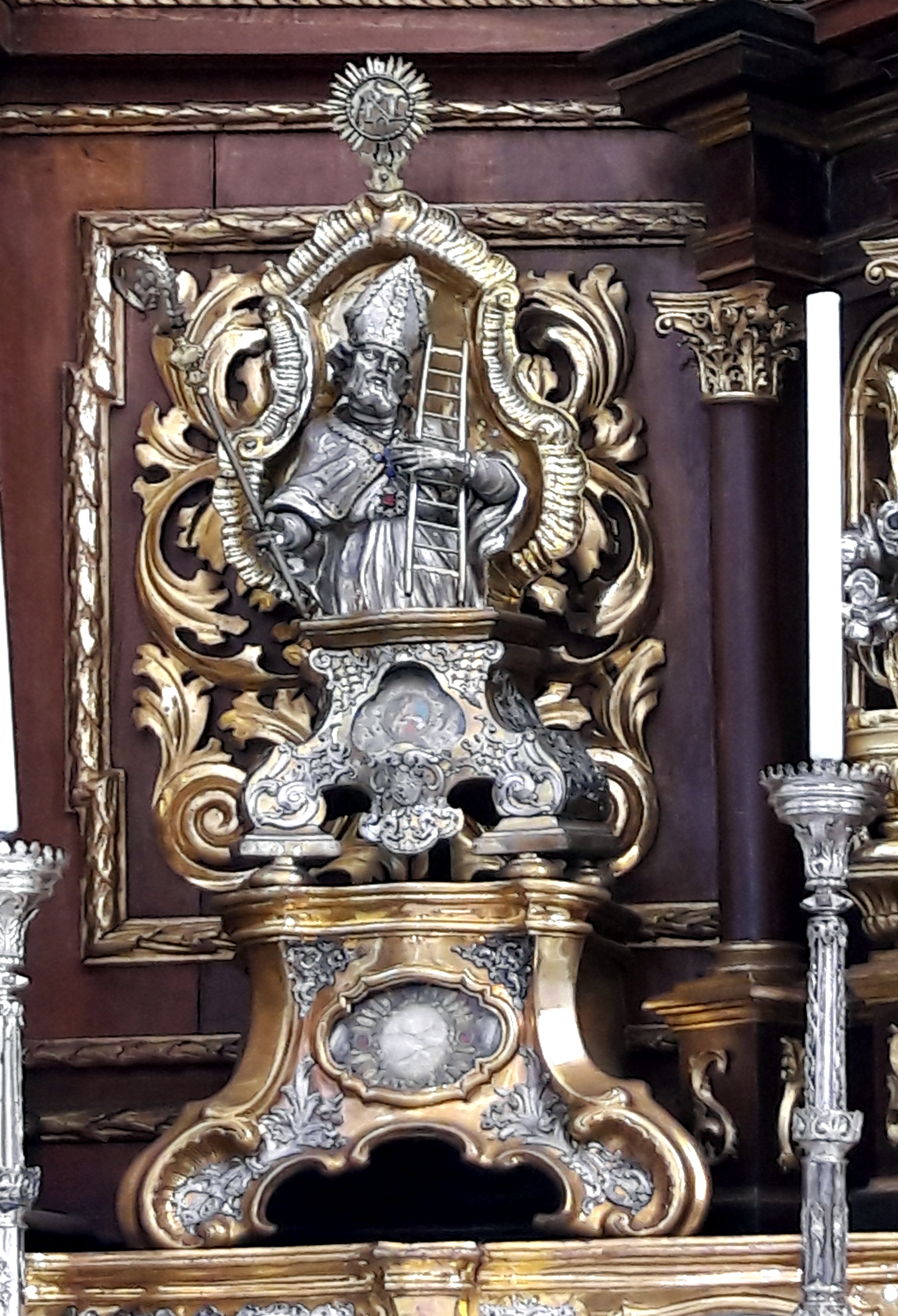
Silver reliquary of Saint Emmeram

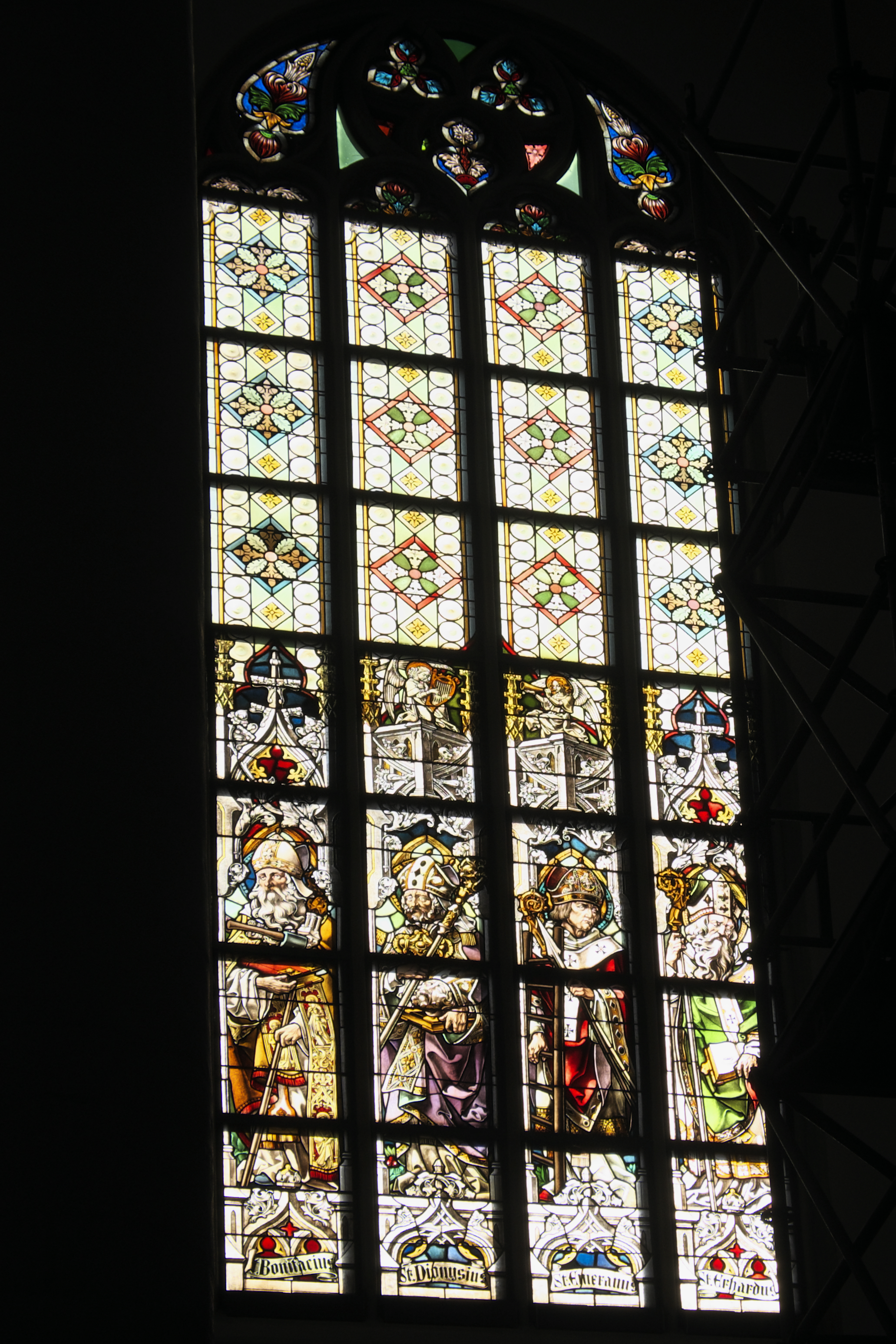
Stained glass depicting Saint Boniface, Saint Denis of Paris, Saint Emmeram and Saint Erhard

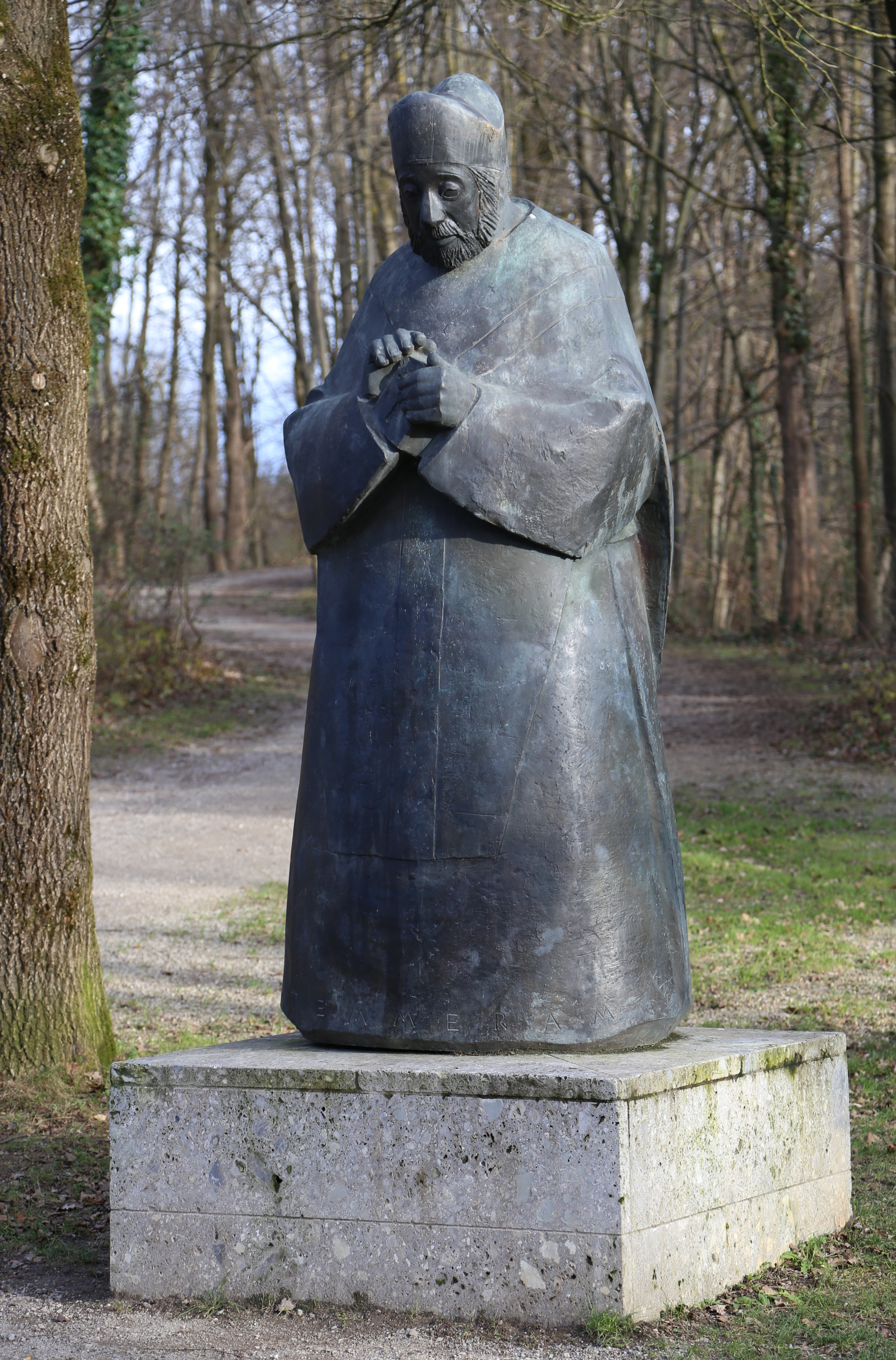
Statue of Emmeram

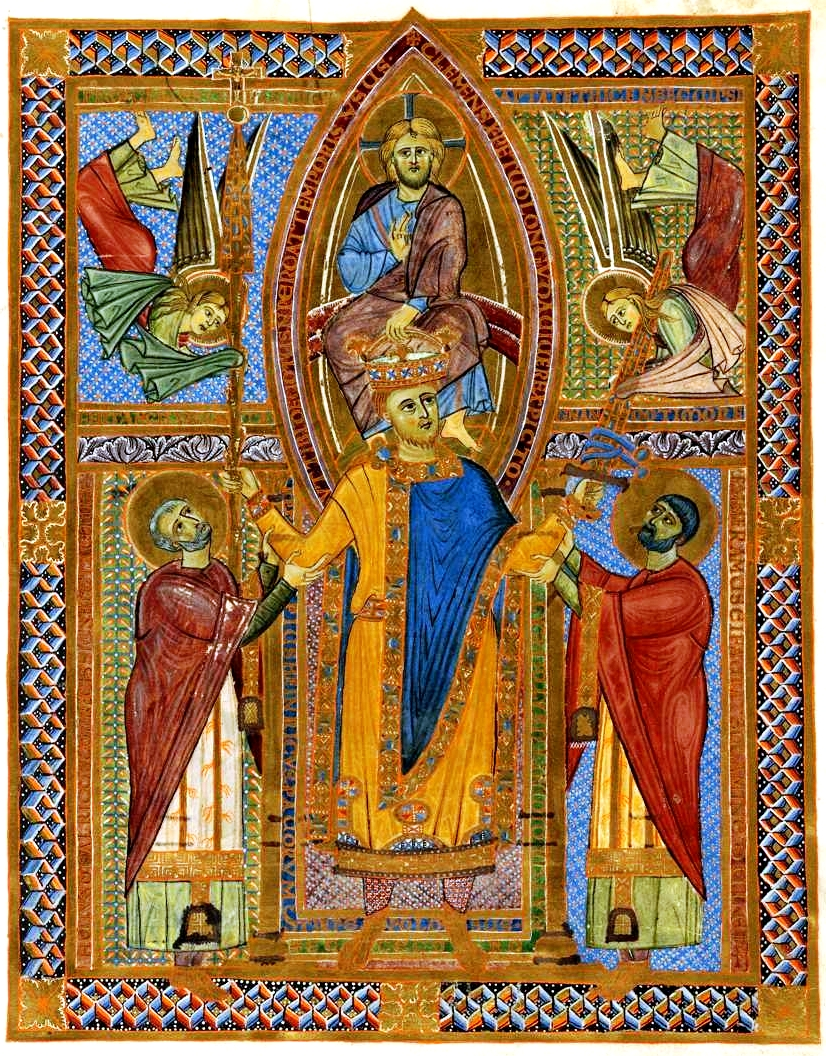
Sacramentary of Henry II depicting Saint Emmeram and Saint Ulrich of Augsburg flanking Emperor Henry II, who is being crowned by Christ

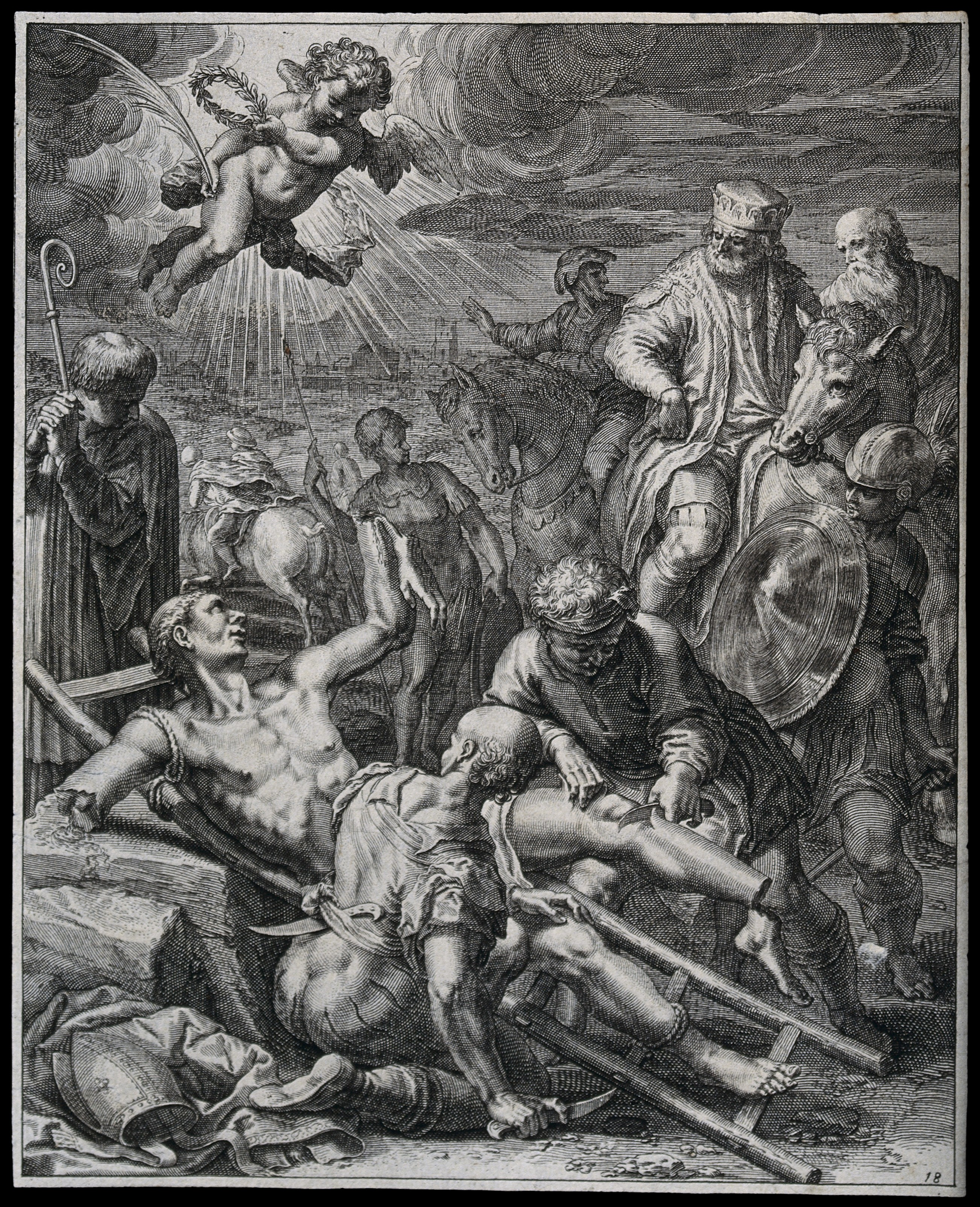
Martyrdom of Saint Emmeramus

== See also ==
- Saint Emmeram of Regensburg, patron saint archive

== Sources ==
- (in German) St. Emmeram from the Ökumenisches Heiligenlexikon
- (in German) Emmeram von Regensburg article on the German language Wikipedia
