= Constance of Hungary, Queen of Galicia =

Queen of Galicia

Constance of Hungary
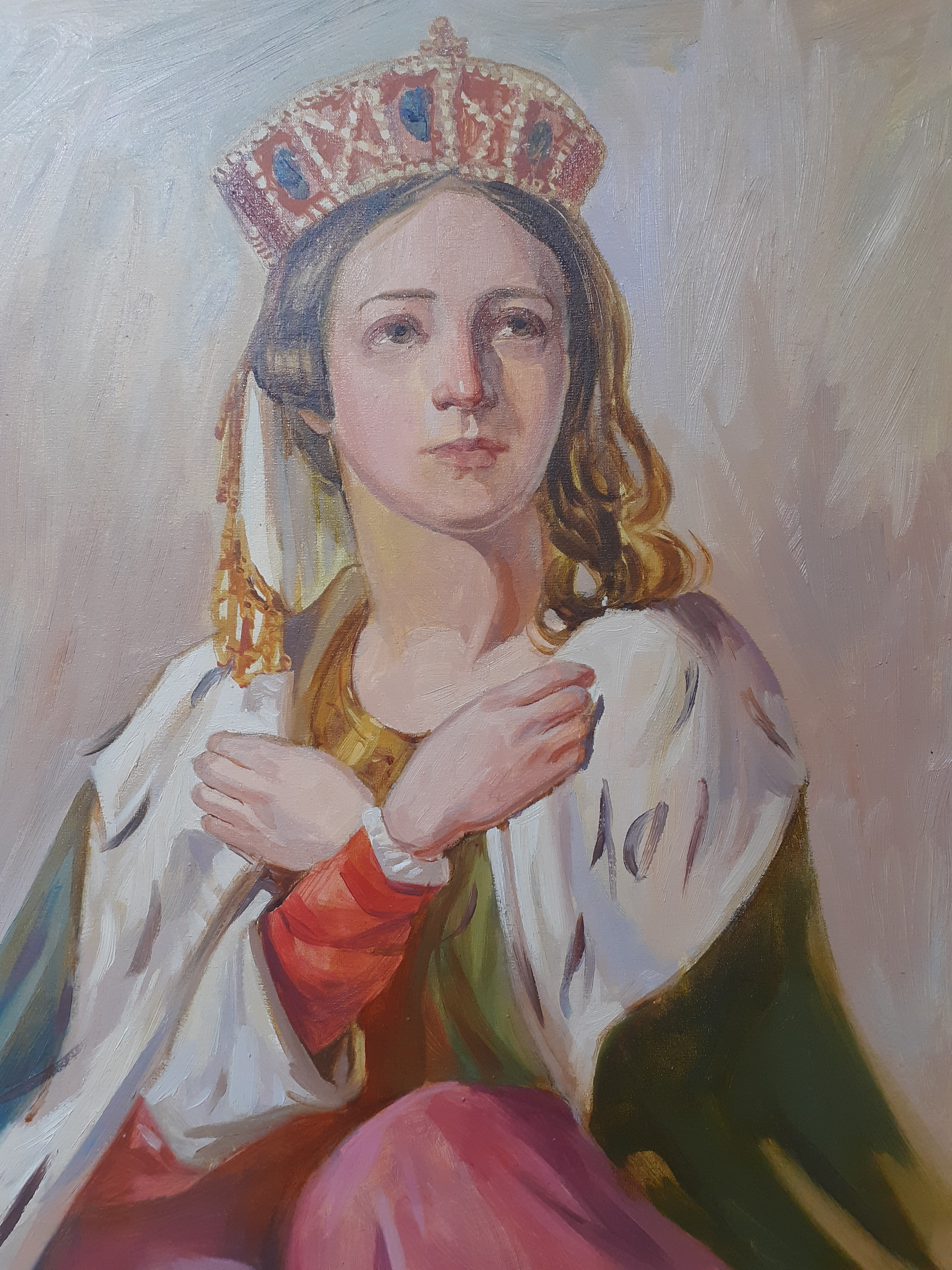
- Constance of Hungary, Uzhhorod castle
- Born: c. 1237
- Died: 1302
- Spouse: Leo I of Galicia
- Issue: Yuri I of Halych–Volhynia; Svyatoslava Lvovna of Halych–Volhynia; Anastasia Lvovna of Halych–Volhynia
- Father: Béla IV of Hungary
- Mother: Maria Laskarina

Constance of Hungary (Hungarian: Magyarországi Konstancia, Ukrainian: Констанція Угорська) (c. 1237–1302), was a Queen consort of Galicia and a Grand Princess of Kiev by marriage to Leo I of Galicia, Grand Prince of Kiev (r. 1271–1301).

She was the daughter of Béla IV of Hungary and Maria Laskarina.

== Family ==
King Bela IV had ten children. Constance's sisters were St. Kunegunda, married to the Kraków-Sandomir prince Boleslaw V the Chaste, Bl. Yolanda of Poland, married to Prince Bolesław the Pious of Kalisz, Anna of Hungary, married to the eternal rival of the Romanovychs for the Galician throne, Ban of Machva and Slavonia Rostislav Mikhailovich, Elizabeth of Hungary, married to Duke of Bavaria Henry XIII Wittelsbach, St. Margaret of Hungary, who lived a religious life since her birth. Her brother was the king Stephen V of Hungary.

Through the children of her sister Anna, the children of Constantia and Leo I were related to the main royal families of Central Europe. She is a descendant of the Grand Dukes of Kiev Vladimir II Monomakh and Yaroslav the Wise. Great-great-granddaughter of the Rus princess Euphrosyne of Kiev, daughter of the Grand Duke of Kiev Mstislav I the Great.

== Issue ==
They had three children:

- Yuri I of Halych–Volhynia (24 April 1252/1257 – 18 March 1308).
- Sviatoslava Lvovna of Halych–Volhynia (died 1302), a nun
- Anastasia Lvovna of Halych–Volhynia (died 12 March 1335), who married Siemowit of Dobrzyń.
