= Louis III, Duke of Bavaria =

Louis III. (February 9, 1269 – May 13, 1296) was duke of Lower Bavaria from 1290 until 1296 as co-regent with his brothers Otto III and Stephen I.

== Biography ==
Louis was born in Landshut, the son of Henry XIII, Duke of Bavaria and Elizabeth of Hungary. His maternal grandparents were Béla IV of Hungary and Maria Laskarina.

When Henry died in February 1290, his three sons ruled Lower Bavaria. They were Otto III, Louis III, and Stephen I.

Louis was known for his expensive holding of court which led to a tax increase. He was married to Isabelle, a daughter of Frederick III, Duke of Lorraine but died childless in 1296.
