= Formulary Book of Somogyvár =

15th-century Kingdom of Hungary codex

The Formulary Book of Somogyvár (Hungarian: Somogyvári formuláskönyv, Latin: Formularium Somogyváriense) is a codex or formulary from the Kingdom of Hungary, which was written mainly in the second half of the 15th century and was expanded in the 16th century. Beside legal texts, the manuscript contains three annals which date back to the time of the Árpádian era, a genealogy of the Hungarian monarchs from Béla III to Ladislaus of Naples, a rhythmic list of kings and a record of events regarding the Ottoman–Habsburg wars in Hungary. The codex is kept in the Teleki Library in Târgu-Mureş, Romania.

== Background ==
According to legal historian György Bónis, the 272-page document was written mainly between the 1460s and the end of the 1480s by an unidentified legal scholar of the royal court of King Matthias Corvinus. After his retirement, this scholar settled down in Somogyvár Abbey, an important place of authentication in the Kingdom of Hungary, where he copied and compiled his work with his own records from the royal court and his subsequent local legal practice. It is possible that this scholar is identical with jurist John Izsó de Kékcse, who acted as secular notary and lawyer of the abbey in 1488. Following that, the formulary book and its three annales were extended and completed by two another unidentified authors who also resided in Transdanubia. Lastly, a fourth person possessed the text, who recorded some events of the Ottoman wars in the 16th century, and acknowledged the legitimacy of John Zápolya during the civil war, while omitted to mention Ferdinand of Habsburg.

The document went Transylvania in some way. Historian Dániel Bácsatyai considered the Transylvanian Saxon pastor Michael Siegler possibly used the text when wrote his historical work Chronologia rerum Hungaricum in the 1560–1570s, since both authors know John Sigismund Zápolya's date of birth as an hour exactly, beside other similarities regarding the 16th century notes. Contrary to this, based on two attached copies of charters (issued in 1579 and c. 1592), Bónis argued that Hungarian prelate István Szuhay brought the codex to the Principality of Transylvania, when he was sent as envoy to the court of Stephen Bocskai in the 1590s. The fate of the formulary book is unknown for the upcoming two centuries. By 1794, lawyer József Batz de Zágon possessed the codex. He donated it to the library of the Rerformed Protestant High School in Marosvásárhely (legal predecessor of the Teleki Library) in 1811. György Bónis was the first historian, who analyzed the manuscript and determined the circumstances of its origin in 1957, but he did not describe the text itself. László Solymosi provided certified photocopy to the Diplomatic Photo Collection (DF) of the National Archives of Hungary. In the coming decades, only the footnote of Palatine Thomas' death (from the 16th-century fourth author) received attention. Adrien Quéret-Podesta was the first scholar, who analyzed the texts of the three annals in her 2009 study. Dániel Bácsatyai published and translated the texts concerning history – annals, genealogy, rhythmic list of kings and the 16th-century records – of the formulary book into Hungarian in 2019.

== Content ==
=== Legal texts ===
The codex contains altogether 486 sections (copies of 446 charters, 3 clauses, a law text, 10 historical records and 24 notes and 2 additional charters from the 16th century). In terms of scope, two-fifths of the work consists of the publication of royal diplomas between the pages 119 verso and 226 verso (no. 223–374 formulas). Another sections contain charters from both the royal chancellery and the places of authentication: from 1 recto to 119 recto (no. 1–222 formulas), and from 227 recto to 272 verso (no. 375–456), which covers three-fifths of the scope of the formulary book. The collection of charters does not follow a chronological order, the author copied all newly added diplomas to the next blank page. Based on the dates, György Bónis considered the first original author compiled the vast majority of his work in the years between 1480 and 1486, just before the passing of the so-called Decretum maius, when Matthias Corvinus ordered to replace many previous contradictory decrees with a systematic law-code. Bónis argued the formulary book is a valuable resource for presenting pre-Tripartitum legal life in Hungary, regarding private law, criminal law and litigation.

Bónis, after examining the content and form elements, defined the chapters of the formulary book as follows:

Page number	Document number	Content
1 recto – 117 verso	1–221	First section of documents from places of authentication (newer part), collected from mid-1470s to early 1480s
118 recto – 119 recto	222	Fees and daily allowances of the notaries
119 verso – 226 verso	223–374	Collection of royal charters (older part), collected in 1460–1470s
227 recto – 249 verso	375–417	Continuation of documents from places of authentication (newer part) with legal relatio
249 verso – 250 verso	418–419	Two attached copies of late 16th-century charters (István Fejérkövy, István Szuhay)
251 recto – 257 verso	420–427	Additional relatio and fassio from the 1480s (newer part)
258 recto – 267 verso	428–437	Historical records (see below)
268 recto – 272 verso	438–456	Additional relatio and fassio from the end of the 1480s, complementing the newer part

The author collected the documents to educate students and novice professionals, he also provided the texts with a number of useful remarks, similarly to the 14th-century Ars Notarialis. The author tried to gather the entire material of a single lawsuit, thus, the apprentice was able to trace all documents at all stages of the proceedings in a single case (for instance, investigation stage, requests for postponement, sentencing after a long absence despite the summons and applications for retrial). The author presents cases useful from the point of view of jurisprudence, which appear as many ad hoc possibilities as possible (e.g. postponement of litigation due to the litigant's minority or participation in a military campaign, out-of-court settlement). For the primary purpose of the case law illustration, the author frequently modified in the texts of the original diploma, the identity of the persons concerned (often deleted or changed). Multiple grammatical errors can be found in texts as a result of multiple copying. György Bónis emphasized the lack of logical organization and consistency of the texts too. Regarding the newer section, which contains documents from the places of authentication, represents less instructor intent. Instead of education, law practice mattered after his retirement to the Somogyvár Abbey, so he collected and compiled a sample library for himself. Here can be found some system organizing principles: lawyer advocates, last wills and testaments, pledges, petitions and omissions are found in roughly a subchapter.

=== Historical texts ===
Of the 272 pages, 10 pages – between 258 recto and 267 verso – are related to historical and genealogical narratives, while the vast majority of the manuscript contains legal aids (for instance, a guide to recognizing non-authentic charters), texts and copies of authentic diplomas.

==== First annales ====
The first annales (called as "Christian Annals" by Quéret-Podesta), are between 260 recto and the top of the 262 recto (altogether five pages). Its first section contains Biblical events from the creation of the world (possibly based on Bede's chronica maiora) to the Acts of the Apostles and the subsequent history of the Roman Catholic Church (based on Regino of Prüm's Chronicon), thus placing Hungarian history in a universal context. The Biblical history contains 11 notes (5 are from Old Testament, 6 are from New Testament) while the history of the Catholic Church and early medieval Europe (until the reign of Charlemagne) are made of 17 notes (altogether 28 notes). Hungarian events last from 993 (Stephen I's ascension to the Hungarian throne, which, in fact, occurred in 997) to 1291 (Andrew III's campaign against the Duchy of Austria). In the mid-16th century, the first annales were supplemented by a single footnote from the fourth author – the death and burial of Palatine Thomas in 1186.

Short notes of the events of the 11th century – mostly deal with Hungarian saints – are related to the Annales Posonienses in their core material, according to Bácsatyai. The text does not refer to kings Stephen I and Ladislaus I as "saints", when it mentions their coronation and death, which testifies to the early origin of the annales. The annales accuse the "Hungarians" of killing Bishop Gerard of Csanád, thus, the original text could have been written in an ecclesial community where foreign priests lived. Only two notes narrate events from the 12th century: Stephen II's invasion of Dalmatia (1124) and the canonization of Ladislaus I ("1113", in fact 1192). Two-third part of the Hungarian-related notes depict events from the 13th century. Dániel Bácsatyai considered that this section is the most valuable part of the entire formulary book. The text provides detailed genealogical data of Béla IV and his family. It uniquely gives the exact dates of the death of Queen Maria Laskarina (23 July 1270) and Béla, Duke of Slavonia (11 June 1269), while in the case of the king it gives a day's earlier mortality – Friday, 2 May 1270, which was also confirmed by the necrologium of the Oberalteich Abbey. Bácsatyai claimed the Hungarian chronicles put the date of his death to 3 May (also "Friday", which is, however, wrong) in retrospect, because of the feast of the Finding of the Holy Cross. A note also contains the date of the death of Francis of Assisi, as a single non-Hungarian event in this period. Therefore, Bácsatyai argued that this section of the first annales was originally written in the church of the Franciscans in Esztergom, where Béla IV and his family were also buried, so the exact date of their death was known to the local friars. Historian Attila Zsoldos accepted this argument and, consequently, the reliability of the dates of death of the aforementioned royalties.

Based on this, Bácsatyai considered the other notes of 13th century events as reliable too, which, however, differ from the scientific position. For instance, the first annales state that Béla IV was born in 1209, during a lunar eclipse. There is a scholar consensus that the monarch was born in 1206, because, upon King Andrew II's initiative, Pope Innocent III had already appealed to the Hungarian prelates and barons on 7 June to swear an oath of loyalty to the King's future son. According to the pope's letter, this unnamed son was born by 29 November 1206. Bácsatyai claimed this son was an unidentified older brother of Béla, who died in childhood. According to him, Béla was born either 1208 or 1209, when there were complete lunar eclipses in the territory of Hungary. In response, Zsoldos pointed out that Béla and his wife Maria married around 1220 and had already reached the age of majority by 1223, when King Andrew II persuaded Béla to separate from his wife, according to a letter of Pope Honorius III. There is also academic consensus – albeit it based only on tradition (Mór Wertner) and not primary source – that Béla's younger brother, Coloman of Galicia was indeed born in 1208, thus Bácsatyai's interpretation about a possible another unnamed Hungarian prince (born in 1206) is a fringe theory. The first annales narrate the civil war between Béla IV and his son Duke Stephen in a short sentence under the year 1267. Bácsatyai accepted this date, despite Hungarian historiography uniformly place the events from late 1264 to early 1265, since the seminal monograph of Gyula Pauler (A magyar nemzet története az Árpádházi királyok alatt, Vol. 1–2). Later, Bácsatyai also wrote a study for journal Századok (2020), in which he sought to support the correctness of the year 1267 with foreign chronicles (for instance, the appendix of Jans der Enikel's Weltchronik) and set up a new chronology of the events, practically return to the standpoint of the pre-Pauler historiography. Zsoldos, who had previously written the history of the civil war in 2007, contested his effort and argued the narrations of certain royal charters – which make Bácsatyai's proposal unsustainable – are more reliable sources than foreign (mainly Austrian) chronicles, which contain many elements of fiction and deal only tangentially with the Hungarian civil war. The annales also call Duke Stephen's Cuman father-in-law as "Semperchan". It is possible he is identical with Seyhan (Zayhan), whom Béla IV refers to his "kinsman" in 1255. The first annales state that Andrew III was crowned king on 6 August 1290, Sunday, the feast day of Pope Sixtus II. Bácsatyai accepted the reliability of the text, while the academic standpoint traditionally set the date to 23 July based on references in the Illuminated Chronicle and the Steirische Reimchronik, which, however, are not free from difficulties of interpretation. Bácsatyai argued that Andrea Dandolo's chronicle confirmed this data, according to which the coronation occurred during the feast of Saint Dominic (4 August). The historian considered the Venetian chronicle misinterpreted the information and the ceremony took place on the anniversary of the death of Dominic (6 August). Bácsatyai also analyzed the charters of Andrew III, examining the dates around which there is a change in the number of years of the king's reign, which confirm the correctness of the date in the annales (6 August). Bácsatyai also emphasized that the text notes that Andrew was "jointly and unanimously elected king by the Hungarians", which would have been an inconceivable formula in the later 14th-century chronicle composition.

==== Second annales ====
The second annales (called as "Hunnic Annals" by Quéret-Podesta), are between lower four-fifths of 262 recto and upper two-thirds of 263 verso (altogether four pages). The annales narrate events from Hunnic, Avar and Hungarian history, identifying the three people as a single Hungarian nation. Regarding the Huns, the work contains notes from the period between 337 (the Goths was expelled to the Roman Empire by the Huns, which marked the beginning of the Migration Period, in fact occurred in 376) and 405 (in fact 451, Attila's marching into Aurelianum). Regarding the Avars, the annales narrate the events between 503 (in fact 562, their failed attack on Austrasia) and 612 (the text kneads several events together, some of them already applies to the Hungarian invasions of Europe). From the Hungarian history, the annales refer to events from the period between 910 (the collection of several clashes of the Hungarian invasions from various years) and 1222 (the settlement of the Dominicans in Hungary). According to the analysis of Quéret-Podesta, the Hungarian section of the second annals contains 3 notes regarding the 10th century, 14 notes from the 11th century, 8 notes from the 12th century and finally 5 notes regarding the 13th century.

The original author of the second annales also utilized information from Regino of Prüm's Chronicon, but instead of the early history of Christianity – as the author of the first annals acted –, he focused on the barbaric past (the history of the Hunnic and Avar people). For the outline of the history of the Huns, the author also used Bene's chronica maiora as a source and – based on the text, for instance the annales correctly refer to Attila's brother as Bleda instead of "Buda" – the corpus of text was definitely written before Simon of Kéza's Gesta Hunnorum et Hungarorum (early 1280s). After philological research, Dániel Bácsatyai emphasized the second annales utilized the continuation of the chronicle of Regino (edited by Adalbert of Magdeburg) independently of the well-known Hungarian chronicles, Anonymus' Gesta Hungarorum, Simon of Kéza's Gesta Hunnorum et Hungarorum and the 14th-century chronicle composition (e.g. the Illuminated Chronicle). According to Bácsatyai, the second annales are more directly related to the Chronicon: the work utilized an extract from Regino's work, which was also used by a hypothetical gesta (or annales) about the early Hungarian history (the invasions to Europe). This gesta became a primary source for both Anonymus and the 14th-century chronicle composition for the events in the 10th century, independently from each other. Bácsatyai argued the second annales – as the earliest example – proves that the question of Hunnic–Hungarian identity was already present in earlier Hungarian historiography, before the age of Anonymus.

Regarding the section of the Hungarian history, notes until the 1160s are closely related to the text of the Annales Posonienses, but the second annales gave the years much more accurately (up to a year or two differences). The work contains much less unique information than the first annals. Its narrative, however, differs significantly at several points from other chronicles, for instance the Illuminated Chronicle; the late medieval chronicles, which mostly used texts written under kings descended from Álmos – a claimant to the Hungarian throne –, preserved an unfavorable image of King Coloman and his rule. The second annales state that after the death of Ladislaus I in 1095, Coloman returned home "peacefully" from Poland and began to rule jointly with his younger brother Álmos. The second annales are also unique in the statement that Béla I obtained the Hungarian throne with a "violent hand" against his brother Andrew I in 1060; the surviving chronicles were all written during the time of the descendants of Béla I, where such a formulation of events is understandably not found. Géza I was called as "Magnus" in those parts, when the subsequent monarch was still a duke, in accordance with the inscriptions on the coins issued by Duke Géza, which well reflects the author's awareness (later chronicles, including the Illuminated Chronicle, erroneously claim the king receive the epithet "Great" or "Magnus" because of his monarchical greatness after his death). One of the events in 13th century history also deserves attention: under the year 1205, there is a truncated, unfinished sentence, according to which the young Ladislaus III "was [...] violently from Esztergom" and subsequently his uncle Andrew II was crowned king. It is known that the child monarch died in exile, after his mother, Constance of Aragon, fled to Austria, taking Ladislaus with her. The annales also mentioned the brief reigns of the anti-kings Ladislaus II and Stephen IV (the rivals of their nephew Stephen III). According to Bácsatyai, there are philological parallels between the second annales and Alberic of Trois-Fontaines's chronicle regarding the list of Hungarian monarchs.

==== Third annales ====
The third annales (called as "Hungarian Annals" by Quéret-Podesta), are between 265 verso and 266 verso (altogether three pages). The earliest text of the annals – copied by the original first author – contains elements only from the Hungarian history, lasted from 1001 (the coronation of Stephen I) to 1464 (the coronation of Matthias Corvinus). The subsequent owners of the formulary book – three different handwriting can be distinguished – continued the text of the third annales. The second author preserved events from the year 1490 (the death of Matthias, the coronation of Vladislaus II and the first phase of the War of the Hungarian Succession). The third author contributed to the annales with a single note: the coronation of queen consort Anne of Foix-Candale in 1502. With the most entries, the owner of the fourth handwriting added the text: the events from this section last from 1516 (the death of Vladislaus II) to 1540 (the death of John Zápolya). According to Quéret-Podesta, 14 notes deal with events from the 11th century, 7 with the 12th century, 14 with the 13th century, only 3 with the 14th century and 9 notes with the 15th century, written by the original author. The three other authors expanded the text with 2 notes from the 15th century (second author) and 5 notes from the 16th century (1 by the third and 4 by the fourth author).

The text of the annales contains mostly genealogical data of the Hungarian monarchs (except a large earthquake in the year 1092). Similarly to the first and second annals, the third annales are closely related to the Annales Posonienses. Thus it is plausible that all four known annals (Annales Posonienses and the three annals of the Formulary Book of Somogyvár) had a common source regarding the events of the 11th and 12th centuries, an annales now lost. It is the only annales of the formulary book, which use Arabic numerals (following the year 1048). The third annales have no unique information.

==== Miscellaneous records ====
A biographical and genealogical list of the Hungarian kings – written by the first original author – can be found in two separate pages; the first part is on the lower part of the page 263 verso, immediately after the end of the second annales. The section continues after a blank page, in 265 recto. The list contains biographical data from Béla III to Ladislaus V, but also includes Ladislaus of Naples (an unsuccessful claimant against Sigismund) and his sister Joanna II of Naples, the last monarch of the Capetian House of Anjou. The names of the monarchs were written in Blackletter (or Gothic) script. The author preserved the name of Andrew II as "Endre", the old Hungarian variant of his name. There are some errors in the lineage: for instance, the text incorrectly claims that Andrew III was the son of his immediate predecessor, Ladislaus IV. On the last page of historical notes (267 recto), different notes can be found rejecting the authenticity of certain royal charters issued by the Hungarian monarchs. Within this, there is also a rhythmic list of kings, lasted from Stephen I (1000) to Sigismund (1437). This text contains an aid for clerks of the chancellery and places of authentication to easily navigate which kings' letters of donation are considered valid or invalid at the time the formulary book is compiled.

The fourth author of the formulary book recorded some events of the Ottoman wars in the 15th and 16th centuries, which reflected his historiographical awareness. He began the chronology on the page 265 recto, in the space left blank by the original author under his own work, the biographical data of the kings of Hungary. This section lasted from 1438 (the Ottoman occupation of Szászsebes, today Sebeș, Romania) to 1469 (in fact 1467, Matthias' unsuccessful invasion to Moldavia). The author continued the chronology in 264 verso. It narrates the events from 1479 (the Battle of Breadfield) to 1567 (in fact 1566, the Siege of Szigetvár and the death of Suleiman the Magnificent).

== Sources ==
- Bácsatyai, Dániel (2019). A Somogyvári formuláskönyv évkönyvei [The Annals of the Formulary Book of Somogyvár] (in Hungarian). Városi Levéltár és Kutatóintézet. ISBN 978-963-8406-21-7.
- Bónis, György (1957). "A Somogyvári formuláskönyv [Formulary Book of Somogyvár]". In Takáts, Lajos (ed.). Emlékkönyv Kelemen Lajos születésének nyolcvanadik évfordulójára (in Hungarian). Tudományos Könyvkiadó. pp. 117–133.
- Quéret-Podesta, Adrien (2009). "The Annals of the Formulary Book of Somogyvár". In Bárány, Attila; Györkös, Attila (eds.). Matthias and his legacy: Cultural and Political Encounters between East and West. University of Debrecen. pp. 187–193. ISBN 978-963-473-276-1.
- Zsoldos, Attila (2020). "Néhány kritikai megjegyzés az 1264–1265. évi belháború újrakeltezésének kísérletéhez [Some Critical Remarks on the Attempt to Re-date the 1264–1265 Civil War]". Századok (in Hungarian). 154 (6). Magyar Történelmi Társulat: 1331–1344. ISSN 0039-8098.
