= Otto III of Bavaria =

King of Hungary and Croatia from 1305 to 1307

Otto I (III)
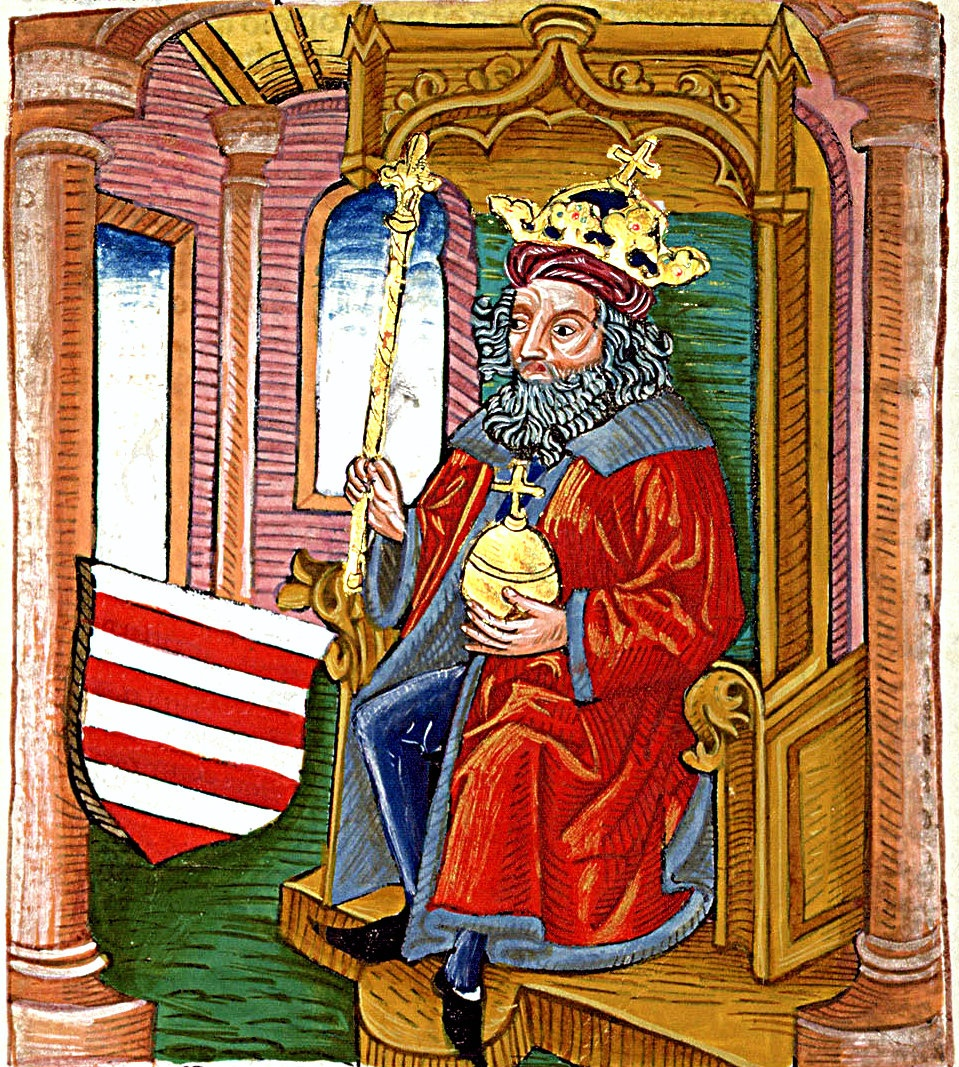

King of Hungary and Croatia Contested by Charles I
- Reign: 6 December 1305 - June 1307
- Coronation: 6 December 1305, Székesfehérvár
- Predecessor: Wenceslaus
- Successor: Charles I

Duke of Lower Bavaria
- Reign: 3 February 1290 – 9 November 1312
- Predecessor: Henry XIII
- Successor: Henry XV
- Born: 11 February 1261; Burghausen
- Died: 9 November 1312 (aged 51); Landshut
- Burial: Kloster Seligenthal, Landshut
- Spouse: Catherine of Habsburg; Agnes of Glogau
- Issue among others...: Henry XV, Duke of Bavaria
- House: Wittelsbach
- Father: Henry XIII, Duke of Bavaria
- Mother: Elizabeth of Hungary
- Religion: Roman Catholicism

Otto III (11 February 1261 – 9 November 1312), a member of the Wittelsbach dynasty, was the Duke of Lower Bavaria from 1290 to 1312 and the King of Hungary and Croatia between 1305 and 1307. His reign in Hungary was disputed by Charles Robert of the Angevin dynasty.

== Biography ==
Otto was born in Burghausen, the son of Henry XIII, Duke of Bavaria, and Elizabeth of Hungary. He succeeded his father in 1290 as duke of Lower Bavaria, together with his younger brothers, Louis III and Stephen I. Otto was in opposition to Habsburg and tried to regain Styria which Bavaria had lost in 1180. He supported Adolf, King of Germany against Habsburg and fought on his side in the Battle of Göllheim. The Hungarian crown was offered to Otto, a grandson of Béla IV of Hungary, in 1301 but he did not accept before 1305.

In August 1305, his opponent, Wenceslaus III of Bohemia, who had inherited Bohemia from his father, renounced his claim to Hungary on behalf of Otto III. Since the Habsburg Albert I of Germany was blocking the way through Austria, Otto disguised himself as a merchant, and reached Buda in November 1305.

Otto was then crowned with the Holy Crown of Hungary in Székesfehérvár by Benedict Rád, Bishop of Veszprém and Anthony, Bishop of Csanád on 6 December 1305. However, he was not able to strengthen his rule. In the course of 1306, Otto's second opponent Charles of Anjou occupied Esztergom, Szepes Castle, Zólyom and some other fortresses in the northern parts of the kingdom, and in the next year he also occupied Buda. In June 1307, Duke Otto III visited the powerful Voivode of Transylvania, Ladislaus Kán, but the latter imprisoned him. On 10 October 1307, the magnates presented at the assembly in Rákos proclaimed Charles king, but the most powerful aristocrats (Matthew III Csák, Amadé Aba and Ladislaus Kán) ignored him as well. At the end of the year, Ladislaus Kán set Otto free who then left the country, but the Voivode of Transylvania still refused to hand over the Holy Crown of Hungary to Charles, whose legitimacy could be questioned without the coronation with the Holy Crown.

Otto abdicated the Hungarian throne in 1308. Otto's involvement in Austrian and Hungarian affairs weakened his position in Bavaria and finally led to failure due to financial problems. In Hungarian historiography he is noted as an anti-king during the interregnum of 1301–1310.

During his presence in Hungary 1305–1308 Lower Bavaria was ruled by his brother Stephen I. In 1310 a new war against the Habsburgs devastated Burghausen. Otto died in 1312 and was succeeded in Lower Bavaria by his son Henry XV, who shared power with his cousins, Henry XIV and Otto IV, both sons of Stephen I. John I, a son of Henry XIV, was the last duke of Lower Bavaria before Louis IV, Holy Roman Emperor inherited the country and reunited the duchy in 1340.

== Marriages and children ==
In January 1279, Otto married Catherine, a daughter of Rudolf I of Germany and Gertrude of Hohenberg. Their twins, Henry and Rudolph, were born in 1280 and died the same year.

Catherine died on 4 April 1282. Otto remained a widower for twenty-three years. On 18 May 1309, Otto married his second wife Agnes of Glogau. She was a daughter of Henry III, Duke of Silesia-Glogau, and Matilda of Brunswick-Lüneburg. They had two children:

- Agnes of Wittelsbach (1310–1360).
- Henry XV, Duke of Bavaria (28 August 1312 – 18 June 1333).

Otto died in Landshut.

== Ancestors ==
Ancestors of Otto III of Bavaria

16. Otto I, Duke of Bavaria
8. Louis I, Duke of Bavaria
17. Agnes of Loon
4. Otto II, Duke of Bavaria
18. Frederick, Duke of Bohemia
9. Ludmila of Bohemia
19. Elizabeth of Hungary
2. Henry XIII, Duke of Bavaria
20. Henry the Lion
10. Henry V, Count Palatine of the Rhine
21. Matilda of England
5. Agnes of the Palatinate
22. Conrad, Count Palatine of the Rhine
11. Agnes of Hohenstaufen
23. Irmingard of Henneberg
1. Otto III, Duke of Bavaria
24. Béla III of Hungary
12. Andrew II of Hungary
25. Agnes of Antioch
6. Béla IV of Hungary
26. Berthold IV, Duke of Merania
13. Gertrude of Merania
27. Agnes of Rochlitz
3. Elizabeth of Hungary
28. Manuel Laskaris
14. Theodore I Laskaris
29. Ioanna Karatzaina
7. Maria Laskarina
30. Alexios III Angelos
15. Anna Komnena Angelina
31. Euphrosyne Doukaina Kamatera

== Sources ==
- Earenfight, Theresa (2013). Queenship in Medieval Europe. Palgrave Macmillan.
- Engel, Pal (2001). The Realm of St Stephen: A History of Medieval Hungary, 895-1526. I.B. Tauris.
- Klaniczay, Gábor (2002). Holy Rulers and Blessed Princesses: Dynastic Cults in Medieval Central Europe. Translated by Palmai, Eva. Cambridge University Press.
- Radvan, Laurentiu (2010). At Europe's Borders: Medieval Towns in the Romanian Principalities. Translated by Cîrdei, Valentin. Brill.

Otto III of Bavaria House of Wittelsbach Born: 11 February 1261 Died: 9 November 1312
Regnal titles
Preceded by Henry XIII	Duke of Lower Bavaria; 1290–1312	Succeeded by Henry XV
Preceded by Wenceslaus	King of Hungary and Croatia; 1305–1307	Succeeded by Charles I
