= Elizabeth of Hungary, Duchess of Bavaria =

Daughter of the king of Hungary (1236–1271)

Elizabeth of Hungary
- Duchess of Lower Bavaria
- Tenure: 29 November 1253 – 24 October 1271
- Born: 1236; Kingdom of Hungary
- Died: 1271 (aged 34–35); Duchy of Lower Bavaria, Holy Roman Empire
- Spouse: Henry XIII, Duke of Bavaria
- House: Árpád dynasty (by birth); House of Wittelsbach (by marriage)
- Father: Béla IV, King of Hungary
- Mother: Maria Laskarina

Elizabeth of Hungary (Hungarian: Árpád-házi Erzsébet, German: Elisabeth von Ungarn, 1236 – 25 October 1271) was a medieval Hungarian noble lady from the Árpád dynasty as a daughter of Béla IV, King of Hungary. She became the duchess of Lower Bavaria as the wife of Henry XIII, Duke of Bavaria. She was the mother of Otto, King of Hungary.

== Life ==
Elizabeth was born around 1236 to Béla IV and his Greek wife, Queen Maria Laskarina as their fifth child. Born shortly after the canonisation of her aunt, Elizabeth of Hungary in May 1235, she was named after her. Around 1244, or as late as 1250, she was married to Henry of Bavaria, a younger son of the then-reigning duke of Bavaria and count palatine of the Rhine, Otto II, which was recorded in the Annales Altahenses. In 1253, her husband and her brother-in-law inherited Bavaria and the Palatinate from their father, dividing it between themselves. Henry ruled over Lower Bavaria. Elizabeth died on 24 October 1271 and was buried in Seligenthal Abbey. Her death was recorded in the abbey's necrology as well as in those of Tegernsee Abbey and Windberg Abbey, and in the Annales Altahenses, all naming her as ducissa Bawarie, 'duchess of Bavaria'.

== Issue ==
Between 1254 and 1271, Elizabeth had ten recorded children with her husband:

- Agnes I (January 1254 – 20 October 1315), joined the Cistercian nuns of Seligenthal Abbey; no issue.
- Agnes II (17 July 1255 – 10 May 1260), died in childhood, no issue.
- Agnes III (29 October 1256 – 16 November 1260), died in childhood, no issue.
- Elizabeth (23 April 1258 – 8 August 1314), joined the Cistercian nuns of Seligenthal Abbey; no issue.
- Otto III, Duke of Bavaria (11 February 1261 – 9 November 1312), inherited Lower Bavaria with his younger brothers in 1290 and claimed the throne of Hungary between 1305 and 1307. He married twice and had issue.
- Henry (23 February 1262 – 16 September 1280), died young, no issue.
- Sophie (circa 1264 – 4 February 1282), married Poppo VIII, Count of Henneberg.
- Catherine (9 June 1267 – 9 January 1310), married Frederick Tuta, Margrave of Meissen and had issue.
- Louis III, Duke of Bavaria (9 October 1269 – 9 October 1296), inherited Lower Bavaria with his brothers, married but had no issue.
- Stephen I, Duke of Bavaria (14 March 1271 – 10 December 1310), inherited Lower Bavaria with his elder brothers, married, and had issue.
