= Béla, Duke of Slavonia =

Béla
- Duke of Slavonia
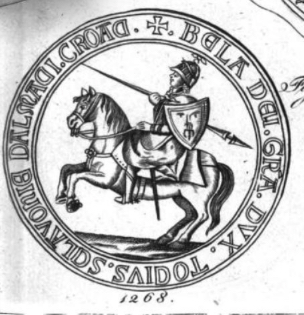
- Béla's seal (1268)
- Born: c. 1249
- Died: June/October 1269 (aged 19–20)
- Burial: Minorites' Church, Esztergom
- Spouse: Kunigunde of Ascania
- Dynasty: Árpád dynasty
- Father: Béla IV of Hungary
- Mother: Maria Laskarina

Béla (c. 1249 –1269) was the youngest and favorite child of King Béla IV of Hungary. His father appointed him Duke of Slavonia in 1260, but he only started to govern his duchy from 1268. He died childless.

== Early life ==
Béla was the youngest child and the second son of King Béla IV of Hungary. His mother was Maria Laskarina, daughter of Theodore I Laskaris, Emperor of Nicaea. The year of his birth is uncertain, but he was his parents' youngest child. Taking into account that his sister, Margaret was born in 1242, Mór Wertner, Gyula Kristó and other historians write that Béla was born around 1243. Béla himself stated in a charter of 1269 that "we has not turned twenty-five, we are about twenty", suggesting that he had actually been born around 1249.

King Béla's letter to Pope Innocent IV, which was written in about 1254, contains the first record of Béla's life. The letter refers to a plan of the child Béla's marriage with an unnamed niece of the Pope. However, the marriage never took place because of the death of Pope Innocent shortly thereafter. Béla's tutor was Andrew Hont-Pázmány in 1256. Berke Khan proposed an alliance to Béla IV in 1259 by offering to marry one of his daughters to a son of Béla (i.e. his namesake younger son, the only one who had not yet been married), but he refused the Khan's offer.

== Duke of Slavonia ==
His father appointed him Duke of Slavonia in 1260. In addition to Slavonia, Béla's duchy included Croatia and Dalmatia. These lands had been governed by Béla's elder brother, Stephen until 1257, when he was transferred to Transylvania. As the Duke of Slavonia was considered traditionally the heir apparent to the Hungarian throne since the second half of the 12th century, Stephen accused his father of planning to disinherit him in favor of his eleven-year-old younger brother, Béla, because of the emerging tensions between the monarch and his elder son. A brief civil war took place in the autumn of 1262, after which a ceasefire was concluded. In the Peace of Pressburg, the two divided the country along the Danube: the lands to the west of the river remained under the direct rule of Béla, and the government of the eastern territories was taken over by Stephen, the king-junior.

However, the relationship between father and son remained tense, and the peace was only temporary, the monarch gathered strength to retaliate. King Béla IV handed over the castles of Nyitra (Nitra, Slovakia), Pressburg (Bratislava, Slovakia), Moson and Sopron to Duke Béla. In addition, the king also attached the counties of Baranya, Somogy, Zala, Vas and Tolna to Béla's duchy. Both donation letters were confirmed by Pope Urban IV on 21 December 1263. According to a papal letter, the young Béla was also granted the castle of Vasvár and Valkó County sometime before 15 July 1264. The latter county belonged to Stephen's sphere of influence in accordance with the Peace of Pressburg, which was thus violated by Béla IV with this donation. Pope Urban IV instructed Philip Türje, Archbishop of Esztergom and Paul Balog, Bishop of Veszprém to defend Duke Béla's interests. The entire royal family, including Duke Stephen were present at the wedding of Duke Béla and Kunigunde of Ascania near Pressburg on 5 October 1264. According to historian Attila Zsoldos, Béla IV – having secured himself on several fronts – confronted with his elder son at the event, which made a large-scale civil war inevitable in Hungary. The clashes between the forces of Béla IV and Stephen throughout the kingdom lasted from December 1264 until the spring of 1265. Stephen gained a decisive victory over his father's army in the Battle of Isaszeg in March 1265. Their new peace treaty confirmed the 1262 division of Hungary. Stephen also acknowledged his younger brother Béla's authority over the Duchy of Slavonia and the aforementioned attached neighboring counties.

According to historian Jenő Szűcs, Béla IV and his two sons, Stephen and Béla together confirmed the liberties of the "royal servants", from then on known as noblemen, in 1267. In contrast, Attila Zsoldos considers, the king alone organized the meeting to Esztergom in September 1267, and was merely mobilization and preparation for a next war against Duke Stephen. Only Duke Béla attended the event, where – as Zsoldos claims – the mobilized royal servants were not enthusiastic about another internal war, instead they demanded the recognition of their rights and privileges from the monarch, and the name of the absent Stephen was included in the charter at their request. From 1260 to 1268, bans Roland Rátót, then Henry Kőszegi governed the province Slavonia on behalf of Béla during his minority. The duke took over the direct administration of the province sometime after 13 March 1268, subordinating Henry Kőszegi, who remained ban. Duke Béla granted the eponymous domain of Gara in Valkó County (now Gorjani in Croatia) to brothers John and Stephen Dorozsma, ancestors of the powerful Garai family in April 1269. He also made an agreement with the Knights Templar, handing over Dubica County in Lower Slavonia and its accessories (e.g. marturina) to the knights in late 1268 or early 1269.

According to the 15th-century Formulary Book of Somogyvár, Béla died on 11 June 1269, although his name appeared among the list of dignitaries in a charter issued in Split on 20 June, but this may also be possible due to the slow flow of information. Béla IV mentioned his son as dead on 3 October 1269. He was buried in the church of the Franciscans in Esztergom.

== Family ==
He was betrothed to Kunigunde of Ascania, daughter of Otto III, Margrave of Brandenburg, in 1261, after Béla IV and his long-time rival Ottokar II of Bohemia concluded a peace following the Battle of Kressenbrunn. Their wedding took place on 5 October 1264 near Pressburg, at the bank of the river Fischa. According to Veronika Rudolf, it is also conceivable that the agreement between Ottokar II and Béla IV concluded only after 1262, when the Bohemian king tried to secure his hinterland and support Béla IV against his rebellious son Stephen. The event was reported in detail by Ottokar aus der Gaal's Steirische Reimchronik ("Styrian Rhyming Chronicle") written in the early 14th century. This is the only known description of a court ceremony from the age of Árpáds in Hungary. Organized by King Ottokar II, several princes and magnates from the Holy Roman Empire attended the wedding and the subsequent feast, in addition to the Hungarian royal family (the royal couple, Duke Stephen and Duke Béla of Macsó) and several barons of the realm. The wedding was celebrated by three bishops, John of Prague, Bruno of Olomouc and Berthold of Bamberg. According to the narration of the chronicle with dubious authenticity, when a knight's tournament (buhurt) took place, the Hungarians misunderstood the situation and left the ceremony prematurely, including the newlywed husband Béla.

Around 1267, Kunigunde was pregnant, but the fate of the child, if was born alive at all, is unknown. After Béla's death, Kunigunde married to Waleran IV, Duke of Limburg in 1273. Ottokar entrusted Siegfried II of Westerburg to conduct the process. This marriage remained childless too. Kunigunde widowed for the second time in 1279. She died sometime after 1292.

== Sources ==
- Bácsatyai, Dániel (2019). A Somogyvári formuláskönyv évkönyvei [The Annals of the Formulary Book of Somogyvár] (in Hungarian). Városi Levéltár és Kutatóintézet. ISBN 978-963-8406-21-7.
- Bumke, Joachim (1991). Courtly Culture: Literature and Society in the High Middle Ages. Translated by Dunlop, Thomas. University of California Press. ISBN 9780520066342.
- Érszegi, Géza; Solymosi, László (1981). "Az Árpádok királysága, 1000–1301 [The Monarchy of the Árpáds, 1000–1301]". In Solymosi, László (ed.). Magyarország történeti kronológiája, I: a kezdetektől 1526-ig [Historical Chronology of Hungary, Volume I: From the Beginning to 1526] (in Hungarian). Akadémiai Kiadó. pp. 79–187. ISBN 963-05-2661-1.
- Fine, John V. A. (1994) [1987]. The Late Medieval Balkans: A Critical Survey from the Late Twelfth Century to the Ottoman Conquest. Ann Arbor, Michigan: University of Michigan Press. ISBN 978-0-472-10079-8.
- Kristó, Gyula; Makk, Ferenc (1996). Az Árpád-ház uralkodói [Rulers of the House of Árpád] (in Hungarian). I.P.C. Könyvek. ISBN 963-7930-97-3.
- Rudolf, Veronika (2023). Közép-Európa a hosszú 13. században [Central Europe in the Long 13th Century] (in Hungarian). Arpadiana XV., Research Centre for the Humanities. ISBN 978-963-416-406-7.
- Vizkelety, András (1993). "Béla hercegnek, IV. Béla király fiának menyegzője [The Wedding of Duke Béla, son of King Béla IV]". Irodalomtörténeti Közlemények (in Hungarian). 97 (5–6): 571–584. ISSN 0021-1486.
- Zsoldos, Attila (2007). Családi ügy: IV. Béla és István ifjabb király viszálya az 1260-as években [A family affair: The Conflict between Béla IV and King-junior Stephen in the 1260s] (in Hungarian). História, MTA Történettudományi Intézete. ISBN 978-963-9627-15-4.

Béla, Duke of Slavonia House of Árpád Born: c. 1249 Died: 11 June 1269
Regnal titles
| Vacant Title last held by Stephen | Duke of Slavonia; 1260–1269 | Vacant Title next held by Ladislaus |
