= Henry XIII of Bavaria =

13th-century Bavarian nobleman

Henry XIII
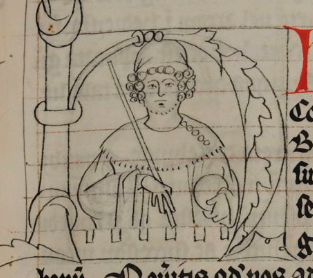
- Portrait from Liber Fundatorum Zwetlensis

Duke of Lower Bavaria
- Reign: 1253 – 1290
- Predecessor: Otto II
- Successor: Otto III; Louis III; Stephen I
- Born: 19 November 1235
- Died: 3 February 1290 (aged 54)
- Spouse: Elizabeth of Hungary
- Issue Detail: Otto III, Duke of Bavaria; Louis III, Duke of Bavaria; Stephen I, Duke of Bavaria
- House: Wittelsbach
- Father: Otto II, Duke of Bavaria
- Mother: Agnes of the Palatinate

Henry XIII (19 November 1235 – 3 February 1290), member of the Wittelsbach dynasty, was Duke of Lower Bavaria.

== Family ==
He was the younger son of Otto II and Agnes of Brunswick.

== Biography ==
In 1254, he succeeded his father together with his brother Louis II in Bavaria and the Palatinate. The brothers divided their land in 1255 against the law. Henry received Lower Bavaria and Louis Upper Bavaria and the Palatinate. It was the first of many divisions of the duchy. Henry resided in Landshut and, in 1255, the work for the main castle of Burghausen Castle was begun.

As the division of the duchy was against the law, it caused anger of the Bishops in Bavaria who allied with Ottokar II of Bohemia in 1257. In August 1257, Ottokar invaded Bavaria, but Henry and Louis managed to repulse the attack. It was one of the rare concerted and harmonious actions of both brothers who often argued. Henry was also later several times at war against the Prince-Archbishopric of Salzburg and the Prince-Bishopric of Passau. During the conflict of King Rudolph I of Germany with Ottokar II, Duke Henry repeatedly changed allegiance. Later, it was with his help that the Fürstenzell Abbey was founded in 1274.

During Duke Henry's reign, the Bavarian Peace Ordinances were put into place in his domains, stating, "Anyone out of doors at night without a lantern is violating the peace and is suspect of crime." The ordinances extend further for the city of Landshut that anyone carrying a sword or dagger by day or night was liable to heavy penalties.

Henry XIII was succeeded by his oldest son Otto III, who also became King of Hungary. Henry's branch died out in 1340 and was inherited by Louis' son Emperor Louis IV.

== Marriage and children ==
In 1250, Henry married Elizabeth of Hungary, a daughter of Béla IV of Hungary and Maria Laskarina. The couple were married for twenty-one years and had ten children:

- Agnes (January 1254 – 20 October 1315). Joined the Cistercian Monastery at Seligenthal as a nun.
- Agnes (17 July 1255 – 10 May 1260). She shared her name with her older sister.
- Agnes (29 October 1256 – 16 November 1260). She shared her name with her two older sisters.
- Elizabeth (23 April 1258 – 8 August 1314). Joined the Cistercian Monastery at Seligenthal as a nun.
- Otto III, Duke of Bavaria (11 February 1261 – 9 November 1312), married Catherine of Habsburg
- Henry (23 February 1262 – 16 September 1280).
- Sophie (c. 1264 – 4 February 1282). Married Poppo VIII, Count of Henneberg.
- Catherine (9 June 1267 – 9 January 1310). Married Frederick Tuta, Margrave of Meissen.
- Louis III, Duke of Bavaria (9 October 1269 – 9 October 1296).
- Stephen I, Duke of Bavaria (14 March 1271 – 10 December 1310).

== Sources ==
- Arnold, Benjamin (2004). Power & Property in Medieval Germany Economic and Social Change 900-1300. New York: Oxford University Press. ISBN 978-0-19-927221-1.
- Klaniczay, Gábor (2002). Holy Rulers and Blessed Princesses: Dynastic Cults in Medieval Central Europe. Translated by Palmai, Eva. Cambridge University Press.

Henry XIII of Bavaria House of Wittelsbach Born: 19 November 1235 Died: 3 February 1290
Regnal titles
Preceded by Otto II	Duke of Lower Bavaria; 1253–1290	Succeeded by Otto III with Ludwig III and Stephen I
