= Yolanda of Poland =

Hungarian abbess

Blessed Yolanda of Poland
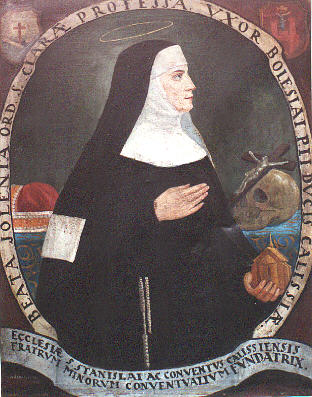
- 1923 fantasy depiction

Religious
- Born: 1235; Esztergom
- Died: 1298; Gniezno
- Venerated in: Catholic Church
- Beatified: 1827 (cultus confirmed)
- Feast: 11 and 12 June

Yolanda of Poland or Yolanda of Hungary, also Blessed Yolanda (Jolanta in Polish; Jolán in Hungarian; also known as Helen; 1235 – 11 June 1298) was the daughter of King Béla IV of Hungary and Maria Laskarina. She was the sister of Margaret of Hungary and Kinga of Poland (Cunegunda). One of her paternal aunts was the Franciscan Elizabeth of Hungary.

== Life ==
As a young girl, Yolanda was sent to Poland to be tutored under the supervision of her sister, Kinga, who was married to the Duke of Poland. There, she was encouraged to marry Bolesław the Pious, which she did in 1257. They had three daughters:

- Elisabeth of Kalisz (1263 – 28 September 1304); married Henry V, Duke of Legnica
- Jadwiga of Kalisz (1266 – 10 December 1339); married Władysław I the Elbow-high, King of Poland
- Anna of Kalisz (born 1278, date of death unknown); a nun in Gniezno.

During the time of her marriage, she was noted for her great services to the poor and needy of the country, as well as being a major benefactor of the monasteries, friaries and hospitals connected to them. Her husband gave her so much support in her charities that he earned the nickname "the Pious". She was widowed in 1279.

== Religious work ==
Following Boleslaus' death, Yolanda and Kinga, along with one of Yolanda's daughters, Anna, retired to the Poor Clare monastery that Kinga had founded in Sandez. Forced to relocate due to armed conflict in the region, Yolanda founded a new monastery in Gniezno. She was persuaded to become abbess of the community of nuns shortly before her death. She was believed to have been so devoted to Christianity that shortly before dying, Jesus Christ appeared to her to foretell her of her death.

== Veneration ==
She has been declared a candidate for sainthood. She was beatified by Pope Leo XII in 1827. Her sisters, Kinga and Margaret, have already been canonized.

== Sources ==
- Curta, Florin, ed. (2021). The Routledge Handbook of East Central and Eastern Europe in the Middle Ages. Routledge.
- Burkhardt, Julia (2019). "Friars and Princesses in Late Medieval Poland. Encounters, Interactions and Agency". In Jaspert, Nikolas; Just, Imke (eds.). Queens, Princesses and Mendicants: Close Relations in a European Perspective. LIT Verlag.
- Klaniczay, Gábor (2002). Holy Rulers and Blessed Princesses: Dynastic Cults in Medieval Central Europe. Translated by Palmai, Eva. Cambridge University Press.
- Roest, Bert (2013). Order and Disorder: The Poor Clares Between Foundation and Reform. Brill.
- Salagean, Tudor (2016). Transylvania in the Second Half of the Thirteenth Century: The Rise of the Congregational System. Brill.
