= Kinga of Poland =

Christian saint

Saint Kinga of Poland
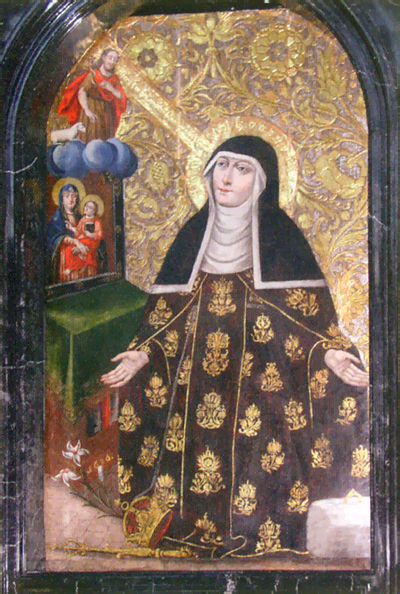
- Born: 5 March 1224; Esztergom, Kingdom of Hungary
- Died: 24 July 1292 (aged 68); Stary Sącz, Kingdom of Poland
- Venerated in: Catholic Church
- Beatified: 11 June 1690, Saint Peter's Basilica, Papal States by Pope Alexander VIII
- Canonized: 16 June 1999, Saint Peter's Square, Vatican City by Pope John Paul II
- Feast: 24 July
- Attributes: Depicted as an abbess; crown
- Patronage: Poland, Lithuania, Salt miners

Kinga of Poland or Kinga of Hungary, also Saint Kinga (also known as Cunegunda; Polish: Święta Kinga, Hungarian: Szent Kinga, Lithuanian: Šv. Kunigunda) (5 March 1224– 24 July 1292) was a Hungarian princess at birth and gained the title of Grand Duchess Of Poland, once the marriage pact between her and Boleslaw V ("the chaste") was completed. Kinga is a saint in the Catholic Church and patroness of Poland and Lithuania.

== Biography ==
Kinga was born in Esztergom, Kingdom of Hungary, the daughter of King Béla IV of Hungary and Maria Laskarina. She was a niece of Elizabeth of Hungary and great-niece of Hedwig of Andechs. Kinga's sisters were Margaret of Hungary and Jolenta of Poland. She married Bolesław V ("the Chaste"), and became duchess when her husband ascended the throne as High Duke of Poland. Despite the marriage, the devout couple took up a vow of chastity. Their marriage served as a point of pride for the Polish people; the couple's vow of chastity being viewed as a divine sacrifice for God's favor during a time of crisis in Poland and eastern Europe. Kinga was described by 15th century writer Jan Dlugosz as “a girl of fifteen” who was “considered unusually beautiful and virtuous”. The marriage was an alliance between Krakow and the Kingdom of Hungary to prepare for an upcoming Mongol threat to both regions.

Beginning in 1240, the Mongols conducted a series of raids into Poland and Hungary. On April 9, 1241, Mongol forces defeated Polish forces, causing Kinga and Boleslaw to flee to safety in Hungary. Earlier, in March 1241, the Mongols had sacked and burned the city of Krackow, Poland's chief seat of power at the time. Kinga is credited by multiple sources as being instrumental in keeping Polish faith and identity alive in the aftermath of the Mongol raids.

During her reign, Kinga got involved in charitable works such as visiting the poor and helping the lepers. When her husband died in 1279, she sold all her material possessions and gave the money to the poor."his widow, Kinga, had scarcely buried her husband, before she donned the habit of the Order of St. Clare, announcing that she had long yearned for this," author Jan Długosz wrote in his Annals. She did not wish to play any further part in Poland's governance, becoming a Poor Clare nun in the monastery at Sandec (Stary Sącz). She would spend the rest of her life in contemplative prayer, and did not allow anyone to refer to her past role as Grand Duchess of Poland. She died on 24 July, 1292, aged 68.

Alexander VIII beatified Kinga on 11 July 1690. In 1695, she was made chief patroness of Poland and Lithuania. The cause for her canonization was opened on 13 July 1741, and on 16 June 1999, she was canonized by Pope John Paul II.

== Legend ==
Legend has it that Kinga threw her engagement ring into the Aknaszlatina salt mine in what was then Hungary. The ring miraculously traveled along with salt deposits to Wieliczka, where it was rediscovered. On this spot the miners erected a statue of Saint Kinga, carved entirely from salt, which is 101 meters under the Earth's surface.

== St.Kinga Chapel ==
Located in the Wieliczka salt mine 331 feet or 101 meters below the surface sits a chapel dedicated to St.Kinga. Kinga is recognized as the patron Saint of salt miners and the chapel is completely carved out of salt.In the chapel in contains and depicts many religious figures and traditions. Along with a salt statue of Kinga there are more such as Pope John Paul, Saint Joseph, Saint Clement, and our lady of Lourdes.

== Sources ==
- Kristó, Gyula (2003). Háborúk és hadviselés az Árpádok korában [Wars and Tactics under the Árpáds] (in Hungarian). Szukits Könyvkiadó. ISBN 963-9441-87-2.
- Klaniczay, Gábor (2002). Holy Rulers and Blessed Princes: Dynastic Cults in Medieval Central Europe. Cambridge University Press. ISBN 0-521-42018-0.

{ Jan Dlugosz, The Annals of Jan Dlugosz: A History of Eastern Europe from A.D. 965 to A.D. 1480, trans. Maurice Michael (IM Publications, 1997), 177. }

Kinga of Poland House of Árpád Born: 5 March 1224 Died: 24 July 1292
Royal titles
Preceded by Agafia of Rus	High Duchess consort of Poland; 1243–1279	Succeeded by Agrippina of Kiev
