= Maria Laskarina =

Queen consort of Hungary (c. 1206 – 1270)

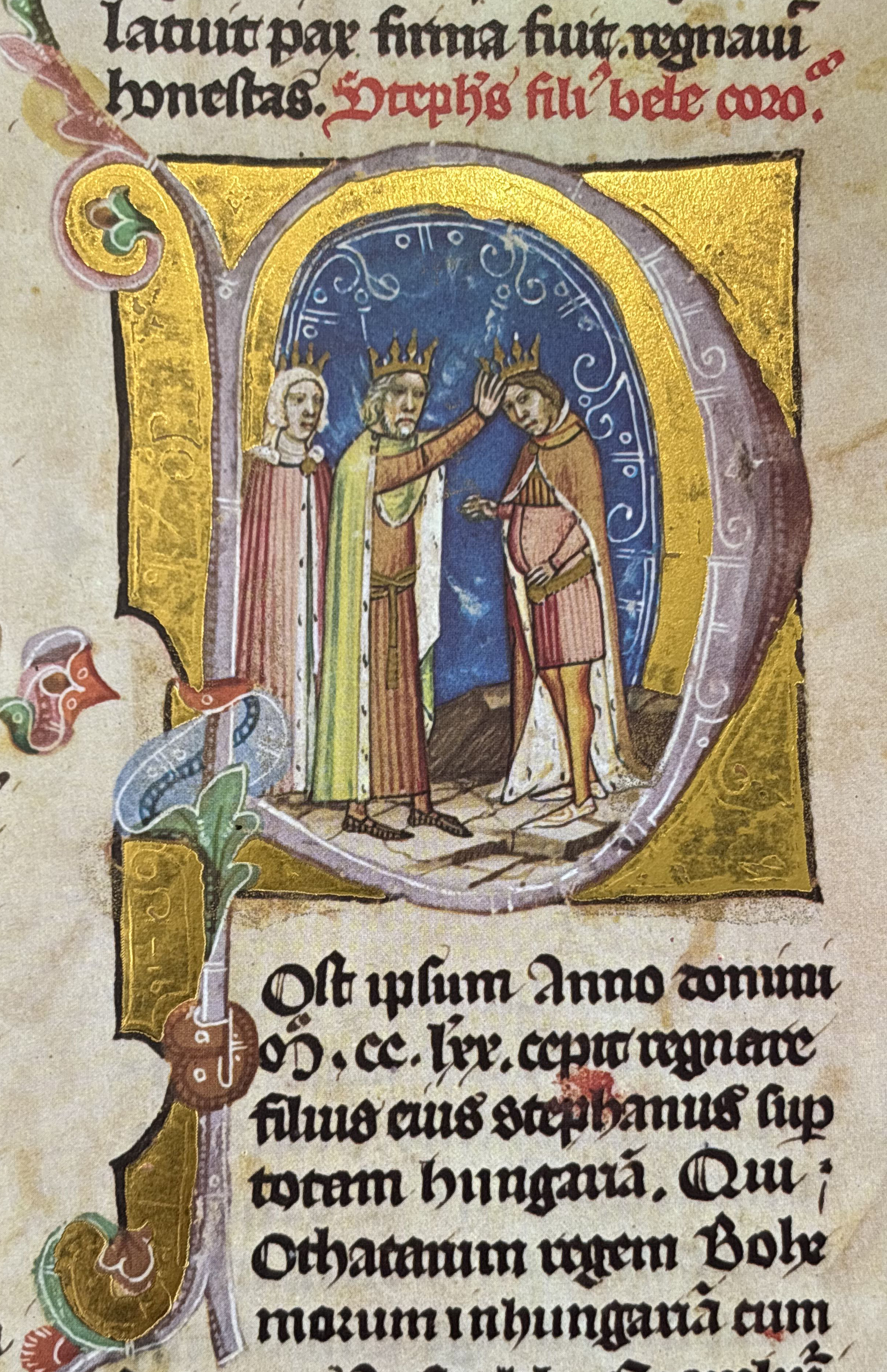
- Stephen is crowned as rex iunior by his parents, King Béla IV and Queen Maria, as depicted in the Illuminated Chronicle

Queen consort of Hungary
- Tenure: 1235–1270
- Born: c. 1206
- Died: 24 June or 16 July 1270
- Spouse: Béla IV of Hungary
- Issue: Margaret de Saint-Omer, Saint Kinga, Queen of Poland; Anna, Baness of Slavonia; Catherine of Hungary (died young); Elisabeth, Duchess of Bavaria; Constance, Queen of Galicia; Yolande, Duchess of Greater Poland; Stephen V of Hungary, Saint Margaret of Hungary; Béla, Duke of Slavonia
- House: Laskaris
- Father: Theodore I Komnenos Laskaris
- Mother: Anna Angelina

Maria Laskarina (Greek: Μαρία Λασκαρίνα, romanized: María Laskarina, Hungarian: Laszkarisz Mária, c. 1206 – 24 June or 16 July 1270) was a Greek Queen consort of Hungary by marriage to King Béla IV of Hungary. She was the daughter of Theodore I Laskaris and Anna Komnena Angelina.

== Life ==
She was a younger sister of Irene Lascarina, first Empress consort of John III Doukas Vatatzes. Theodore married his eldest daughter to his designated heir in 1212. Theodore was widowed in the same year and proceeded to marriages with Philippa of Armenia and Marie de Courtenay. However John was never displaced in succession.

As a younger daughter, the marriage of Maria was not intended to add a potential husband in the line of succession to the throne. Instead it secured a marital alliance with the Kingdom of Hungary.

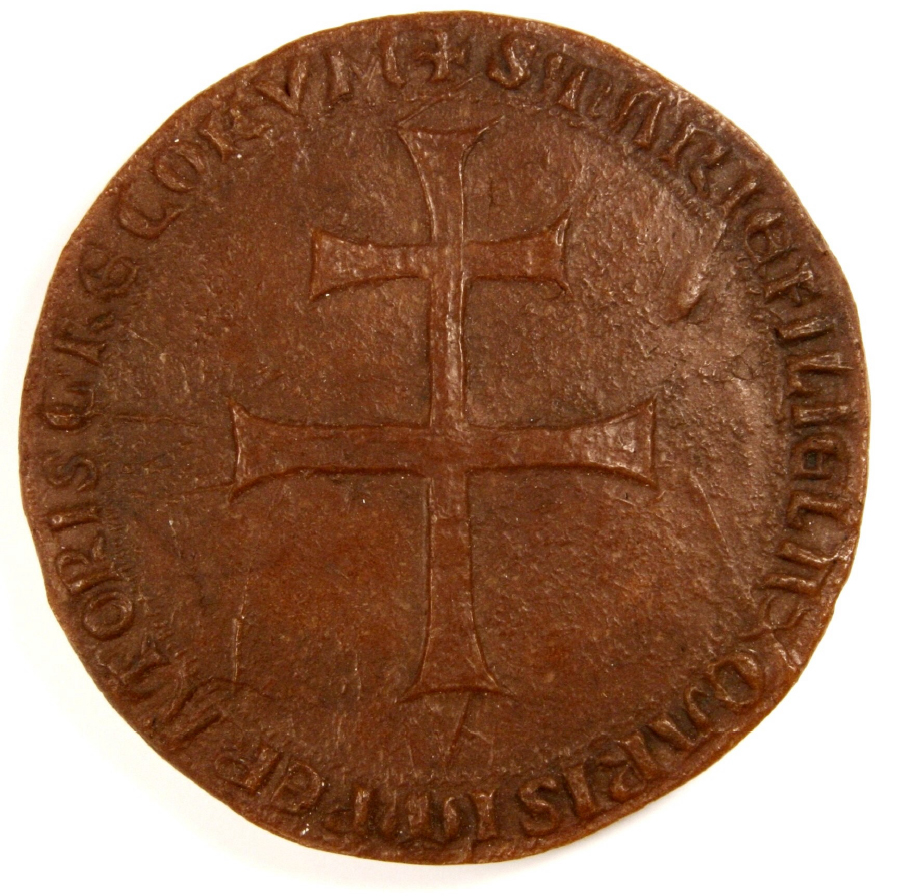
The seal (1270) of Queen consort Maria Laskarina

In 1218, Maria was married to prince Béla of Hungary, and became Roman Catholic, converting from Greek Orthodoxy, her religion by birth. Bride and groom were about twelve-years-old. Her husband was the eldest son of Andrew II of Hungary and Gertrude of Merania.

King Andrew II of Hungary died on 21 September 1235. The crown prince succeeded him as King Béla IV of Hungary and Maria became queen consort. Béla reigned for thirty-five years and died on 3 May 1270. Maria survived him by about two months. According to the 15th-century Formulary Book of Somogyvár, she died on 23 July 1270 and was buried in the church of the Franciscans in Esztergom.

During the Mongol Invasion of Hungary, Maria and her children were sent by Béla to the Fortress of Klis, Split, along with many other Hungarian noblewomen who had been widowed by the Tatars. She supported her husband against their son Stephen during the 1260s civil wars.

== Children ==
Maria and Béla IV of Hungary had:

- Saint Kinga of Hungary (5 March 1224 – 24 July 1292), also known as Kunigunda. She was married to King Boleslaus V of Poland, after his death becoming a nun and abbess; she was canonized by Pope John Paul II in 1999.
- Margaret of Hungary (c. 1225 – 20 April 1242). Betrothed to William of Saint Omer.
- Anna of Hungary (c. 1226 – after 1270). Married Rostislav of Slavonia, Duke of Chernigov
- Catherine of Hungary (c. 1229–1242). She died while fleeing with her family following the Battle of Mohi.
- Blessed Yolanda of Hungary (c. 1235–1298) married Boleslaus of Greater Poland, later became a nun and abbess, who has been declared as a candidate for sainthood.
- Elizabeth of Hungary (c. 1236 – 24 October 1271). Married Henry XIII, Duke of Bavaria
- Constance of Hungary (c. 1237 – after 1252). Married Leo I of Halych
- Stephen V of Hungary (December 1239 – 6 August 1272)
- Saint Margaret of Hungary (27 January 1242 – 18 January 1271) Named after an older sister. Canonized by the Roman Catholic Church in 1943, for whom Margaret Island in Budapest is named, having been the place where a royal monastery was established by her parents for her.
- Béla, Duke of Slavonia, Croatia and Dalmatia (c. 1249–1269). Married Kunigunde of Brandenburg, a daughter of Otto III, Margrave of Brandenburg. His widow married Waleran IV of Limburg.

== Sources ==
- Angold, Michael (2011). "The Latin Empire of Constantinople, 1204–1261: Marriage Strategies". Identities and Allegiances in the Eastern Mediterranean after 1204. Farnham: Ashgate Publishing Limited. pp. 47–68. ISBN 9781409410980.
- Engel, Pál (2001). The Realm of St. Stephen: A History of Medieval Hungary, 895-1526. London & New York: I.B.Tauris. ISBN 9781850439776.
- Klaniczay, Gábor (2002). Holy Rulers and Blessed Princesses: Dynastic Cults in Medieval Central Europe. Translated by Palmai, Eva. Cambridge University Press.
- Moravcsik, Gyula (1970). Byzantium and the Magyars. Budapest: Akadémiai Kiadó.
- Ostrogorsky, George (1956). History of the Byzantine State. Oxford: Basil Blackwell.

Maria Laskarina Laskarid dynasty Born: c. 1206 Died: 1270
Royal titles
Preceded by Beatrice D'Este	Queen consort of Hungary; 1235–1270	Succeeded by Elizabeth the Cuman
