= List of Bavarian consorts =

There have been three kinds of Bavarian consorts in history: duchesses, electresses and queens. Most consorts listed are duchesses. The first ever consort of Bavaria was Waldrada in the 6th century. The final consort was Maria Theresia of Austria-Este in 1913.

The longest serving house was the Wittelsbach dynasty, who played a major role in Bavarian history. During the medieval period under the Wittelsbach dynasty, Bavaria was split into two parts, Upper and Lower Bavaria. This meant that there may have been more than one Duchess of Bavaria at the same time, due to messy inheritance among heirs. Three of the break-away Wittelsbach families were: Landshut, Munich and Ingolstadt.

Since 555 there have been 99 Bavarian consorts: 78 duchesses, 11 queens, 10 electresses and one margravine. The number does not add up because Elisabeth of Lorraine and Caroline of Baden, held two titles. There were a few consorts that married twice, usually their brothers-in-law. It was common for the ruler of Bavaria to have more than one wife. His wives may have died childless or they divorced, because the marriage was childless. Most of the marriages were to make a treaty with the family of the consort.

== Ducal Bavaria ==
Agilolfing dynasty
Image	Name	Father	Birth	Marriage	Became Duchess	Ceased to be Duchess	Death	Husband
	Waldrada of the Lombards	Wacho, King of the Lombards (Lethings)	c. 531	c. 556		c. 572		Garibald I
No names of Bavarian duchesses are mention during until 610.
	Geila of Friuli	Gisulf II, Duke of Friuli	?	?	c. 610 husband's accession	c. 625/630 husband's death	?	Garibald II
Bavarian duchesses or dukes for a half of a century after Garibald II is not very clear until Folchiade of Salzeburg.
	Fara of Bavaria	A King of the Lombards	?	?	?	?	?	Theodo I
	Gleisnod de Friuli	?	?	?	?	?	?	Theodo I
	Folchiade of Salzeburg	?	?	?	?	?	?	Theodo II
	Regintrude of Austrasia	Dagobert I, King of the Franks? (Merovingians)?	c. 660–665	?	?	c. 716 husband's death	c. 730–740	Theodo II
	Regintrude of Austrasia	Dagobert I, King of the Franks? (Merovingians)?	c. 660–665	?	c. 716 husband's accession	c. 719 husband's death	c. 730–740	Theodbert
	Waldrada	?	?	?	c. 716 husband's accession	c. 719 husband's death	?	Theobald
	Biltrude	?	?	?	c. 716 husband's accession	c. 719 husband's death	?	Theobald
	Waldrada	?	?	?	c. 716 husband's accession	c. 719 husband's death	?	Tassilo II
	Imma of Alamannia	?	?	?	c. 716 husband's accession	c. 719 husband's death	c. 750	Tassilo II
	Biltrude	?	?	somewhere after 719		c. 725 husband's accession as Duke of All Bavaria	after 725	Grimoald
	Hiltrud of the Franks	Charles Martel, Duke and Prince of the Franks (Carolingians)	c. 715/720	c. 741		18 January 748 husband's death	c. 754	Odilo
	Mother of his two sons (name unknown)	?	?	753 husband usurped power	753 husband lost power	?	?	Grifo
	Liutperga of the Lombards	Desiderius, King of the Lombards	c. 715/720	before 770		c. 788 husband and herself deposed and enter monastery	c. 793	Tassilo III
Carolingian dynasty
Image	Name	Father	Born	Married	Became Consort	Ceased to be Consort	Died	Husband
	Fastrada of Franconia	Raoul III of Franconia	c. 765	c. 784 as sole-Queen consort of the Franks and co-Queen consort the Lombards c. 788 husband became ruler of Bavaria		10 October 794		Charlemagne, Emperor and King of the Franks
	Luitgard of Sundgau	Luitfrid II, Count of Sundgau (Etichonids)	c. 776	c. 794 as sole-Queen consort of the Franks and co-Queen consort of the Lombards		4 June 800		Charlemagne, Emperor and King of the Franks
	Ermengarde of Hesbaye	Ingerman, Count of Hesbaye (Robertians)	c. 778	c. 794/5	c. 813 as Holy Roman Empress and Queen consort of the Franks c. 817 as senior Holy Roman Empress	c. 817 son became king of Bavaria	3 October 818	Louis the Pious, Emperor and King of the Franks
	Emma of Altdorf	Welf, Count of Altorf (Elder Welfs)	c. 808	c. 827 as Queen consort of Bavaria; August 843 as Queen consort of the East Franks		31 January 876		Louis the German, King of the East Franks and Bavaria
	Liutgard of Saxony	Liudolf, Duke of the Eastern Saxons (Liudolfings)	c. 845	29 November 874	28 August 876 as Queen consort of Saxony; 29 September 880 as Queen consort of Bavaria	20 January 882 husband's death	17 November 885	Louis the Younger, King of Saxony and Bavaria
	Richardis of Swabia	Erchanger, Count of the Nordgau (Ahalolfings)	c. 840	c. 862	29 November 874 as Queen consort of Alemannia; 12 February 881 as Holy Roman Empress; 20 January 882 as Queen consort of the East Franks; 12 December 884 as Queen consort of the West Franks	17 November 887 husband's desposition	18 September, between 894 and 896	Charles the Fat, Emperor and King of the Franks
	Ota of Neustria	Berengar I of Neustria (Conradines)	c. 874	c. 888	c. 888 as Queen consort of the East Franks; 22 February 896 as Holy Roman Empress and Queen consort of Italy	8 December 899 husband's death	899–903	Arnulf of Carinthia, Emperor and King of the East Franks
Luitpolding dynasty
Image	Name	Father	Born	Married	Became Consort	Ceased to be Consort	Died	Husband
	Cunigunde of Swabia	Berthold I, Count Palatine of Swabia (Ahalolfings)	c. 870/880	?	? as Margravine of Bavaria	4 July 907 husband's death	?	Luitpold
	Judith of Friuli	Saint Eberhard, Duke of Friuli (Unruochings)	c. 888	c. 910		14 July 937 husband's death	?	Arnulf
	Biltrude	?	?	?	c. 938 husband's accession	23 November 947 husband's death	?	Berthold
Ottonian dynasty
Image	Name	Father	Born	Married	Became Duchess	Ceased to be Duchess	Died	Husband
	Judith, Duchess of Bavaria	Arnulf (Luitpoldings)	c. 925	?	23 November 947 husband's accession	1 November 955 husband's death	June soon after 985	Henry I
	Gisela of Burgundy	Conrad I of Burgundy (Elder Welfs)	before 952	before 972		c. 976 husband's desposition	21 July 1006	Henry II
Luitpolding dynasty
Ottonian dynasty
Image	Name	Father	Born	Married	Became Duchess	Ceased to be Duchess	Died	Husband
	Gisela of Burgundy	Conrad I of Burgundy (Elder Welfs)	before 952	before 972	c. 985 husband's restoration	28 August 995 husband's death	21 July 1006	Henry II
	Saint Cunigunde of Luxembourg	Siegfried, Count of Luxembourg (Elder Luxembourg)	c. 975	c. 1000		c. 1004; Bavaria given to Henry V	3 March 1040	Henry IV
Luxembourg dynasty
Salian dynasty
Image	Name	Father	Born	Married	Became Duchess	Ceased to be Duchess	Died	Husband
	Gunhilda Knutsdotter of Denmark	Knut the Great (Denmark)	c. 975	May 1035/1036		18 July 1038		Henry VI
Luxembourg dynasty
Ezzonian dynasty
Image	Name	Father	Born	Married	Became Duchess	Ceased to be Duchess	Died	Husband
	Judith of Schweinfurt	Otto III, Duke of Swabia	?	?		c. 1053; Bavaria given to Henry V	c. 1104	Conrad I
Salian dynasty
Northeim dynasty
Image	Name	Father	Born	Married	Became Duchess	Ceased to be Duchess	Died	Husband
	Richenza of Swabia	Otto II, Duke of Swabia (Ezzonids)	c. 1020/1025	c. 1050	c. 1061; Bavaria granted to husband	c. 1070; Bavaria taken from husband	c. 1083	Otto of Nordheim
Welf dynasty
Image	Name	Father	Born	Married	Became Duchess	Ceased to be Duchess	Died	Husband
	Ethelinde of Northeim	Otto of Nordheim (Northeim)	c. 1160	c. 1062	c. 1070		?	Welf I
	Judith of Flanders	Baldwin IV, Count of Flanders (Flanders)	c. 1030	c. 1071		May 1077; Bavaria deprived from husband	5 March 1095	Welf I
Salian dynasty
Image	Name	Father	Born	Married	Became Duchess	Ceased to be Duchess	Died	Husband
Bertha of Savoy, the Holy Roman Empress	Bertha of Savoy	Otto, Count of Savoy (Savoy)	21 September 1051	13 July 1066	1077; Bavaria taken back from Welf I	27 December 1087		Henry VIII
	Eupraxia Vsevolovna of Kiev	Vsevolod I, Grand Prince of Kiev (Rurikids)	c. 1071	14 August 1089		c. 1096; Bavaria given to Welf I	20 July 1109	Henry VIII
Welf dynasty
Image	Name	Father	Born	Married	Became Duchess	Ceased to be Duchess	Died	Husband
	Matilda of Canossa	Boniface III, Margrave of Tuscany (Canossa)	c. 1046	c. 1089	6 November 1101 husband's accession	24 July 1115		Welf II
	Wulfhilde of Saxony	Magnus, Duke of Saxony (Billung)	c. 1075	c. 1095/1100	c. 1120 husband's accession	early 1126 husband abdicated as duke and retired to Weingarten Abbey	29 December 1126	Henry IX
	Gertrude of Süpplingenburg	Lothair III, Holy Roman Emperor (Süpplingenburg)	18 April 1115	29 May 1127		20 October 1139 husband's death	18 April 1143	Henry X
Babenberg dynasty
Image	Name	Father	Born	Married	Became Consort	Ceased to be Consort	Died	Husband
	Maria of Bohemia	Soběslav I, Duke of Bohemia (Přemyslids)	c. 1024/25	28 September 1138	c. 1139; Bavaria granted to husband	18 October 1141 husband's death	c. 1160	Leopold I
	Gertrude of Süpplingenburg	Lothair III, Holy Roman Emperor (Süpplingenburg)	18 April 1115	1 May 1142		18 April 1143		Henry XI
	Theodora Komnene	Sebastokrator Andronikos Komnenos (Komnenos)	–	1148		17 September 1156; Privilegium Minus	2 January 1184	Henry XI
Welf dynasty
Image	Name	Father	Born	Married	Became Duchess	Ceased to be Duchess	Died	Husband
	Clementia of Zähringen	Conrad, Duke of Zähringen (Zähringen)	-	1148/49	17 September 1156; Privilegium Minus	1162 divorce	1148/49	Henry XII
	Matilda of England	Henry II of England (Plantagenet)	June 1156	1 February 1168		1180 husband lost the duchy	28 June 1189	Henry XII
Wittelsbach dynasty
Image	Name	Father	Born	Married	Became Consort	Ceased to be Consort	Died	Husband
	Agnes of Loon	Louis I, Count of Loon (Loon)	c. 1150	c. 1157/1169	16 September 1180; Bavaria given to husband	11 July 1183 husband's death	26 March 1191	Otto I Wittelsbach
	Ludmilla of Bohemia	Frederick, Duke of Bohemia (Přemyslids)	1170	October 1204		15 September 1231 husband's death	14 August 1240	Louis I
	Agnes of the Palatinate	Henry V, Count Palatine of the Rhine (Welf)	c. 1201	May 1222	15 September 1231 husband's accession	29 November 1253 husband's death	16 November 1267	Otto II Wittelsbach
Bavaria partitioned into Upper and Lower Bavaria.
	Elizabeth of Hungary	Béla IV of Hungary (Árpád)	c. 1236	c. 1250	29 November 1253 husband's accession	24 October 1271		Henry XIII (Lower Bavaria)
	Maria of Brabant	Henry II, Duke of Brabant (Leuven)	1226	2 August 1254		18 January 1256		Louis II (Upper Bavaria)
	Anna of Glogau	Konrad I, Duke of Silesia-Glogau (Piast)	1250/52	24 August 1260		25 June 1271		Louis II (Upper Bavaria)
	Matilda of Habsburg	Rudolph I of Germany (Habsburg)	1252	24 October 1273		2 February 1294 husband's death	23 December 1304	Louis II (Upper Bavaria)
	Isabelle of Lorraine	Frederick III, Duke of Lorraine (Metz)	?	c. 1287	3 February 1290 husband's accession	9 October 1296 husband's death	c. 1335	Louis III (Lower Bavaria)
	Jutta of Schweidnitz	Bolko I, Duke of Jawor and Świdnica (Piast)	c. 1285/87	c. 1297/99		10 December 1310 husband's death	15 September 1320	Stephen I (Lower Bavaria)
	Agnes of Glogau	Henry III, Duke of Silesia-Glogau (Piast)	c. 1293/96	18 May 1309		9 November 1312 husband's death	25 December 1361	Otto III (Lower Bavaria)
	Mechtild of Nassau	Adolf, King of the Romans (Nassau)	before 1280	1 September 1294		c. 1317 husband's desposition	19 June 1323	Rudolf I (Upper Bavaria)
	Beatrix of Świdnica	Bolko I, Duke of Jawor and Świdnica (Piast)	1290/2	14 October 1308/11 as Duchess consort of Upper Bavaria		25 August 1322		Louis IV (United Bavaria)
	Margaret of Holland	William I, Count of Hainaut (Avesnes)	1311	26 February 1324 as Duchess consort of Upper Bavaria; 20 December 1340 as Duchess consort of Lower Bavaria; January 1341 as Duchess consort of All Bavaria		11 October 1347 husband's death	23 June 1356	Louis IV (United Bavaria)
	Richardis of Jülich	Gerhard V of Jülich (Jülich)	c. 1314	c. 1330		14 December 1334 husband's death	c. 1360	Otto IV (Lower Bavaria)
	Margaret of Bohemia	John I of Bohemia (Luxembourg)	8 July 1313	2 August 1328		1 September 1339 husband's death	11 July 1341	Henry XIV (Lower Bavaria)
	Anna of Austria	Frederick I, Duke of Austria (Habsburg)	c. 1318	c. 1326–1328		18 June 1333 husband's death	14/15 December 1343	Henry XV (Upper Bavaria)
Bavaria reunited in 1341 under Louis IV. It passed to his six sons in this state, in 1347, until it was repartitioned into Upper and Lower Bavaria with each brother co-ruling with each other, in 1349.
	Margarete Maultasch	Henry of Bohemia (Meinhardiner)	c. 1318	10 February 1342	11 October 1347 as Duchess consort of Bavaria c. 1349 as Duchess consort of Upper Bavaria	18 September 1361 husband's death	3 October 1369	Louis V (Bavaria and 2nd Partition)
	Elisabeth of Sicily	Frederick III of Sicily (Barcelona)	c. 1310	27 June 1328	11 October 1347 as Duchess consort of Bavaria c. 1349 as Duchess consort of Lower Bavaria	c. 1349		Stephen II (Bavaria and 2nd Partition)
	Margarete of Nuremberg	John II, Burgrave of Nuremberg (Hohenzollern)	c. 1315	14 February 1359 as Duchess consort of Bavaria-Landshut; 13 January 1363 as Duchess consort of Upper Bavaria		13 May 1375 husband's death	19 September 1377	Stephen II (Bavaria and 2nd Partition)
	Cunigunde of Poland	Casimir III of Poland (Piast)	c. 1334	1 January 1352	11 October 1347 as Duchess consort of Upper Bavaria	26 April 1357		Louis VI (Bavaria and 2nd Partition)
	Ingeborg of Mecklenburg-Schwerin	Albert II, Duke of Mecklenburg (Mecklenburg-Schwerin)	c. 1340	15 February 1360 as Duchess consort of Upper Bavaria		17 May 1365 husband's death	25 July 1395	Louis VI (Bavaria and 2nd Partition)
	Maud of Lancaster	Henry of Grosmont, 1st Duke of Lancaster (Plantagenet)	4 April 1339	c. 1352 as Duchess consort of Lower Bavaria c. 1353 as Duchess consort of Bavaria-Straubing		10 April 1362		William I (Bavaria and 2nd Partition)
	Margaret of Legnica-Brzeg	Ludwik I, Duke of Legnica-Brzeg (Piast)	c. 1342/1343	after 19 July 1353 as Duchess consort of Bavaria-Straubing		February 1386		Albert I (Bavaria and 2nd Partition)
	Margaret of Cleves	Adolph I, Count of Cleves (De la Marck)	c. 1375	c. 1394 as Duchess consort of Bavaria-Straubing		13 December 1404 husband's death	14 May 1411	Albert I (Bavaria and 2nd Partition)
	Katharine of Bohemia	Charles IV, Holy Roman Emperor (Luxembourg)	19 August 1342	19 March 1366 as Duchess consort of Upper Bavaria; 13 May 1375 as Duchess consort of Bavaria-Straubing		15 November 1379 husband's death	26 April 1395	Otto V (Bavaria and 2nd Partition)
	Margaret of Austria	Albert II, Duke of Austria (Habsburg)	c. 1346	4 September 1359	18 September 1361 as Duchess consort of Upper Bavaria	13 January 1363 husband's death	14 January 1366	Meinhard (Upper Bavaria)
	Katharina of Görz	Meinhard VI, Count of Görz (Görz)	c. 1346	c. 1372	13 May 1375 as Duchess consort of Bavaria-Landshut	c. 1391		John II (Bavaria-Munich)
	Anna of Neuffen	Berthold VII of Neuffen (Neuffen)	?	16 May 1360	13 May 1375 as Duchess consort of Bavaria-Landshut	c. 1381		Frederick (Bavaria-Landshut)
	Maddalena Visconti	Bernabò Visconti, Lord of Milan (Visconti)	c. 1366	2 September 1381 as Duchess consort of Bavaria-Landshut		4 December 1393 husband's death	17 July 1404	Frederick (Bavaria-Landshut)
	Taddea Visconti	Bernabò Visconti, Lord of Milan (Visconti)	c. 1352	13 October 1364/12 August 1367	13 May 1375 as Duchess consort of Bavaria-Landshut c. 1392 as Duchess consort of Bavaria-Ingolstadt	28 September 1381		Stephen III (Bavaria-Ingolstadt)
	Elisabeth of Cleves	Adolph I, Count of Cleves (De la Marck)	c. 1378	16 January 1401 as Duchess consort of Bavaria-Ingolstadt		26 September 1413 husband's death	c. 1424	Stephen III (Bavaria-Ingolstadt)
	Margaret of Austria	Albert IV, Duke of Austria (Habsburg)	26 June 1395	25 November 1412 as Duchess consort of Bavaria-Landshut; 1 May 1447 as Duchess consort of Bavaria-Ingolstadt		24 December 1447		Henry XVI (Bavaria-Landshut)
	Margaret of Cleves	Adolph I, Duke of Cleves (De la Marck)	23 February 1416	11 May 1433 as Duchess consort of Bavaria-Munich and Bavaria-Straubing		12 September 1435 husband's death	20 May 1444	William III (Bavaria-Munich)
	Elisabetta Visconti	Bernabò Visconti, Lord of Milan (Visconti)	c. 1374	26 January 1395	c. 1397 as Duchess consort of Bavaria-Munich c. 1429 as Duchess consort of Bavaria-Straubing	2 February 1432		Ernest (Bavaria-Munich)
	Margaret of Burgundy	Philip II, Duke of Burgundy (Valois-Burgundy)	October 1374	12 April 1385	13 December 1404 as Duchess consort of Bavaria-Straubing	31 May 1417 husband's death	8 March 1441	William II (Bavaria-Straubing)
	Catherine of Alençon	Peter II, Count of Alençon (Valois-Alençon)	c. 1396	1 October 1413 as Duchess consort of Bavaria-Ingolstadt		c. 1443 husband's imprisonment 1 May 1447 husband's death	25 June 1462	Louis VII (Bavaria-Ingolstadt)
	Elisabeth of Görlitz	John of Görlitz (Luxembourg)	November 1390	10 March 1418 as Duchess consort of Bavaria-Straubing		6 January 1425 husband's death	2 August 1451	John III (Bavaria-Straubing)
	Anna of Brunswick-Grubenhagen-Einbeck	Eric I, Duke of Brunswick-Grubenhagen (Brunswick-Grubenhagen)	c. 1414/20	22 January 1437	2 July 1438 as Duchess consort of Bavaria-Munich	29 February 1460 husband's death	c. 1474	Albert III (Bavaria-Munich)
	Margaret of Brandenburg	Frederick I, Elector of Brandenburg (Hohenzollern)	c. 1410	20 July 1441	c. 1443 as Duchess consort of Bavaria-Ingolstadt	7 April 1445 husband's death	27 July 1465	Louis VIII (Bavaria-Ingolstadt)
	Amalia of Saxony	Frederick II, Elector of Saxony (Wettin)	4 April 1436	21 March 1452 as Duchess consort of Bavaria-Landshut		18 January 1479 husband's death	19 October 1501	Louis IX (Bavaria-Landshut)
	Jadwiga Jagiellonca	Casimir IV Jagiellon (Jagiellon)	21 September 1457	14 November 1475	18 January 1479 as Duchess consort of Bavaria-Landshut	18 February 1502		George (Bavaria-Landshut)
Image	Name	Father	Born	Married	Became Duchess	Ceased to be Duchess	Died	Husband

== Duchy of Bavaria ==
Picture	Image	Father	Birth	Marriage	Became Duchess	Ceased to be Duchess	Death	Husband
	Kunigunde of Austria	Frederick III, Holy Roman Emperor (Habsburg)	16 March 1465	3 January 1487 as Duchess consort of Bavaria-Munich; 1 December 1503 as Duchess consort of All Bavaria		18 March 1508 husband's death	6 August 1520	Albert IV
	Marie of Baden-Sponheim	Philip I, Margrave of Baden (Baden)	25 June 1507	5 October 1522		7 March 1550 husband's death	16 November 1580	William IV
	Anne of Austria	Ferdinand I, Holy Roman Emperor (Habsburg)	7 July 1528	4 July 1546	7 March 1550 husband's accession	24 October 1579 husband's death	16 October 1590	Albert V
	Renata of Lorraine	Francis I, Duke of Lorraine (Lorraine)	20 April 1544	22 February 1568	24 October 1579 husband's accession	15 October 1597 husband's abdication	22 May 1602	William V
	Elisabeth of Lorraine	Charles III, Duke of Lorraine (Lorraine)	9 October 1574	6 February 1595	15 October 1597 husband's accession	23 February 1623 elevated to Electress	4 January 1635	Maximilian I
Picture	Name	Father	Birth	Marriage	Became Duchess	Ceased to be Duchess	Death	Spouse

== Electorate of Bavaria ==
Image	Name	Father	Birth	Marriage	Became Electress	Ceased to be Electress	Death	Husband
	Elisabeth of Lorraine	Charles III, Duke of Lorraine (Lorraine)	9 October 1574	6 February 1595	23 February 1623 elevation from Duchess	4 January 1635		Maximilian I
	Maria Anna of Austria	Ferdinand II, Holy Roman Emperor (Habsburg)	13 January 1610	15 July 1635		27 September 1651 husband's death	25 September 1665	Maximilian I
	Henriette Adelaide of Savoy	Victor Amadeus I, Duke of Savoy (Savoy)	6 November 1636	8 December 1650	27 September 1651 husband's accession	13 June 1676		Ferdinand Maria
	Maria Antonia of Austria	Leopold I, Holy Roman Emperor (Habsburg)	18 January 1669	15 July 1685		24 December 1692		Maximilian II Emanuel
	Theresa Kunegunda Sobieska	John III Sobieski, King of Poland (Sobieski)	4 March 1676	2 January 1695		26 February 1726 husband's death	10 March 1730	Maximilian II Emanuel
	Maria Amalia of Austria	Joseph I, Holy Roman Emperor (Habsburg)	22 October 1701	5 October 1722	26 February 1726 husband's accession	20 January 1745 husband's death	11 December 1756	Charles Albert
	Maria Anna Sophia of Saxony	Augustus III of Poland (Wettin)	29 August 1728	9 July 1747		30 December 1777 husband's death	17 February 1797	Maximilian III Joseph
	Elisabeth Augusta of the Palatinate-Sulzbach	Joseph Charles, Count Palatine of Sulzbach (Wittelsbach)	17 January 1721	17 January 1742	30 December 1777 husband's accession	17 August 1794		Charles Theodore
	Maria Leopoldine of Austria-Este	Ferdinand I, Archduke of Austria-Este (Austria-Este)	10 December 1776	15 February 1795		16 February 1799 husband's death	23 June 1848	Charles Theodore
	Caroline of Baden (Also Duchess consort of Zweibrücken.)	Charles Louis, Hereditary Prince of Baden (Baden)	13 July 1776	9 March 1797	16 February 1799 husband's accession	1 January 1806 elevated to Queen	13 November 1841	Maximilian IV Joseph
Picture	Name	Father	Birth	Marriage	Became Electress	Ceased to be Electress	Death	Spouse

== Kingdom of Bavaria ==
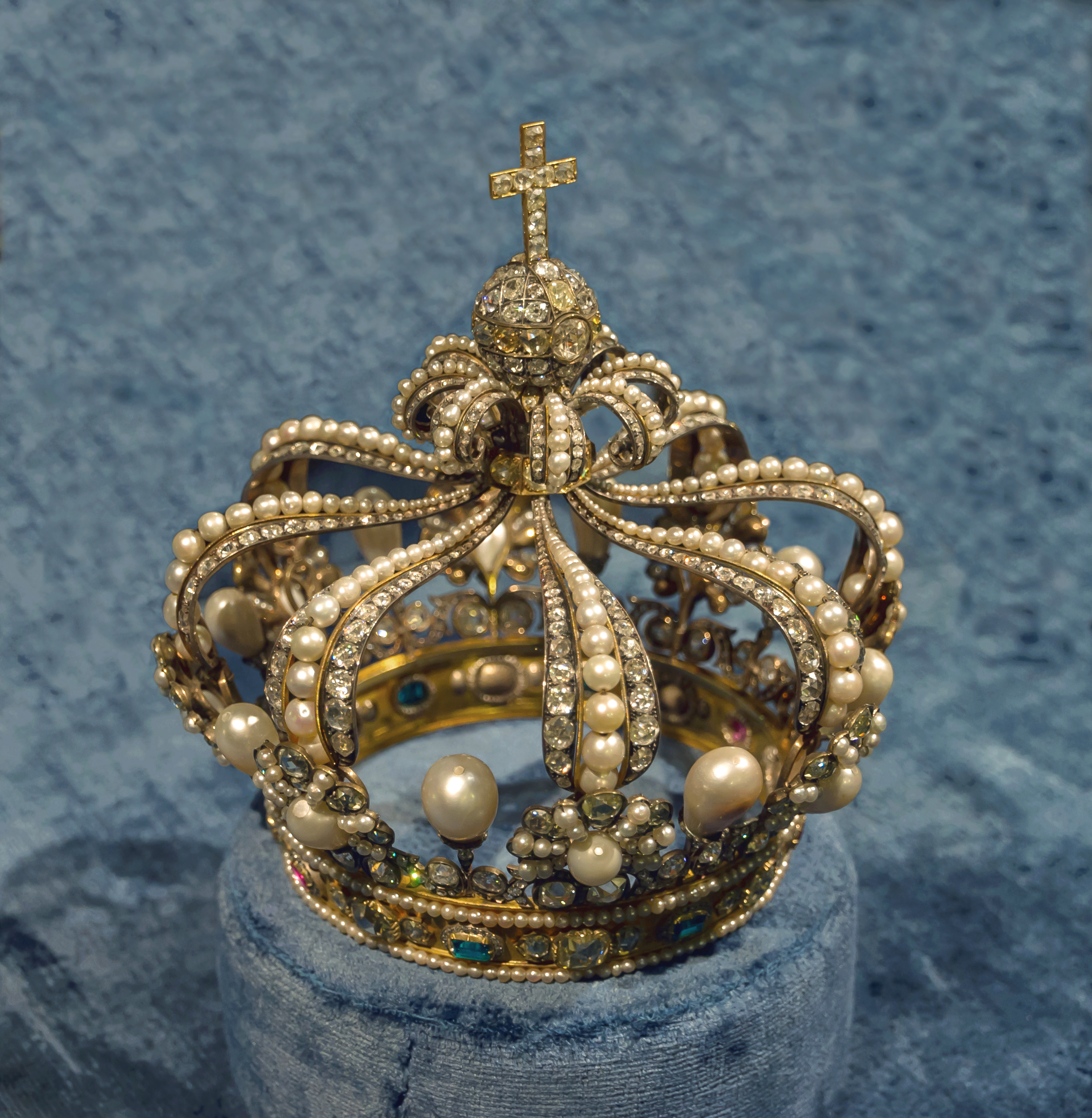
Crown of queens of Bavaria, Schatzkammer, Residenz, Munich

Note: All Frankish queens in the Ducal Bavaria section were also Queens consorts of Bavaria not Duchess consorts of Bavaria.

Picture	Name	Father	Birth	Marriage	Became Queen	Ceased to be Queen	Death	Husband
	Caroline of Baden (Also Duchess consort of Zweibrücken.)	Charles Louis, Hereditary Prince of Baden (Baden)	13 July 1776	9 March 1797	1 January 1806 elevated from Electress	13 October 1825 husband's death	13 November 1841	Maximilian I Joseph
	Therese of Saxe-Hildburghausen	Frederick, Duke of Saxe-Hildburghausen (Saxe-Hildburghausen)	8 July 1792	12 October 1810	13 October 1825 husband's accession	20 March 1848 husband's abdication	26 October 1854	Louis I
	Marie of Prussia	Prince Wilhelm of Prussia (Hohenzollern)	15 October 1825	12 October 1842	20 March 1848 husband's accession	10 March 1864 husband's death	17 May 1889	Maximilian II
	Maria Theresa of Austria-Este	Archduke Ferdinand Charles of Austria-Este (Austria-Este)	2 July 1849	20 February 1868	5 November 1913 husband's accession	7 November 1918 husband's desposition	3 February 1919	Louis III
Image	Name	Father	Born	Married	Became Queen	Ceased to be Queen	Died	Husband
