= 725 =

Calendar year

725 in various calendars
Gregorian calendar	725; DCCXXV
Ab urbe condita	1478
Armenian calendar	174; ԹՎ ՃՀԴ
Assyrian calendar	5475
Balinese saka calendar	646–647
Bengali calendar	131–132
Berber calendar	1675
Buddhist calendar	1269
Burmese calendar	87
Byzantine calendar	6233–6234
Chinese calendar	甲子年 (Wood Rat); 3422 or 3215 — to — 乙丑年 (Wood Ox); 3423 or 3216
Coptic calendar	441–442
Discordian calendar	1891
Ethiopian calendar	717–718
Hebrew calendar	4485–4486
- Hindu calendars
Vikram Samvat	781–782
Shaka Samvat	646–647
Kali Yuga	3825–3826
Holocene calendar	10725
Iranian calendar	103–104
Islamic calendar	106–107
Japanese calendar	Jinki 2 (神亀２年)
Javanese calendar	618–619
Julian calendar	725; DCCXXV
Korean calendar	3058
Minguo calendar	1187 before ROC 民前1187年
Nanakshahi calendar	−743
Seleucid era	1036/1037 AG
Thai solar calendar	1267–1268
Tibetan calendar	ཤིང་ཕོ་བྱི་བ་ལོ་ (male Wood-Rat); 851 or 470 or −302 — to — ཤིང་མོ་གླང་ལོ་ (female Wood-Ox); 852 or 471 or −301

Year 725 (DCCXXV) was a common year starting on Monday of the Julian calendar, the 726th year of the Common Era (CE) and Anno Domini (AD) designations, the 725th year of the 1st millennium, the 25th year of the 8th century, and the 6th year of the 720s decade.The denomination 725 for this year has been used since the early medieval period, when the Anno Domini calendar era became the prevalent method in Europe for naming years.

== Events ==
=== By place ===
==== Europe ====
- Umayyad conquest of Gaul: Muslim forces under Anbasa ibn Suhaym al-Kalbi (governor of Al-Andalus) capture the fortified town of Carcassonne, which has been under siege (see 720), as well as Nîmes in Septimania (the latter without resistance).
- Summer – al-Samh's successor, Anbasa ibn Suhaym al-Kalbi, moves against Gothic nobles resisting surrender. The city of Carcassonne is besieged, and its Gothic ruler forced to cede half of his territory, pay tribute, and make an offensive and defensive alliance with Muslim forces. The Gothic rulers of Nîmes and the other resisting Septimanian cities also eventually fall under the sway of the Umayyads.
- Duke Eudes of Aquitaine seeks an alliance with Munuza, governor of Cerdagne (eastern Pyrenees), currently in rebellion against the central Umayyad government at Córdoba in Andalusia (probably not cemented until 729).
- Charles Martel invades Bavaria, and kills Duke Grimoald in battle. His son Hugbert submits to Frankish suzerainty, and Charles brings back the Agilolfing princess Swanachild, who becomes his concubine (later his wife).
- King Liutprand puts Corsica, nominally under Byzantine authority, under Lombard government, defending it from Muslim raids (approximate date).

==== Britain ====
- The exiled prince Ealdbert, possibly a nephew of King Ine of Wessex looking for recognition as his heir, seeks sanctuary in Sussex. Ine attacks the South Saxons and kills Ealdbert.
- April 23 – King Wihtred of Kent dies after a 35-year reign. The kingdom is divided between his three sons: Æthelbert II as overking, Eadbert I in West Kent and Alric.

==== China ====
- Yi Xing, Chinese Buddhist monk and astronomer, applies a clockwork escapement mechanism, to provide rotating motion to his astronomical armillary sphere.

=== By topic ===
==== Literature ====
- Bede, Northumbrian monk-historian, writes The Reckoning of Time (De temporum ratione), explaining how to calculate medieval Easter.

==== Religion ====
- In Egypt, resentment of the Copts against Umayyad taxation (called jizya) leads to a revolt (approximate date).

== Births ==
- Paul the Deacon, Lombard monk (approximate date)
- Stephen the Hymnographer, Syrian monk (d. 807)

== Deaths ==
- April 23 – Wihtred, king of Kent
- Ealdbert, prince of Wessex
- Grimoald, duke of Bavaria
- Gwylog ap Beli, king of Powys
- Nothhelm, king of Sussex
- Ruben of Dairinis, Irish scholar
