= Hiltrud =

Hiltrud (c. 716-754), was a daughter of Charles Martel and Rotrude of Hesbaye. She was a Duchess consort of Bavaria by marriage to Odilo, Duke of Bavaria. She was regent of Bavaria for her minor son Tassilo III, Duke of Bavaria in 748-754.

== Life ==
Hiltrud formed an attachment to Odilo I, Duke of Bavaria, during his stay at Charles Martel’s court in 740. After his departure, Charles Martel’s wife, Swanahild, supported Hiltrud in fleeing to Bavaria to join the Duke, an action that led to armed conflict between Odilo and Hiltrud’s brothers Pippin and Karlomann. She married Odilo I of Bavaria.

=== Regency ===
After the death of Odilo in 748, she became regent for her son Tassilo III.

During her regency, she and Tassilo were held as political prisoners by Gripho, the son of Charles Martel and Swanahild.

She died in 754, when the son turned 13.

Preceded by Biltrude	Duchess of Bavaria; 741–748	Succeeded by Liutperga
