= Hugbert of Bavaria =

Duke of Bavaria

Hugbert (also Hukbert) of the Agilolfings was duke of Bavaria from 725 to 736. He was son of the duke Theudebert and Regintrud, the probable daughter of the Seneschal (and Pfalzgraf) Hugobert and Irmina of Oeren. Hugbert's sister, Guntrud, married Liutprand, later king of the Lombards.

The early death of his father led to a struggle over the succession with his uncle, Grimoald. Charles Martel made use of the situation in order to gain more control over the independent duchy. Grimoald died in 725. Hugbert found himself forced to give up parts of his duchy, and for a time, Bavarian laws were pronounced in the name of the Merovingian king Theuderic IV.

Hugbert started the implementation of his predecessor's plan to create an independent Bavarian church. He did this by having Boniface Christianize the country and by recalling the bishop Korbinian from Freising.

| Preceded by Grimoald | Duke of Bavaria; 725–736 | Succeeded by Odilo |
