= Irmina of Oeren =

Frankish noble

Saint Irmina of Oeren
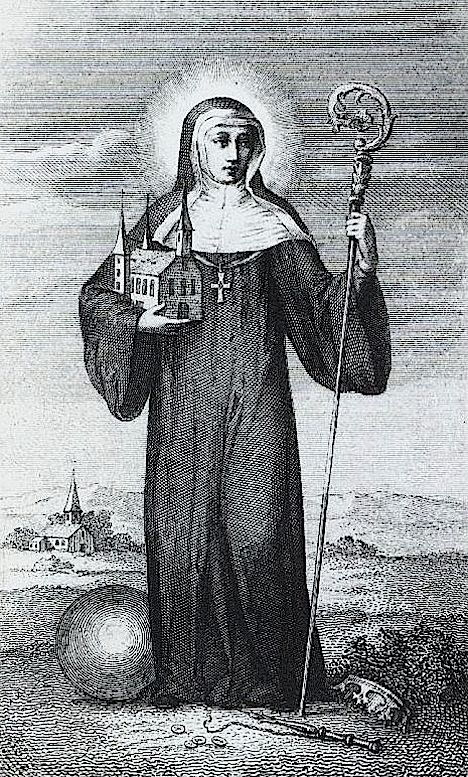
- Residence: Oeren, Trier, Germany
- Died: 720; Wissembourg
- Venerated in: Catholic Church
- Feast: 3 January
- Attributes: Religious habit and crosier of an abbess; church model in her hand, two angels above her head

Irmina of Oeren (also called Ermina and Hirmina; died 720) was a saint, founder and abbess of a convent in Oeren, near Trier (Trèves), and co-founder of a convent in Echternach (now eastern Luxembourg). Hagiographer Basil Watkins states that Irmina's 12th century biography is "unreliable" and it is likely that "legends about her family tree spiralled out of control", but she came from one of the most powerful families in the Merovingian kingdom. She might have been Saint Primina, the daughter of Dagobert I and sister of Saint Modesta. She might have been the daughter of Dagobert II and sister of Saint Adela of Pfalze. Historian Ian Wood stated that Irmina is "traditionally, and probably correctly, identified as Plectrude's mother".

According to many versions of Irmina's biography, when she was fifteen years old, she was engaged to marry a man named Count Hermann, but just before they were to marry, he was killed in a murder-suicide by one of his servants, who "admired Irmina and could not bear that his master should have her".

Irmina then married Hugobert, a magnate from the middle Moselle region, who served as seneschal and was a count of the palace at the Merovingian court during the reigns of Theuderic III and Childebert III. They had several daughters, including:

- Plectrude, 691/717 wife of Pippin of Herstal and founder of the Abbey St. Maria im Kapitol in Cologne
- Adela (655-732), abbess of Pfalzel, married to Eudes I, Duke of Aquitaine (questionable Odo the Great and son of Saint Oda)
- Regintrud, whose second marriage after the death of her husband was to the duke Theudebert of Bavaria
- Irmina (d. ca 704), married to Chariveus, brother of Lambert, Count of Hesbaye.
- Bertrada of Prüm (b. c. 670, d. after 721), the founder of the Prüm Abbey and mother of count Caribert of Laon, who was father of Bertrada of Laon, who in turn was mother of Charlemagne.

After the death of Hugobert, around 697, she built her a monastery at Oeren in Trier, which was eventually named after her, and where she succeeded as abbess her sister, Saint Modesta. Irmina donated lands to help co-found, with Saint Willibrord of Northumberland, the convent in Echternacht in 697 or 698. Historian Jamie Kreiner called the founding of the Echternacht convent "a cooperative venture" between Willibrord and Irmina's family, who later promised to protect the convent and its holdings after Willibrord promised fidelity to them in 706. Watkins reported that Irmina was "generous to both Celtic and Saxon missionary monks". Irmina died in 720 at the monastery at Weissenburg, which was also founded by her father.

Irmina's feast day is December 24. She is the patroness saint of Trevos and is represented with a church in her hand, signifying her status as a church founder, and with two angels above her head, carrying her soul to heaven.

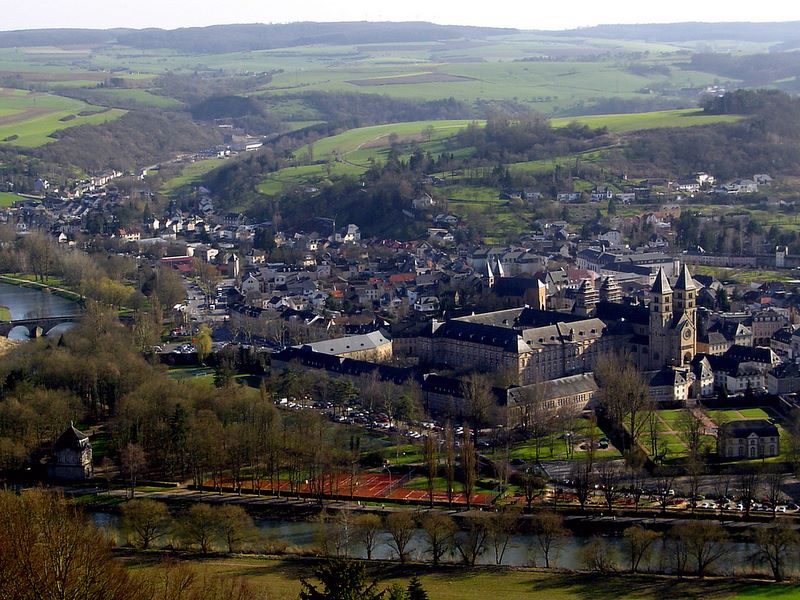
Echternach Abbey in the valley of the river Sauer

== Works cited ==
- Dunbar, Agnes B.C. (1901). A Dictionary of Saintly Women. 1. London: George Bell & Sons. pp. 413–414.
