= Hugobert =

German count

Hugobert (also Chugoberctus or Hociobercthus) (died probably in 697) was a seneschal and a count of the palace at the Merovingian court during the reigns of Theuderic III and Childebert III. He was a grandson of the dux Theotar, and it is assumed, but not proven, that his father was Chugus, who in 617 became mayor of the palace of Austrasia. The juxtaposition of names in the Vita Landiberto episcopi Traiectensis may imply a relationship between him and the family of Saint Lambert (see below).

It has been disproven that he is one and the same with bishop Hugobert of Liège, because his wife appears in the records of Echternach in the year 698 as a widow. He was married to Irmina of Oeren, who, shortly after his death, made possible the founding of the Abbey of Echternach. Irmina was sister to Adela of Pfalzel, founder of the convent Pfalzel, who is frequently confused with her daughter of the same name. He last appears in a royal charter dated 14 March 697.

== Marriage and Family ==
Hugobert and Irmina had several daughters, including:

- Plectrude, 670-717 witnessed, the first wife of Pippin of Herstal 635-714, and founder of the Abbey St. Maria im Kapitol in Cologne
- Adela (655-732), abbess of Pfalzel, married to Eudes I, Duke of Aquitaine 670-735 (questionable Odo the Great)
- Regintrud, b.660/65 whose second marriage after the death of her husband was to the duke Theudebert of Bavaria, 685-718.
- Irmina (d. ca 704), married to Chariveus, brother of Lambert, Count of Hesbaye.

Other children sometimes attributed by genealogists to Hugobert and Irmina include:

- Chrodelinda, who was likely the daughter of Irmina and Chiriveus. She married Wido, Abbot of Saint Wandrile. Their son Warnhar was Count of Horbach and was the patriarch of the Widonids.
- Bertrada of Prüm (b. c. 670, d. after 721), the founder of the Prüm Abbey and mother of count Caribert of Laon, who was father of Bertrada of Laon, who in turn was mother of Charlemagne.

== Relationships with Frankish Nobility ==
Hugobert has been speculated by genealogists to have been ancestor of a number of powerful families of the Frankish nobility, including the Etichonids, Agilofings, Widonids, Carolingians and Robertians/Capetians, as well as the family of William of Gellone. All of these connections are speculative in nature.

== Sources ==
- Settipani, Christian (1990), "Addenda aux "Ancêtres de Charlemagne", 1990" (PDF).
