= Agilulf (disambiguation) =

Agilulf (c. 555–616) was a king of the Lombards. In Italian he is known as Agilulfo.

Agilulf may also refer to:

- Agilulf (bishop of Metz) (c. 537–601), Frankish bishop
- Agilulf (Suebi) (420–after 482), Suebian ruler

== See also ==
- Agilulfo, the protagonist of Italo Calvino's novel The Nonexistent Knight
