= Swanachild =

Frankish queen

Swanachild (also Swanahild or Serenahilt) was the second wife of Charles Martel.

== Reign ==
Swanachild belonged to the clan of the Agilolfing, though her parentage is not quite clear. Her parents could be Tassilo II, duke of Bavaria, and his wife Imma. Alternatively, her parents could be Theudebert of Bavaria, duke of Bavaria and his wife Regintrud.

In the 720s Charles Martel married Swanachild. After an initial conflict, Martel established amicable relations with Bavaria.

The Reichenau Codex listed her as Suanahil regina.

With Martel she had one child, Grifo. After the death of Martel, she supported her son's failed attempt to gain a portion of his inheritance. This she did with the support of her uncle Odilo of Bavaria. Afterwards she was relegated to the position of abbess of Chelles Abbey.
