= 807 =

Calendar year

807 in various calendars
Gregorian calendar	807; DCCCVII
Ab urbe condita	1560
Armenian calendar	256; ԹՎ ՄԾԶ
Assyrian calendar	5557
Balinese saka calendar	728–729
Bengali calendar	213–214
Berber calendar	1757
Buddhist calendar	1351
Burmese calendar	169
Byzantine calendar	6315–6316
Chinese calendar	丙戌年 (Fire Dog); 3504 or 3297 — to — 丁亥年 (Fire Pig); 3505 or 3298
Coptic calendar	523–524
Discordian calendar	1973
Ethiopian calendar	799–800
Hebrew calendar	4567–4568
- Hindu calendars
Vikram Samvat	863–864
Shaka Samvat	728–729
Kali Yuga	3907–3908
Holocene calendar	10807
Iranian calendar	185–186
Islamic calendar	191–192
Japanese calendar	Daidō 2 (大同２年)
Javanese calendar	703–704
Julian calendar	807; DCCCVII
Korean calendar	3140
Minguo calendar	1105 before ROC 民前1105年
Nanakshahi calendar	−661
Seleucid era	1118/1119 AG
Thai solar calendar	1349–1350
Tibetan calendar	མེ་ཕོ་ཁྱི་ལོ་ (male Fire-Dog); 933 or 552 or −220 — to — མེ་མོ་ཕག་ལོ་ (female Fire-Boar); 934 or 553 or −219

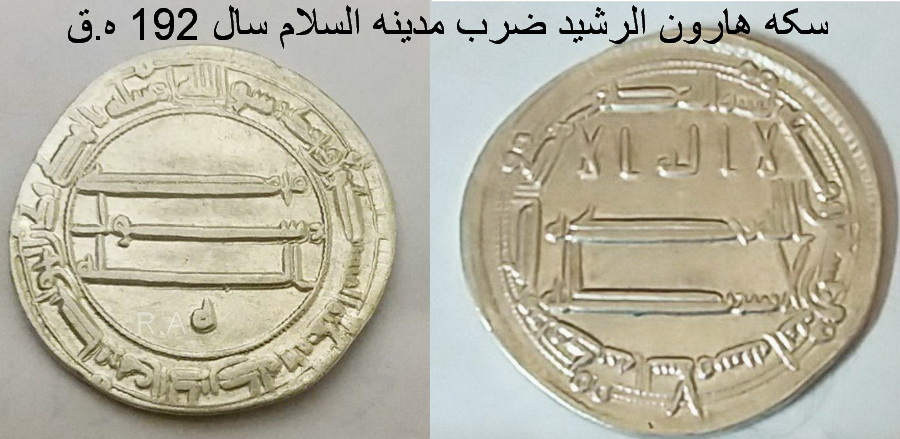
Dirham of Harun al-Rashid 192 AH/807 CE, Baghdad

Year 807 (DCCCVII) was a common year starting on Friday of the Julian calendar, the 807th year of the Common Era (CE) and Anno Domini (AD) designations, the 807th year of the 1st millennium, the 7th year of the 9th century, and the 8th year of the 800s decade.

== Events ==
=== By place ===
==== Abbasid Empire and Byzantine Empire ====
- Emperor Nikephoros I is forced to sue for peace, on condition of paying 50,000 nomismata to Caliph Harun al-Rashid, and agrees to a yearly tribute. Nikephoros promises not to rebuild the dismantled forts. Rashid recalls his forces from various sieges, and evacuates Byzantine territory.

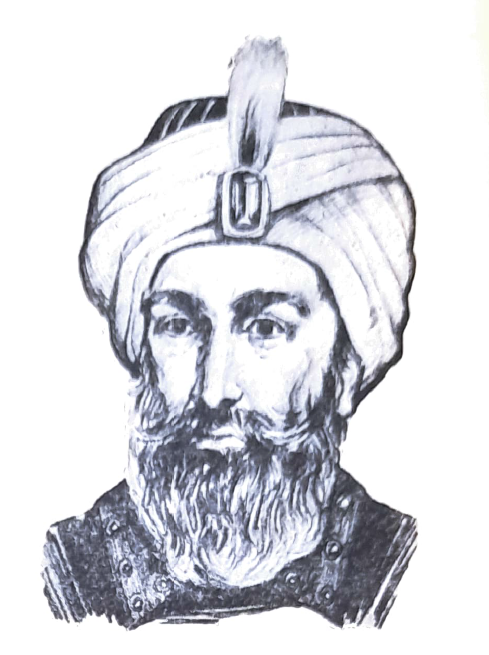
Harun al-Rashid (r. 786–809) the Commander-in-chief and caliph of the Abbasid Caliphate. He was the Arab leader of the Caliphate–Byzantine wars in the late 8th and early 9th century.

- An Abbasid fleet under Humayd ibn Ma'yuf al-Hajuri raids the Peloponnese, Rhodes and Myra.

==== Europe ====
- Al-Andalus (modern Spain): An uprising occurs in the city of Mérida against the Umayyad Emirate of Córdoba.
- Siege of Patras: This marks the end of independent rule by the South Slavs in the Peloponnese (or 805).

==== Britain ====
- The Vikings land on the Cornish coast, and form an alliance with the Cornish to fight against Wessex.

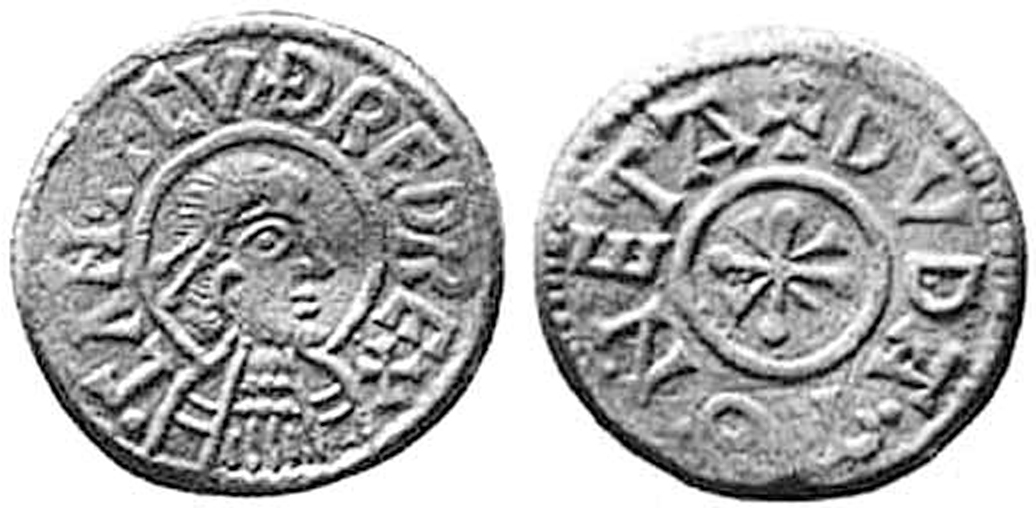
Coin of king Cuthred of Kent (798–807)

- King Cuthred of Kent dies. His brother, King Coenwulf of Mercia, takes control over Kent himself.

==== Asia ====
- Dappula II becomes king of Sri Lanka, and makes Anuradhapura the capital city.
- Li Jifu is appointed chancellor, during the reign of Emperor Xian Zong in China.

=== By topic ===
==== Religion ====
- The Temple of Motoyama-ji in Mitoyo (Japan), of the Kōyasan Shingon-shū sect, is constructed by the orders of Emperor Heizei.
- The Jame' Atiq Mosque of Qazvin is constructed in Qazvin (modern Iran), by the orders of Harun al-Rashid.
- The Book of Armagh is written by the Irish illuminator Ferdomnach, a scribe at the School of Armagh.

== Births ==
- Dongshan Liangjie, Chinese Buddhist teacher (d. 869)

== Deaths ==
- October 13 – Simpert, bishop of Augsburg
- Conall mac Taidg, king of the Picts (approximate date)
- Cuthred, king of Kent
- Robert II, Frankish nobleman (approximate date)
- Stephen the Hymnographer, Syrian monk (b. 725)
- Widukind, duke of Saxony (approximate date)
