= Regintrud =

7th c Bavarian Duchess

Regintrud, also known as Reginlind and Regentrud, (born 660–665, died 730–740) was probably the wife of Duke Theodbert of Bavaria or of his father Duke Theodo of Bavaria. A possibly identical Regintrud became abbess of Nonnberg Abbey in 720–725. However, details about her ancestry and life are widely disputed among historians.

According to differing views, Regintrud was either a daughter of King Dagobert I, or of Pfalzgraf Hugobert and Irmina of Oeren, or of Childebert III.

== Issue ==
Assuming she was married with Theudebert of Bavaria, her children from this marriage were:

- Hugbert of Bavaria, heir to the duchy
- Guntrud, wife of Liutprand

Historians researched inconclusive evidence about further children, such as a daughter named Pilitrud from a previous marriage with an unknown husband. Tassilo II and Swanachild are also suggested as children from her marriage with Theudebert.
