= 869 =

Calendar year

869 in various calendars
- Gregorian calendar: 869; DCCCLXIX
- Ab urbe condita: 1622
- Armenian calendar: 318; ԹՎ ՅԺԸ
- Assyrian calendar: 5619
- Balinese saka calendar: 790–791
- Bengali calendar: 275–276
- Berber calendar: 1819
- Buddhist calendar: 1413
- Burmese calendar: 231
- Byzantine calendar: 6377–6378
- Chinese calendar: 戊子年 (Earth Rat); 3566 or 3359 — to — 己丑年 (Earth Ox); 3567 or 3360
- Coptic calendar: 585–586
- Discordian calendar: 2035
- Ethiopian calendar: 861–862
- Hebrew calendar: 4629–4630
- Hindu calendars
- Vikram Samvat: 925–926
- Shaka Samvat: 790–791
- Kali Yuga: 3969–3970
- Holocene calendar: 10869
- Iranian calendar: 247–248
- Islamic calendar: 255–256
- Japanese calendar: Jōgan 11 (貞観１１年)
- Javanese calendar: 766–767
- Julian calendar: 869; DCCCLXIX
- Korean calendar: 3202
- Minguo calendar: 1043 before ROC 民前1043年
- Nanakshahi calendar: −599
- Seleucid era: 1180/1181 AG
- Thai solar calendar: 1411–1412
- Tibetan calendar: ས་ཕོ་བྱི་བ་ལོ་ (male Earth-Rat); 995 or 614 or −158 — to — ས་མོ་གླང་ལོ་ (female Earth-Ox); 996 or 615 or −157

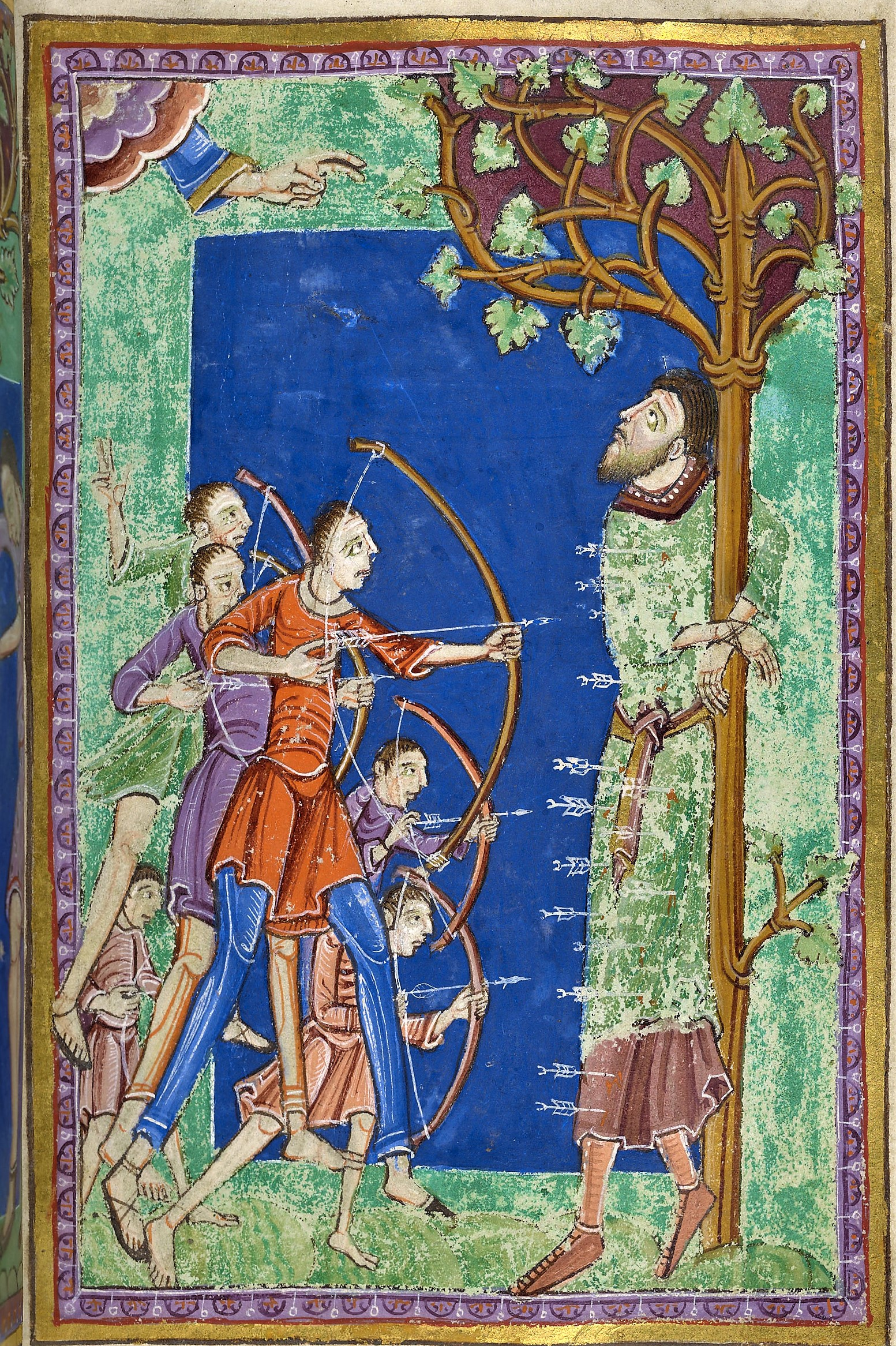
Death of king Edmund the Martyr (right)

Year 869 (DCCCLXIX) was a common year starting on Saturday of the Julian calendar.

== Events ==
=== By place ===
==== Byzantine Empire ====
- Summer – Emperor Basil I allies with the Frankish emperor Louis II against the Saracens. He sends a Byzantine fleet of 400 ships (according to the Annales Bertiniani), under the command of Admiral Niketas Ooryphas, to support Louis (who is besieging the city port of Bari) and to clear the south of the Adriatic Sea of Muslim raiders.
- The Hagia Sophia Basilica (church) in Constantinople suffers great damage during an earthquake, which makes the eastern half-dome collapse. Basil I orders it to be repaired.

==== Europe ====
- August 8 – Lothair II, King of Middle Francia (Lotharingia), dies at Piacenza, on his way home from meeting Pope Adrian II at Rome, to get assent for a divorce. Lotharingia is subsequently divided between Lothair's uncles, Charles the Bald of France and Louis the German.

==== Britain ====
- The Danes, led by Viking chieftain Ivar the Boneless, 'make peace' with the Mercians (by accepting Danegeld). Ivar leaves Nottingham on horseback, and returns to York.
- Autumn –The Great Heathen Army, led by Ivar the Boneless and Ubba, invades the Kingdom of East Anglia and plunders Peterborough. The Vikings take up winter quarters at Thetford.
- November 20 – Vikings conquer East Anglia, killing King Edmund the Martyr.

==== Arabian Empire ====
- The Zanj Rebellion: The Zanj (black slaves from East Africa), provoked by mercilessly harsh labor conditions in salt flats, and on the sugar and cotton plantations of southwestern Persia, revolt.
- Summer – Caliph Al-Mu'tazz is murdered by mutinous Muslim troops, after a 3-year reign. He is succeeded by Al-Muhtadi (a grandson of the late Al-Mu'tasim), as ruler of the Abbasid Caliphate.

==== Japan ====
- July 9 – The 869 Sanriku earthquake and associated tsunami devastate a large part of the Sanriku coast on the northeastern side of the island of Honshu.
- The first Gion Festival is held in order to combat an epidemic thought to be caused by an angry deity.

==== Mesoamerica ====
- The last monument ever erected at Tikal, Stela 11, is dedicated by ruler (ajaw) Jasaw Chan Kʼawiil II.

=== By topic ===
==== Religion ====
- October 5 – The Fourth Council of Constantinople, called by Basil I and Pope Adrian II, opens. The council will condemn Photius I and depose him as patriarch, reinstating his predecessor Ignatios.

== Births ==
- January 2 – Yōzei, emperor of Japan (d. 949)
- Gung Ye, king of Hu Goguryeo (approximate date)
- Muhammad al-Mahdi, Muslim Twelver Shī‘ah Imām

== Deaths ==
- February 14 – Cyril, Byzantine missionary and bishop
- August 8 – Lothair II, king of Lotharingia (b. c.837)
- September 8 – Ahmad ibn Isra'il al-Anbari, Muslim vizier
- September 18 – Wenilo, Frankish archbishop
- October 14 – Pang Xun, Chinese rebel leader
- November 20 (or 870) – Edmund the Martyr, king of East Anglia
- Al-Darimi, Muslim scholar and imam
- Al-Hakim al-Tirmidhi, Muslim jurist (approximate date)
- Al-Jahiz, Afro-Muslim scholar and writer (or 868)
- Al-Mu'tazz, Muslim caliph (b. 847)
- Dongshan Liangjie, Chinese Buddhist teacher (b. 807)
- Dúnlaing mac Muiredaig, king of Leinster (Ireland)
- Ermentrude of Orléans, queen of the Franks (b. 823)
- Gundachar, count (or margrave) of Carinthia
- Leuthard II, Frankish count (or 858)
- Rothad of Soissons, Frankish bishop
- Shapur ibn Sahl, Persian physician
- Solomon, Frankish count (approximate date)
- Yu Xuanji, Chinese poet (or 868)
