= Theodo of Bavaria =

Duke of Bavaria

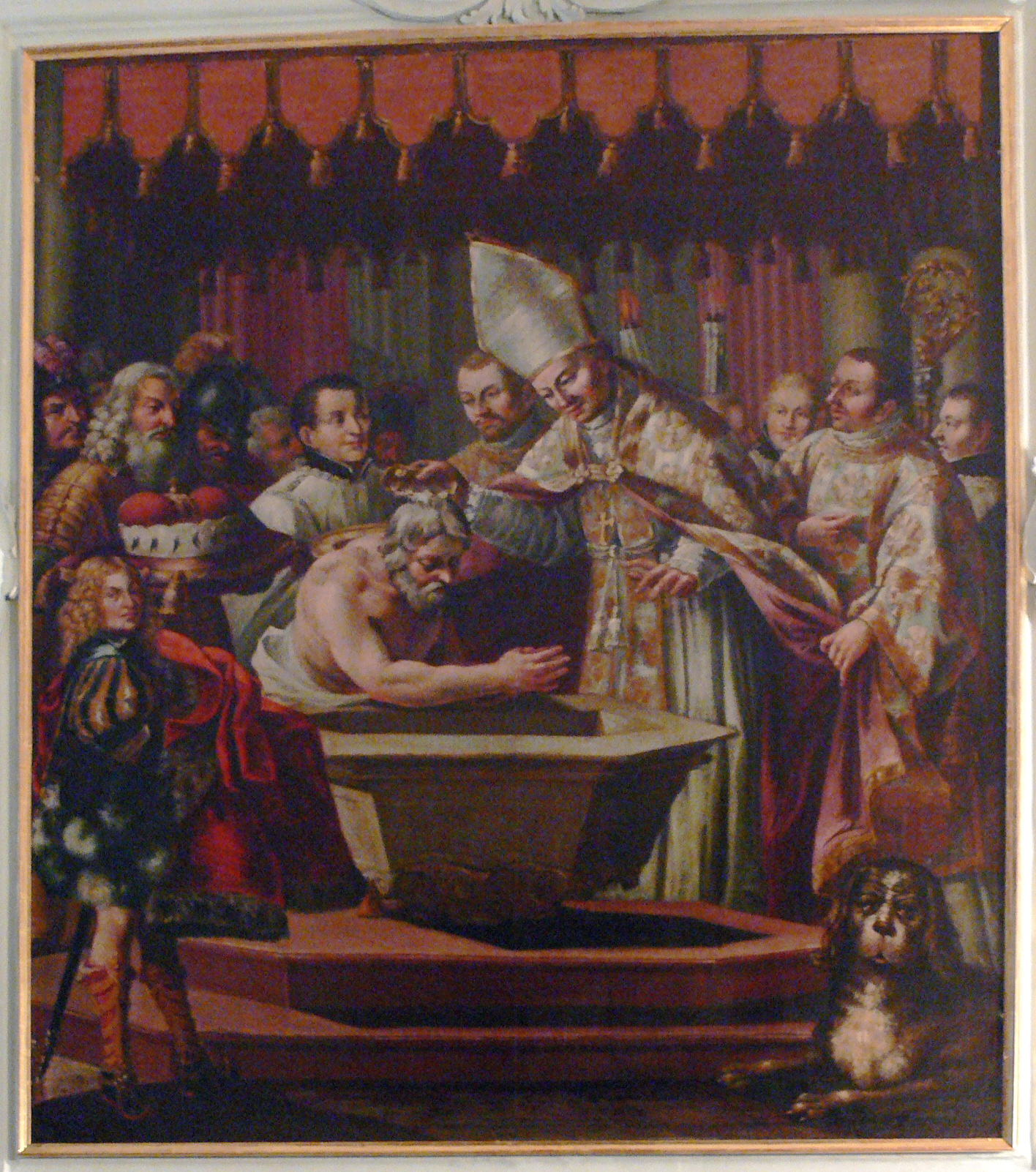
Baptism of Duke Theodo by Bishop Rupert of Salzburg, St Peter's Abbey, Salzburg

Theodo or Theoto (about 625 – 11 December c. 716), sometimes numbered Theodo II, was the Duke of Bavaria from 670 or, more likely, 680 to his death. It is with Theodo that the well-sourced history of Bavaria begins. He strengthened the duchy internally and externally and, according to the medieval chronicler Arbeo of Freising, he was a ruler of great power whose fame extended beyond his borders.

== Life ==
Theodo's descendance has not been conclusively established. A member of the Agilolfing dynasty, his father was possibly Duke Theodo IV of Bavaria (d. 680) and his mother was probably Fara of Bavaria (b. 600), daughter of one of the Kings of the Lombards and by her mother a granddaughter of Gisulf I of Friuli (b. 577).

Theodo established his capital at Ratisbona (modern Regensburg). He married Folchaid, of the Frankish (possibly Robertian as the daughter of Robert II) aristocracy in Austrasia, to build diplomatic ties there. He intervened in Lombard affairs by harbouring the refugees Ansprand and Liutprand, whom he assisted militarily on his return to claim the Iron Crown. Liutprand later married his daughter Guntrude. Theodo also defended his duchy ably from the Avars (with some failure in the east).

Theodo is the patron to the four great missionaries of Bavaria: Saint Rupert, Saint Erhard, Saint Emmeram, and probably Saint Corbinian. He was the first to draw up plans for the Bavarian church, aiming both at a deeper cultivation of the countryside as well as greater independence from the Frankish Kingdom by a closer association with the Pope. In 716, he was the first Bavarian duke to travel to Rome, where he conferred with Pope Gregory II. The diocesan seats were placed in the few urban centres, which served as the Duke's seats: Regensburg, Salzburg, Freising and Passau.

Two of his children are involved with the death of Saint Emmeram. Theodo's daughter Uta had become pregnant by her lover. Fearing her father's wrath, she confided to Emmeram and the saint promised to bear the blame, as he was about to travel to Rome. Soon after his departure, Uta's predicament became known and in keeping with the agreement she named Emmeram as the father. Her brother Lantpert went after Emmeram and greeted him as "bishop and brother-in-law," i.e., episcope et gener noster! Then he had Emmeram cut and torn into pieces. Theodo had the remains of the saint moved to Regensburg. Nothing more is known of Lantpert and Uta.

== Marriage and issue ==
According to the Renaissance historians Ladislaus Sunthaym (c.1440–1512/13) and Johannes Aventinus (1477–1534), Theodo married Regintrud, possibly a daughter of King Dagobert I of Austrasia. However, the Verbrüderungsbuch codex of St Peter's Abbey, Salzburg only mentions one Folchaid, probably a daughter of the Robertian count Theutacar in Wormsgau. They had the following children:

- Theodbert, Duke of Bavaria in Salzburg 711/12–c.719
- Theobald, Duke of Bavaria in Regensburg c.711/12–717/19
- Tassilo II, Duke of Bavaria in Passau (?) 717–719
- Grimoald, Duke of Bavaria in Freising c.716–724
- Guntrude - married Liutprand, King of the Lombards
- a daughter who married her Agilolfing cousin Duke Gotfrid of Alamannia

From another wife named Gleisnot of Friuli:

- Lantpert of Bavaria
- Uta.

Theodo was eventually succeeded by his four other sons, between whom he divided his duchy sometime before 715. As early as 702, his eldest son Theodbert had been reigning from Salzburg and from 711 or 712 was the co-ruler of his father. It is impossible to see if this division was territorial (as with the Merovingians) or purely a co-regency (as with the later princes of Benevento and Capua). If so, Theodbert's capital was probably Salzburg and the Vita Corbiniani informs that Grimoald had his seat in Freising. References to Theobald and the Thuringii implies perhaps a capital at Regensburg and this leaves Tassilo at Passau. All of this is educated conjecture.

== Ordinals ==
Some historians have distinguished between a Duke Theodo I, ruling around 680, and a Duke Theodo II, reigning in the early eighth century. Theodo I is associated with events involving Saint Emmeram, Uta and Lantpert, while Theodo II is associated with Saints Corbinian and Rupert, the ecclesiastical organisation and the division of the Duchy. However, no contemporary source indicates a distinction between different Dukes of that name.

To complicate matters even further, Bavarian tradition has referred to Theodo I and Theodo II as Theodo IV and Theodo V respectively to differentiate them from legendary Agilolfing ancestors Theodo I to III, all who would have reigned before 550.

== Sources ==
- Die Genealogie der Franken und Frankreichs
- Vita of St Robert

Preceded by (3 generations before); Garibald II	Duke of Bavaria; 680–716	Succeeded by Theodbert; Theobald; Tassilo II; Grimoald
