= Agilolfings =

Bavarian noble family

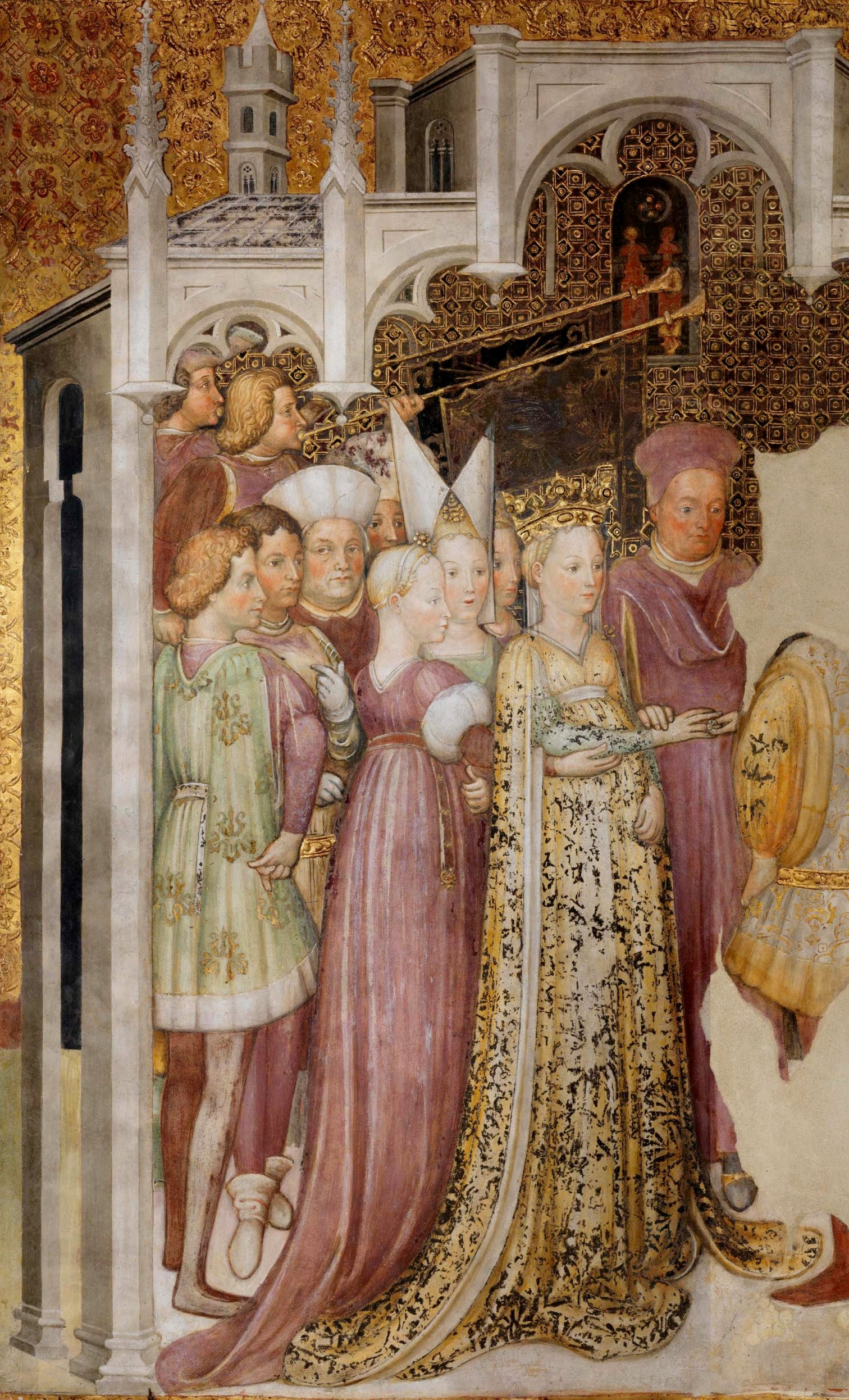
Theodelinda (c. 570–628), the daughter of Garibald I, fresco by Zavattari

The Agilolfings were a noble family that ruled the Duchy of Bavaria on behalf of their Merovingian suzerains from about 550 until 788. A cadet branch of the Agilolfings also ruled the Kingdom of the Lombards intermittently from 616 to 712. They are mentioned as the leading dynasty in the Lex Baiuvariorum (c. 743). Their Bavarian residence was at Regensburg.

The dynasty's eponymous ancestor is Agilulf, a semi-legendary prince of the Suebi and descendant of Hermeric, the 5th-century Suevic king of Galicia, possibly identical with one Agilulf, a steward of the Visigothic king Theoderic II, who was executed in 457.

The first duke identified with the Agilolfing line in German historiography is Garibald I (Gariwald). However, doubt has been cast on Garibald's membership in the Agilolfing family in modern scholarship, which makes Tassilo I (r. 591–610) the first ascertained member of the dynasty.

The Agilolfings had close ties to the Merovingians. Garibald I himself married Waldrada, the widow of Merovingian king Theudebald, in 555, after her marriage to Chlothar I was annulled on grounds of consanguinity. As they had their fate intertwined with the Merovingian dynasty, they opposed the rise of the Carolingian mayors of the palace, who finally deprived the Agilolfings of their power.

== Rulers of Bavaria ==
- Garibald I, Duke of Bavaria 548–591
- Tassilo I, King of Bavaria 591–610
- Garibald II, Duke of Bavaria 610–630
- Theodo, Duke of Bavaria 680–716
- Lantpert, son of Theodo, murderer of Emmeram of Regensburg
- Uta, daughter of Theodo
- Theodbert, son of Theodo, Duke in Salzburg c. 702–719
- Theobald, son of Theodo, Duke of parts of Bavaria c. 711–719
- Tassilo II, son of Theodo, Duke in Passau c. 716–719
- Grimoald, son of Theodo, Duke in Freising c. 716–725, later ruling all of Bavaria
- Hugbert, son of Theudbert, Duke of Bavaria 725–737
- Odilo, son of Gotfried of Allemania, Duke of Bavaria 737–748
- Grifo, 748 (half-Carolingian usurper)
- Tassilo III, son of Odilo, Duke of Bavaria 748–788, deposed by Charlemagne
- Theodo, son of Tassilo III, became a monk

== Rulers of Italy ==
- Gundoald, Duke of Asti, son of Garibald I
- Theodelinda, daughter of Garibald I of Bavaria, Queen of the Lombards
- Adaloald, son of Theodelinda and Agilulf, King of the Lombards 616 to 626
- Gundeberga, daughter of Agilulf and Theodelinda, married King Arioald
- Aripert I, son of Gundoald, King of the Lombards 653–661
- Godepert, eldest son of Aripert, King of the Lombards 661–662 jointly with
- Berthari, younger son of Aripert, King of the Lombards 661–662 and 672–688
- Cunincpert, son of Berthari, King of the Lombards 688–700
- Liutpert, son of Cunincpert, King of the Lombards 700–701
- Raginpert, son of Godepert, King of the Lombards 701
- Aripert II, son of Raginpert, King of the Lombards 701–712

== At the Austrasian court ==
- Chrodoald, nobleman at the court of Dagobert I, killed in 624
- Fara, opponent to Sigebert III
