= Tassilo II of Bavaria =

Tassilo II (c. 690 – c. 719) was a ruler in southern Germany.

He was the son, probably third, of Theodo of Bavaria and Folchaid. Sometime before 715, Theodo divided his duchy and associated with its rule the eldest two of his four sons. The eldest, Theodbert, was co-ruling as early as 702 and the second, Theobald, from 711. On Theodo's death (probably in 716), the division took full effect. It is not known if the division was territorial (as with the Merovingians) or purely a co-regency (as with the later princes of Benevento and Capua). If the former, it seems to have followed the fourfold ecclesiastic division into dioceses which Theodo had effected. If that is the case, it is most probable that Tassilo ruled the diocese of Passau with his capital there at its see.

War broke out between the brothers soon after their father's death, but few details are known. About Tassilo's time as duke, next to nothing is known. His existence is confirmed in the "Codex of Salzburg" (Salzburger Verbrüderungsbuch) where he is listed as unmarried, though some surmise that a certain Waldrada, mentioned as a wife of Theobald, was in fact Tassilo's. On the other hand, he is identified as the husband of Imma (d. c. 750), by whom he had Grimoald and Swanachild. Through Swanachild, Tassilo would be the father-in-law of Charles Martel. Because Swanachild is with certainty the niece of duke Odilo, one would be forced to assume that Odilo was brother or brother-in-law to Tassilo. Tassilo was dead by 719, as were all his brothers save Grimoald.

== Sources ==
- Lexikon des Mittelalters

Preceded by Theodo	Duke of Bavaria c.716 – c.719	Succeeded by Grimoald
