= Lantpert of Bavaria =

Lantpert (or Landbert or Landfried) (born before 636, died after 680) was the son of Theodo, duke of Bavaria, and Gleisnot of Friuli.

According to the Vita Hamhrammi by Arbeo, bishop of Freising, Lantpert is the murderer of the Saint Emmeram .

Emmeram had been a guest of the ducal court for three years, where he was known for his chaste and pure lifestyle. Uta, daughter of Duke Theodo and sister to Lantpert, had become pregnant by her lover. Fearing her father's wrath, she confided to Emmeram and the saint promised bear the blame, as he was about to travel to Rome.

Soon after his departure, Uta's predicament became known and in keeping with the agreement she named Emmeram the father. Lantpert went after Emmeram and greeted him as "bishop and brother-in-law" (Aie, episcope et gener noster!) Then he had Emmeram cut and torn into pieces.

Nothing more is known of Lantpert and his sister Uta. Lantpert's deed might be the cause for the Lex Baiuvariorum's unique penalty for killing a bishop: a leaden copy of the corpse was weighed with gold.
