= Corbinian =

Frankish bishop

Saint Corbinian
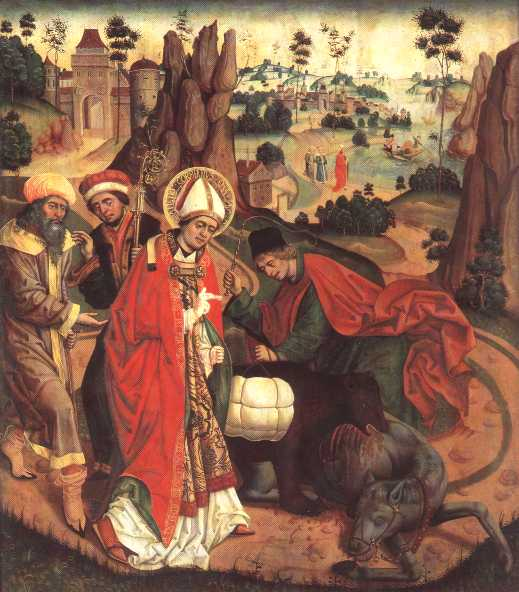
- Saint Corbinian depicted in The Miracle of the Bear (1489) by Jan Polack, Diocesan Museum in Freising, Germany.

Bishop Apostle of the Bavarians
- Born: c. 670; Châtres, Neustria (now France)
- Died: 8 September c. 730; Freising, Kingdom of the Franks (now Germany)
- Venerated in: Roman Catholic Church; Eastern Orthodox Church
- Feast: 8 September
- Attributes: Bear; bishop making a bear carry his luggage because it has eaten his mule; bishop with a bear and mule in the background; bishop with Duke Grimoald of Bavaria at his feet
- Patronage: Freising, Germany; archdiocese of Munich and Freising, Germany

Saint Corbinian (Latin: Corbinianus; French: Corbinien; German: Korbinian; c. 670 – 8 September c. 730) was a Frankish bishop. After living as a hermit near Chartres for fourteen years, he made a pilgrimage to Rome. Pope Gregory II sent him to Bavaria. His opposition to the marriage of Duke Grimoald of Bavaria to his brother's widow, Biltrudis, caused Corbinian to go into exile for a time. His feast day is 8 September. The commemoration of the translation of his relics is on 20 November.

== Life ==
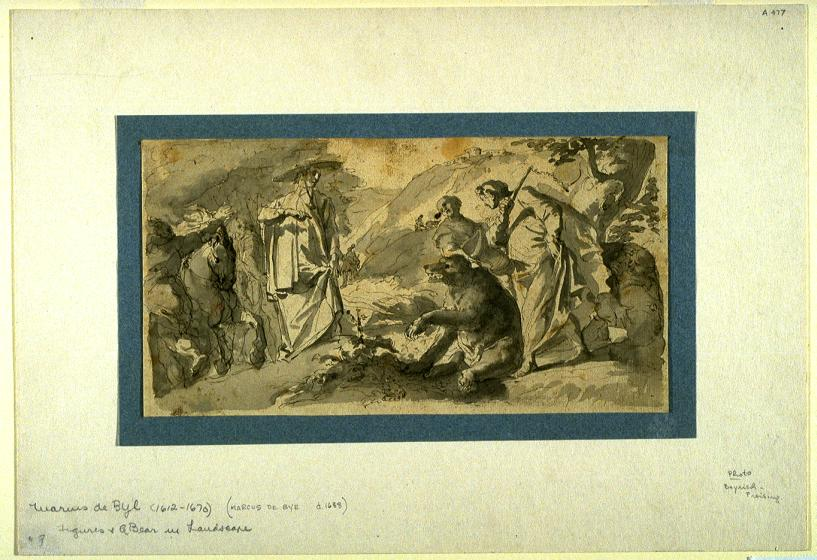
Saint Corbinian of Freising and the Bear, by Cosmas Damian Asam, c. 1725

Corbinian was born and baptised as Waldegiso at Châtres, near Melun, in Frankish territory. He was named after his father, who may have died when Corbinian was an infant. Soon after his father's death, his mother Corbiniana renamed Waldegiso to "Corbinian", after herself. Nothing else is known of his childhood. The early source for Corbinian's life is the Vita Corbiniani of Bishop Arbeo of Freising.

He lived in Châtres on the road to Orléans as a hermit for fourteen years, near a church dedicated to Saint Germain. His reputation attracted students to him, which distracted him from his hermitage. His devotion to Saint Peter the Apostle prompted a decision to make a journey to Rome, accompanied by some of the disciples. While in Rome, Pope Gregory II admonished him to use his talents to evangelise Bavaria. Corbinian, who may already have been a bishop or who was so consecrated by Gregory, was sent to minister to Grimoald, the Frankish Duke of Bavaria. Corbinian probably arrived in Bavaria in 724.

On a mountain near Freising, where there was already a sanctuary, the saint erected a Benedictine monastery and a school which, after his death, came to be governed by his brother Erembert. The monastery was dedicated to Saint Vitus and later, Saint Stephen, before becoming Weihenstephan Abbey in the 11th century.

In 738, when Saint Boniface regulated the ecclesial structure in the Duchy of Bavaria by creating four dioceses to be governed by the archbishop of Mainz, Erembert was chosen first Bishop of Freising.

Soon after settling, Corbinian denounced Grimoald's marriage to his brother's widow, Biltrudis, though Grimoald had already repented of his incest. This incited his anger and the chagrin of his wife, who excoriated Corbinian, labeling him a foreign interloper. Finally, she arranged to have him murdered. Corbinian fled Freising until Grimoald was killed and Biltrudis carried off by invaders in 725. Corbinian returned on the invitation of Grimoald's successor, Huebert, and continued his apostolic labors at Freising until his own death in 730.

Corbinian's body, buried at Merano, was translated to Freising in 769 by the aforementioned Bishop Arbeo, author of Corbinian's vita, and is now entombed in Freising Cathedral.

== Corbinian's bear ==
Corbinian's symbol is the saddled bear. According to his hagiography, a bear killed Corbinian's pack horse on the way to Rome and so the saint commanded it to carry his load. Once he arrived in Rome, however, he let the bear go, and it lumbered back to its native forest. Both the heraldic element and the legend itself carry significant symbolism. One interpretation is that the bear tamed by God's grace is the Bishop of Freising himself and the pack saddle is the burden of his episcopate. The bear's submission and retreat can also be interpreted as Christianity's "taming" and "domestication" of the ferocity of paganism and, consequentially, the laying of a "[foundation] for a great civilization in the Duchy of Bavaria."

=== In Catholic iconography ===
Papal Arms of Pope Benedict XVI

Corbinian's Bear is used as the symbol of Freising in both civic and ecclesiastical heraldry. It appeared on the arms of Pope Benedict XVI, who first adopted the symbol when still known as Joseph Ratzinger, he was appointed Archbishop of Freising-Munich in March 1977. He retained the bear in his revised coat of arms when he was elevated to Cardinal in June of the same year, and again on his papal coat of arms when he was elected in 2005.

The scallop shell is a traditional reference to pilgrimage. For Pope Benedict XVI, it also reminded him of the legend according to which one day St. Augustine, pondering the mystery of the Trinity, saw a child at the seashore playing with a shell, trying to put the water of the ocean into a little hole. Then he heard the words: This hole can no more contain the waters of the ocean than your intellect can comprehend the mystery of God. The crowned Moor is a regional motif in heraldry often seen in Bavaria, Benedict's German homeland. Benedict has been quoted saying that, in addition to the obvious reference back to Saint Corbinian, the founder of the diocese where Benedict would become bishop in 1977, the bear represents Benedict himself being "tamed by God" to bear the spiritual burdens of Benedict's own ministries first as bishop, then as cardinal, and now as pope.

== Gallery ==
Scenes from the life of Saint Corbinian from a panel in the crypt of Freising Cathedral.

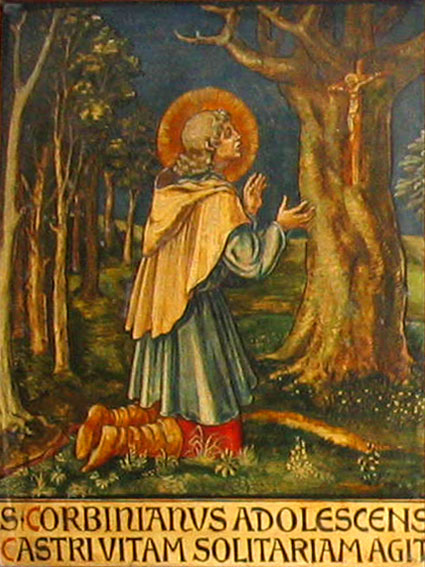
S. Corbinianus adolescens - Castri vitam solitariam agit - Saint Corbinian as a young man decides upon a life of holy solitude

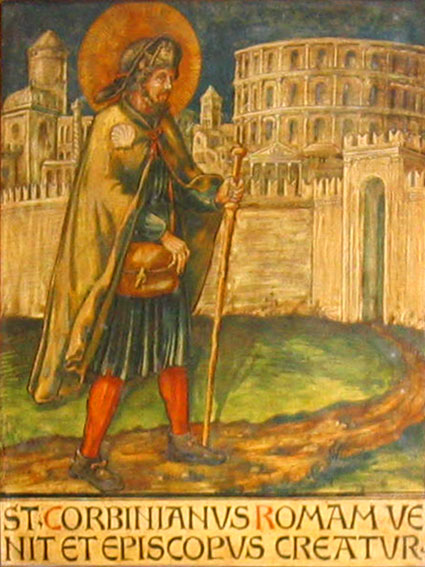
St. Corbinianus Romam venit et episcopus creatur - Saint Corbinian travels to Rome and is created a bishop

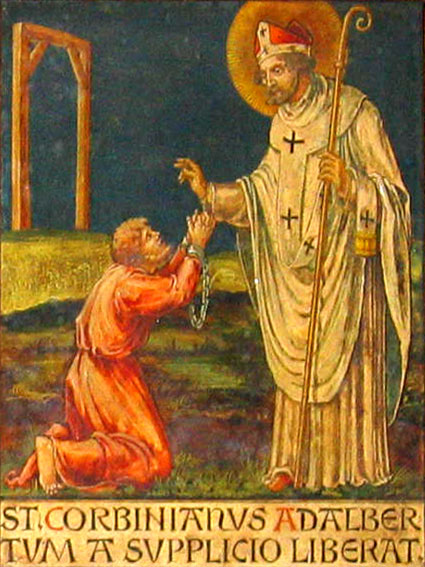
St. Corbinianus Adalbertum a supplicio liberat - Saint Corbinian frees Adalbert at his humble entreaty

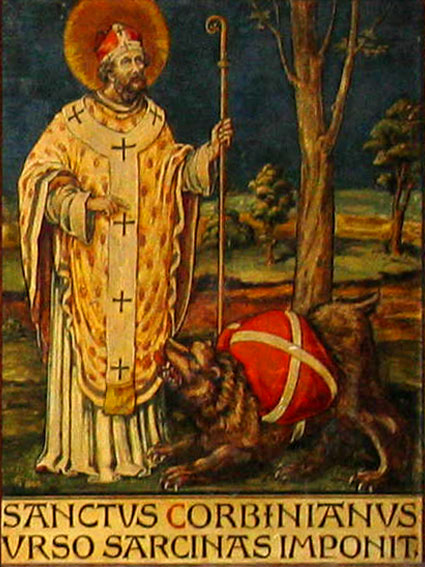
Sanctus Corbinianus urso sarcinas imponit - Saint Corbinian commands the bear to carry his luggage

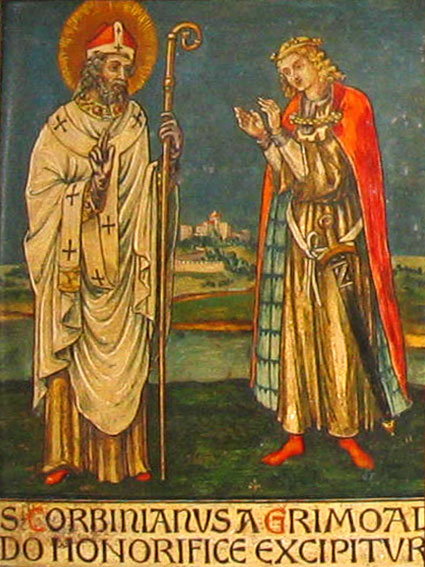
S. Corbinianus a Grimoaldo honorifice excipitur - Saint Corbinian respectfully received by Grimoald

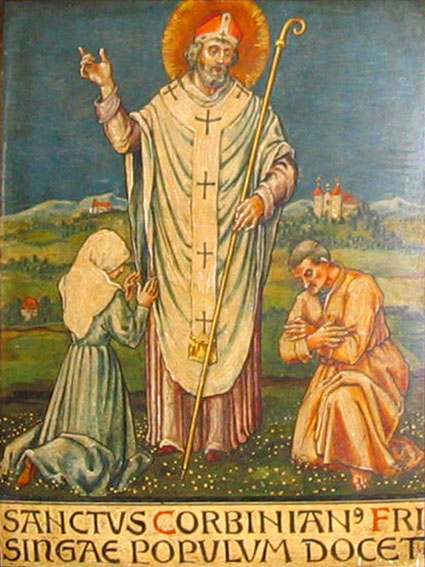
Sanctus Corbinian' Frisingae populum docet - Saint Corbinian teaches the people of Freising

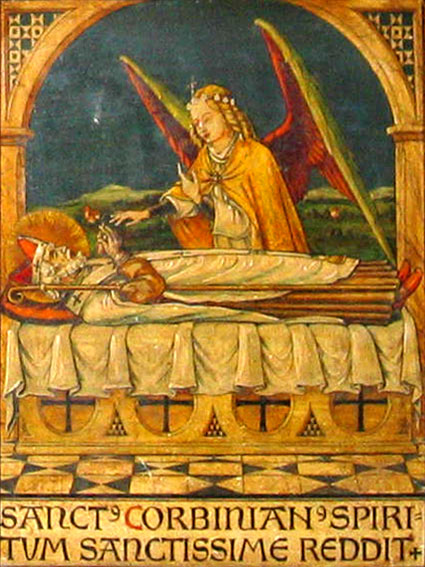
Sanct' Corbinian' spiritum sanctissime reddit - Saint Corbinian solemnly gives up his spirit

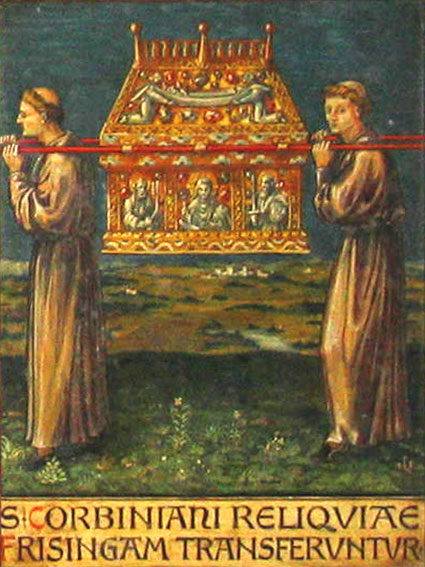
S. Corbiniani reliquiae Frisingam transferuntur - The relics of Saint Corbinian are transferred to Freising
