= St. Maria im Kapitol =

11th-century Romanesque church in Cologne, Germany

Coordinates: 50°56′5″N 6°57′31″E

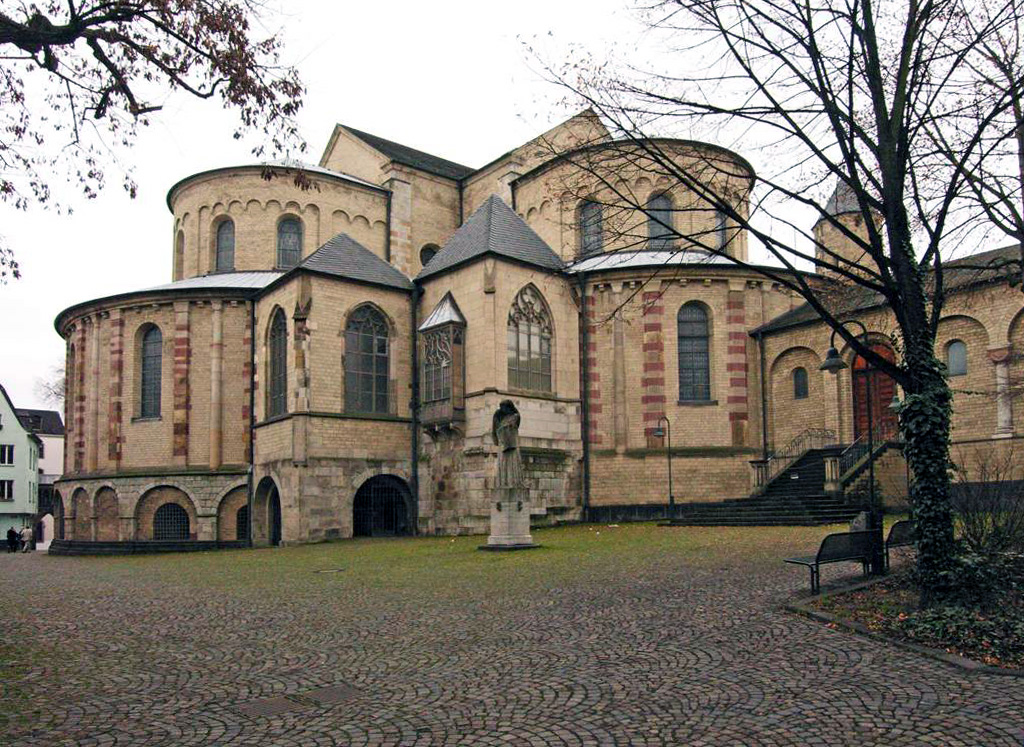
Exterior view east side

St. Maria im Kapitol (St. Mary's in the Capitol) is an 11th-century Romanesque church located in the Kapitol-Viertel in the old town of Cologne, Germany. The name “im Kapitol“ refers to the Roman temple for the Capitoline Triad that was built on today’s site of the church in the first century. The Catholic church is based on the Church of the Nativity in Bethlehem, was dedicated to St. Mary and built between 1040 and 1065. It is one of Twelve Romanesque churches of Cologne.

Measuring 100 m x 40 m and encompassing 4,000 square metres of internal space, St. Maria is the largest of the Romanesque churches in Cologne. Like many of the latter, it has an east end which is trefoil in shape, with three apses. It has a nave and aisles and three towers to the west. It is considered the most important work of German church architecture of the Salian dynasty, besides Speyer Cathedral.

== History ==
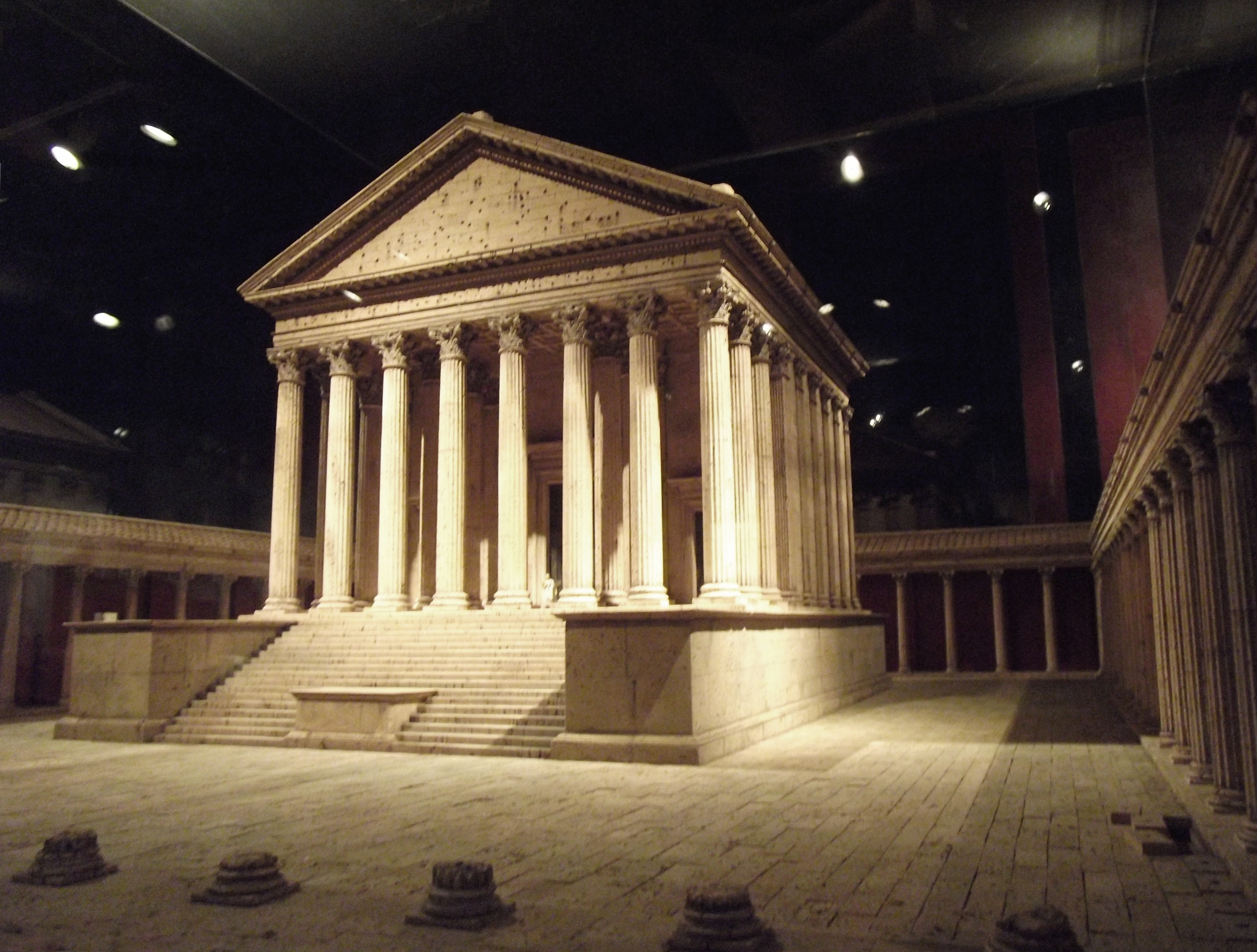
Model of the Temple of the Capitoline Triad

=== Late antiquity ===
A temple to the Capitoline triad stood upon the small hill in the southernmost part of the first century Colonia Claudia Ara Agrippinensium that should later become the site of St. Maria im Kapitol. The temple was built to commemorate Claudia Ara Agrippinensium being granted the title of colonia. The temple itself measured 33 m x 29.5 m and was surrounded by a 97 m x 69 m courtyard. Inside of the temple, three cellae – one for each of the worshipped gods – were built. The temple’s walls were later used as a foundation for the church. In particular, the nave, which still exists today, stands on the foundations of this temple, which provided the basic shape of the church before it was expanded to the west and east.

=== Early middle ages ===
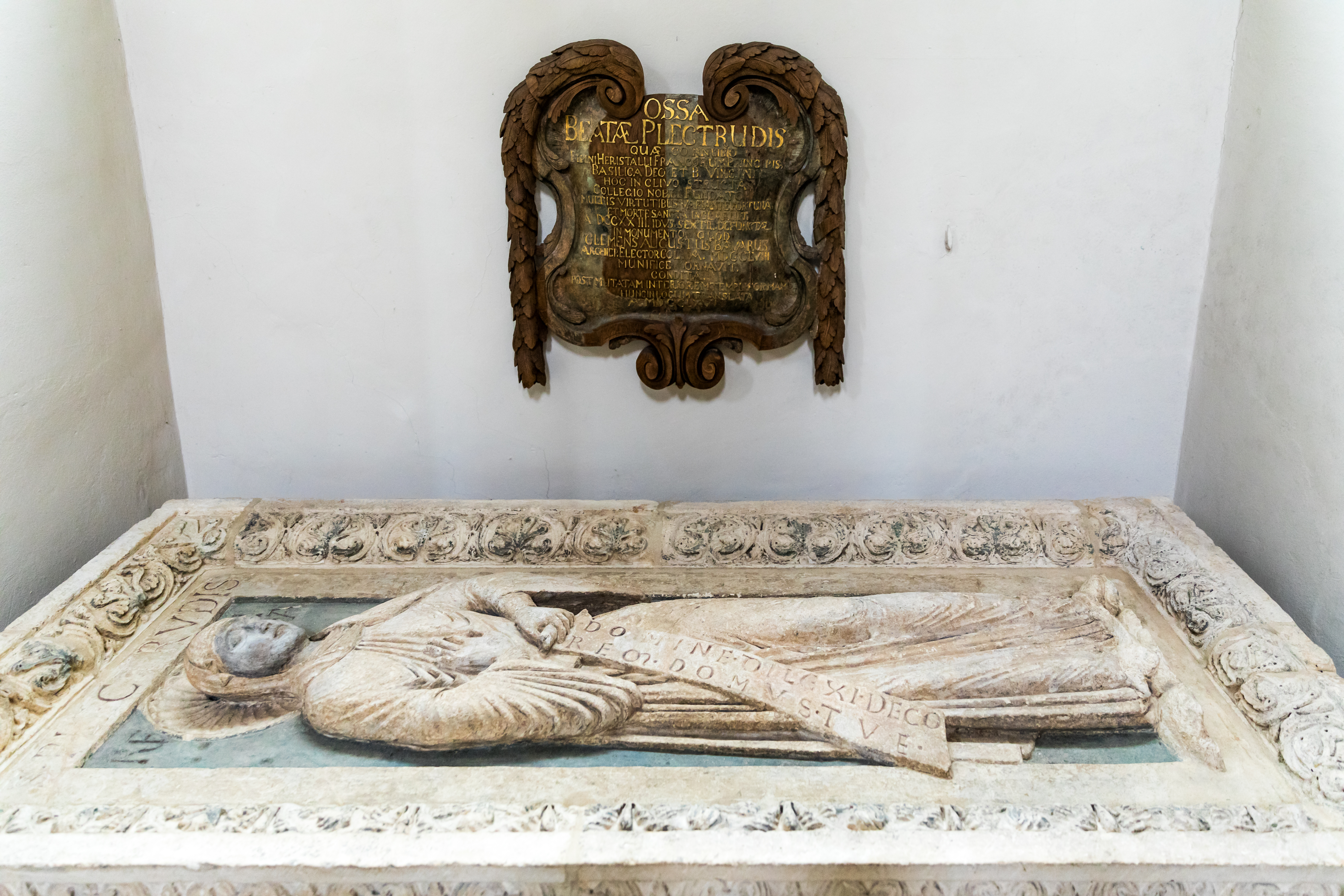
Romanesque gravestone (around 1160) of Plectrude (died 718)

After the Franks conquered Cologne in the fifth century, the Frankish mayors of the palace resided around the Capitoline hill. Pepin of Herstal, who effectively ruled the empire after becoming mayor of all three Frankish kingdoms in 687, lived in Cologne for a period of time. His wife Plectrude came from a powerful noble family in Austrasia, probably from the Hugobertine clan. Her presumed father Hugobert was a count palatine, and her grandfather Hugus was probably a mayor of the palace in Austrasia around 617. According to the Hugobertines′ monastery and church foundations (Pfalzel near Trier, Prüm Abbey, Echternach Abbey and St. Mary in the Capitol), the area of influence of the Hugobertines extended beyond the Trier area to the areas north of Cologne. As the eldest of Hugobert's five daughters, Plectrude probably inherited his family property in and around Cologne; the Hugobertine palace was probably located in or next to the remains of the Cologne Capitol (while the Merovingian kings of Francia had their palace, or Pfalz, in the ancient Roman Praetorium of Cologne). Plectrude had a proprietary church built on the ruins of the capitol before her death around 718. She was buried in this aisleless church.

In the winter of 881/882 the Normans advanced as far as Bonn during one of their raids on the Rhine (Viking expansion). According to historical accounts, during the sacking of the city, St. Mary in the Capitol also burned down.

=== High middle ages ===
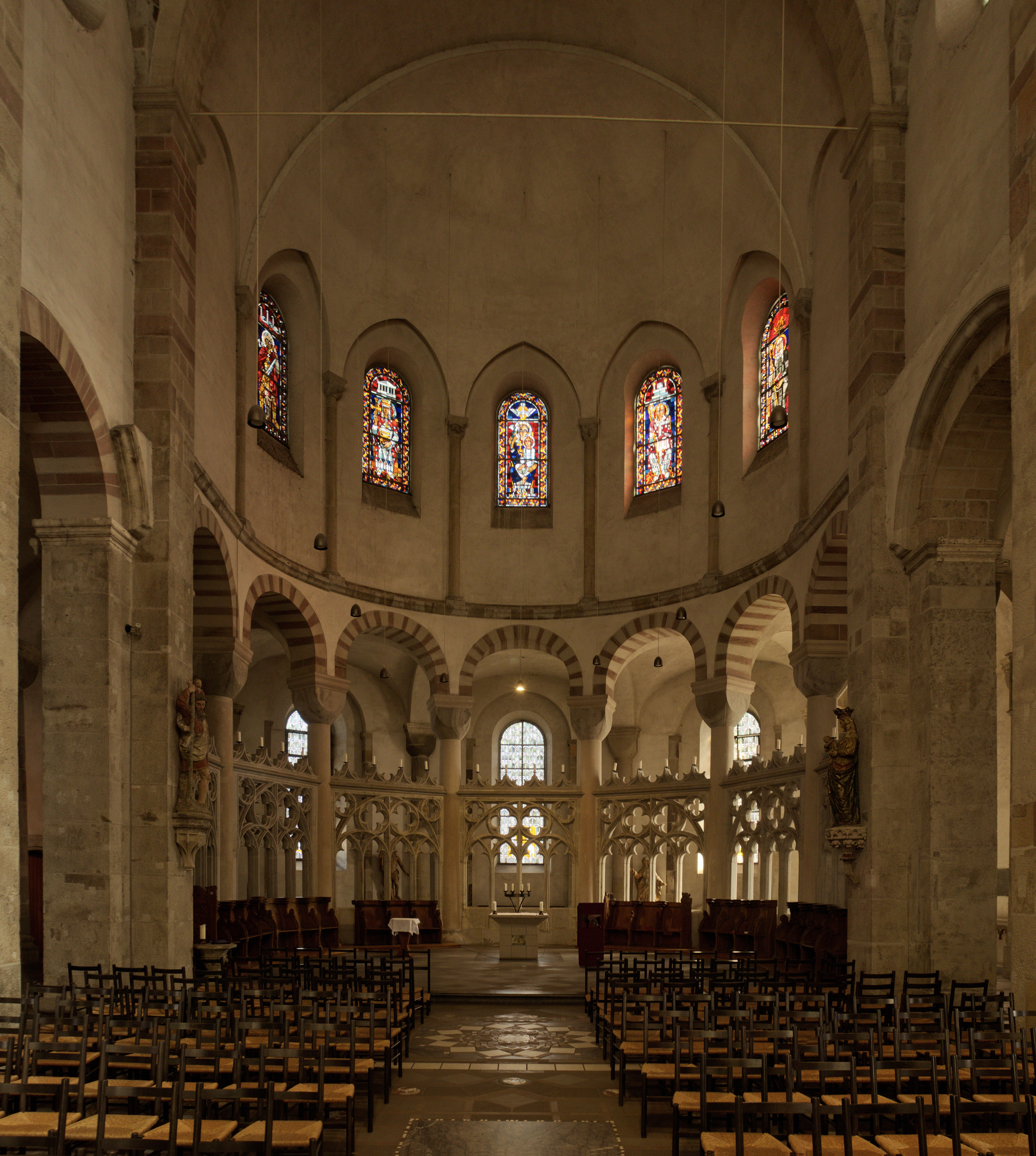
East conche: below Romanesque cube capitals and late Gothic choir screens, above remains of the early Gothic walkway arcade with leaf capitals and pointed arches.

In the middle of the eleventh century, the archbishop of Cologne Hermann II. and his sister Ida, abbess of St. Maria im Kapitol, now a women's monastery, initiated construction of a new church. The altar and the nave were consecrated by pope Leo IX. The cross basilica, around whose towerless crossing there are three almost equally weighted circular enclosures with ambulations (the so-called conches), follows the floor plan of the Church of the Nativity in Bethlehem. From the beginning, the side aisles had round-arched groin vaults, the central nave and the side cones were flat-roofed. In 1170 the westwork was expanded into a representative group of three towers.

At the beginning of the 13th century, the east conche received a double-shell wall structure with a walkway on the inside and a dwarf gallery on the outside. The east gable of the choir was brought forward to the beginning of the apse curve. Around 1240 the central nave of the nave was raised and covered with a six-part Gothic ribbed vault. Around 1500 the windows were enlarged to have ogival arches and were provided with tracery.

=== Later centuries ===
The bell tower collapsed in 1637 and only the lower floors were restored. The stair towers, but not the Romanesque flank towers that have survived to this day, were demolished down to the base floors in 1780 due to their dilapidation. In the same century, the roofs of the nave and choir were brought to the same height and the roofs of the transept arms (north and south conches) were lowered.

In the 19th century, the Romanesque condition, which had been changed by the Gothic renovations, was partially restored.

=== 20th century ===
In World War II, the church was damaged heavily. Until 1956, the church could only be used in the closed off western part. In 1984, the eastern part was reopened and could also be used.

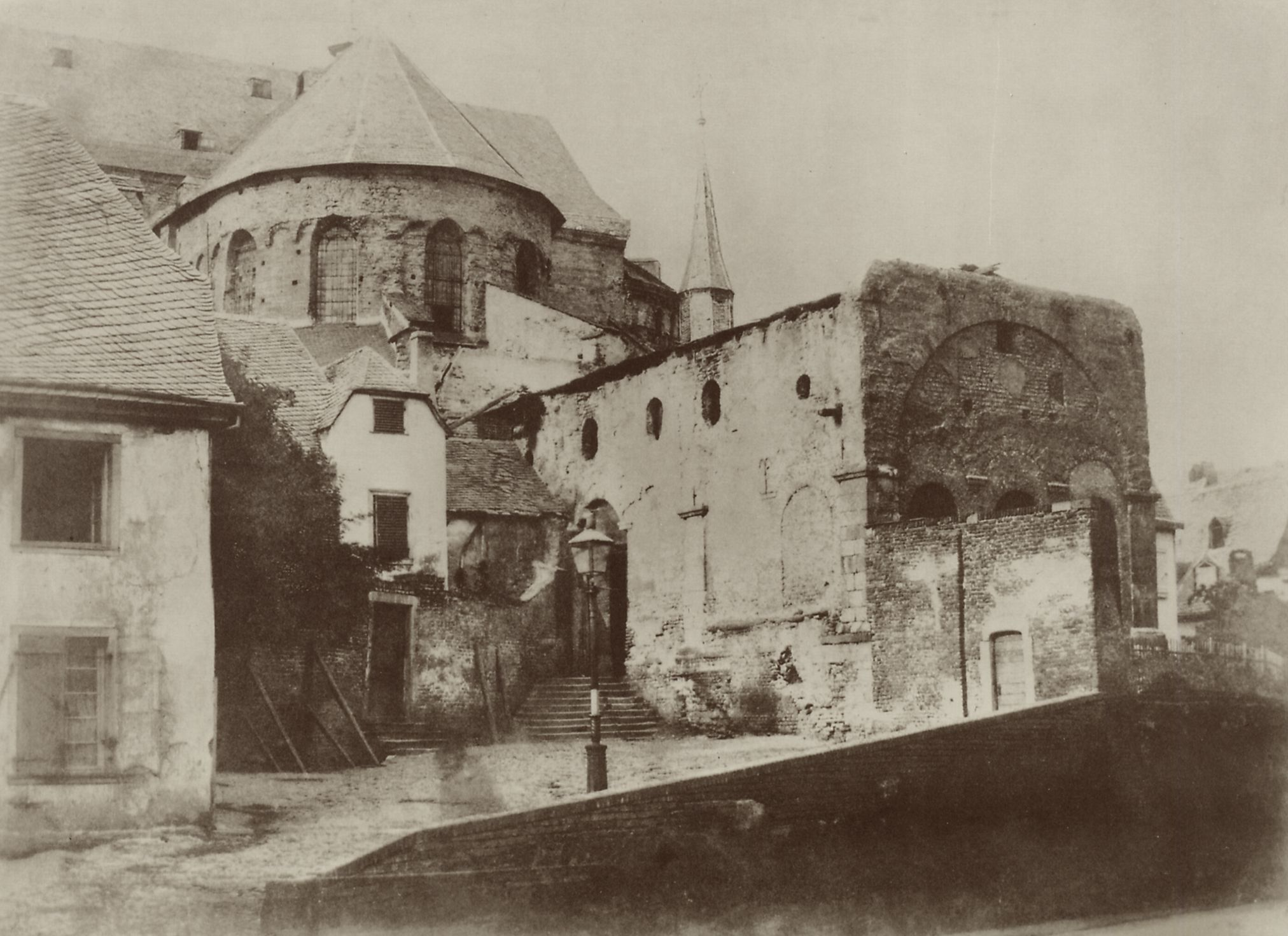
South conche still with Gothic enlarged windows, photo around 1850

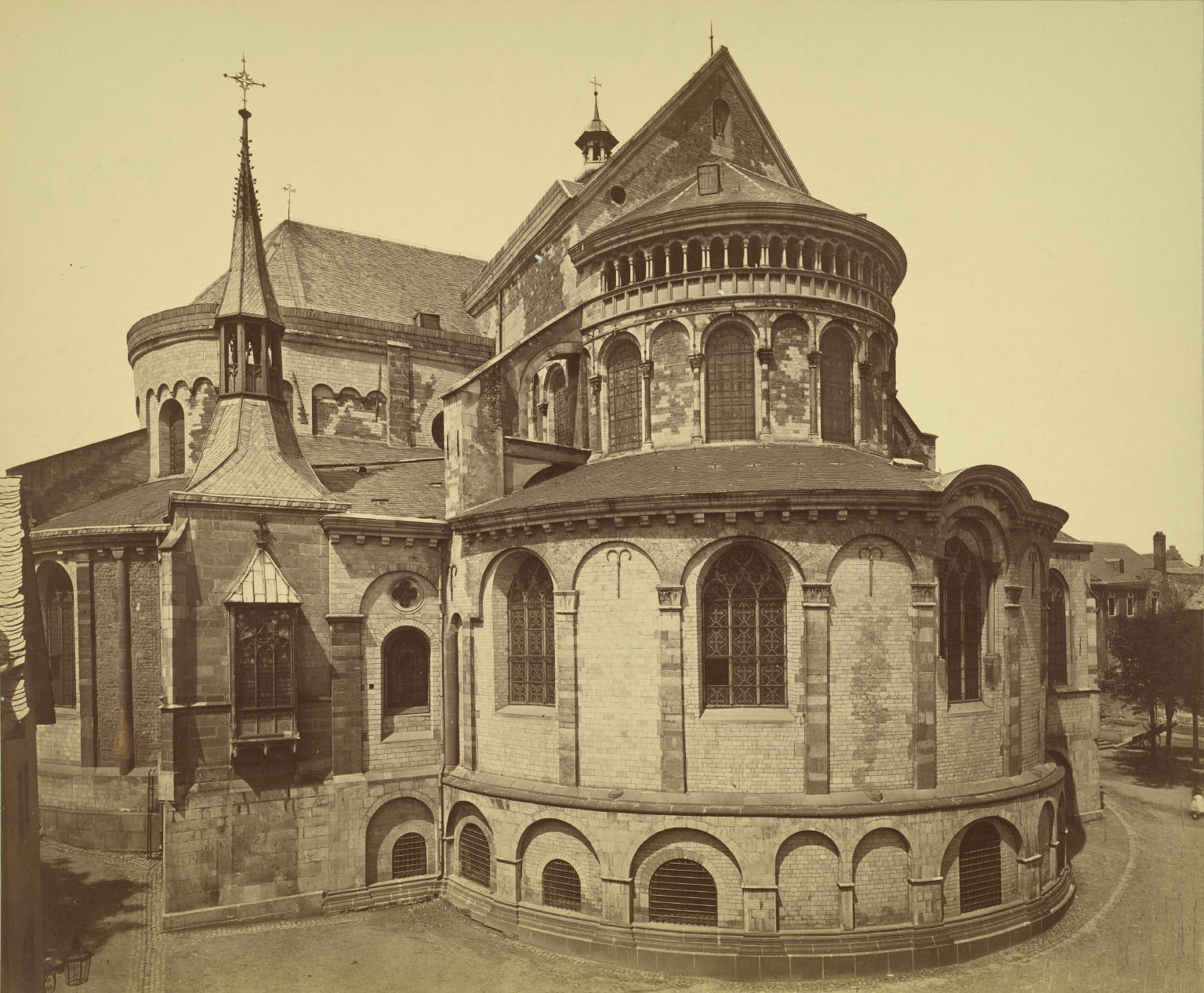
East conche with dwarf gallery from the 13th century, clerestory again Romanesque, windows in the ambulatory are still Gothic

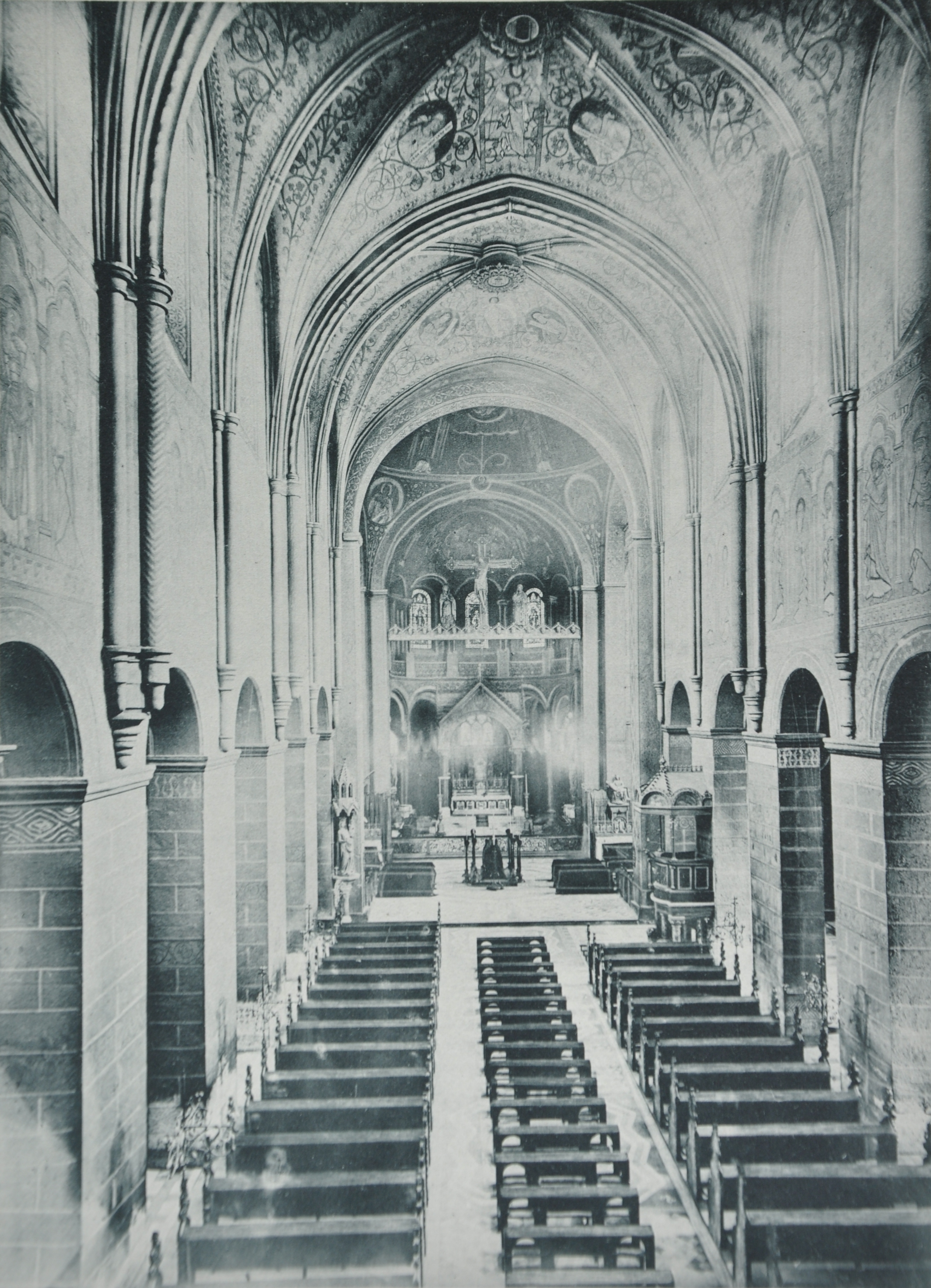
Central nave with six-part ribbed vaults, 1240–1942

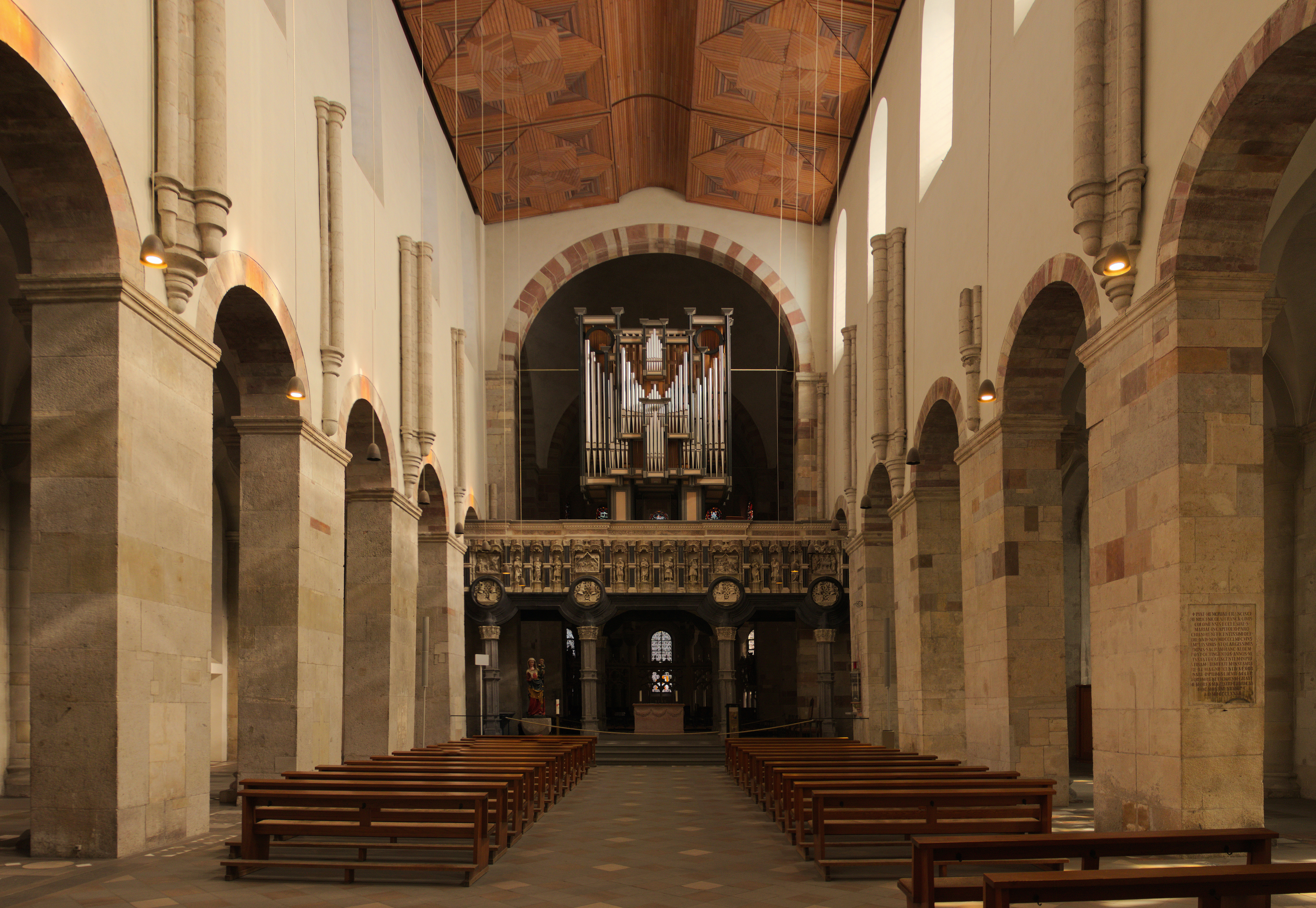
Nave, view to the east to the rood screen in front of the crossing

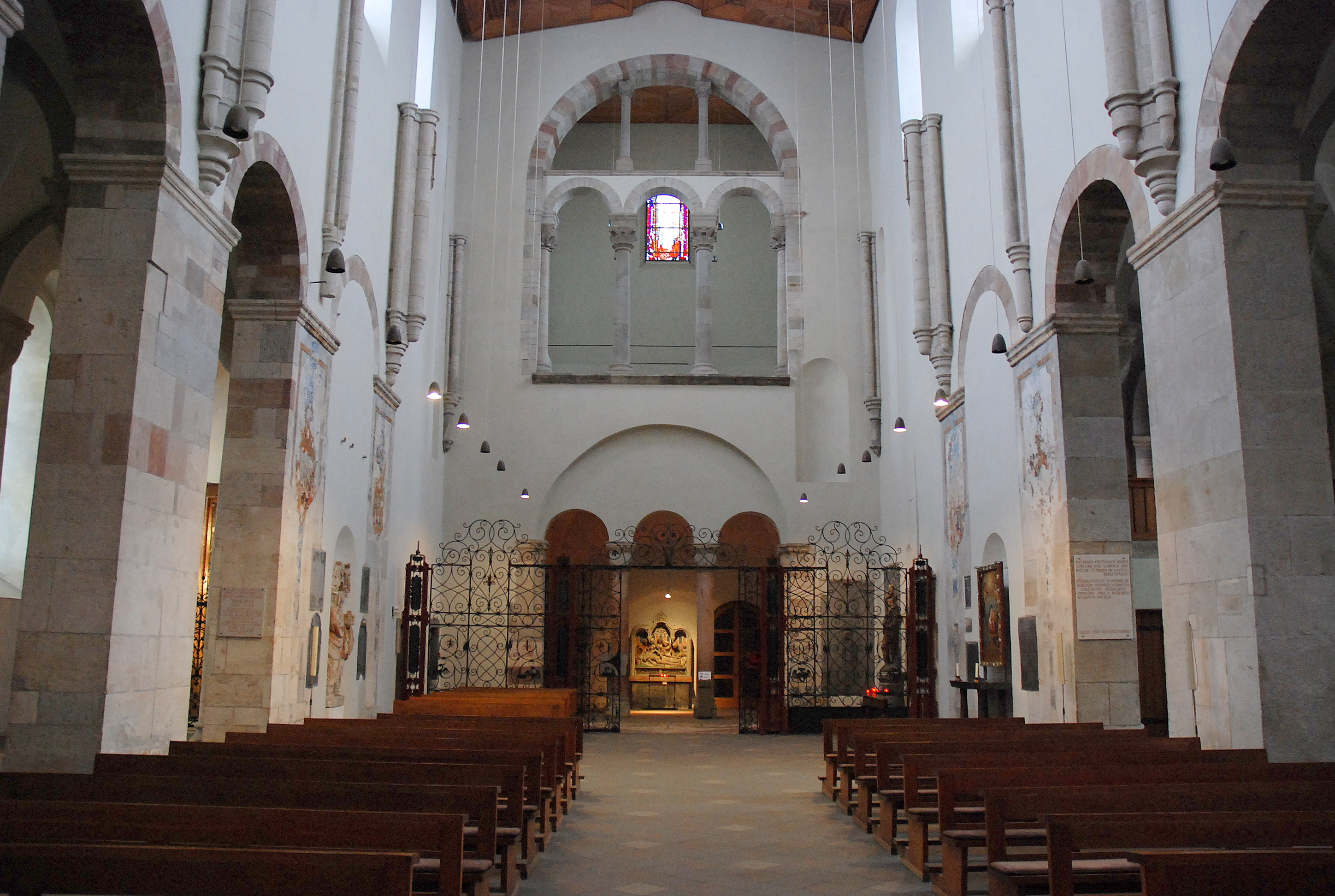
Nave to the west, double arcades modeled on the Palatine Chapel, Aachen

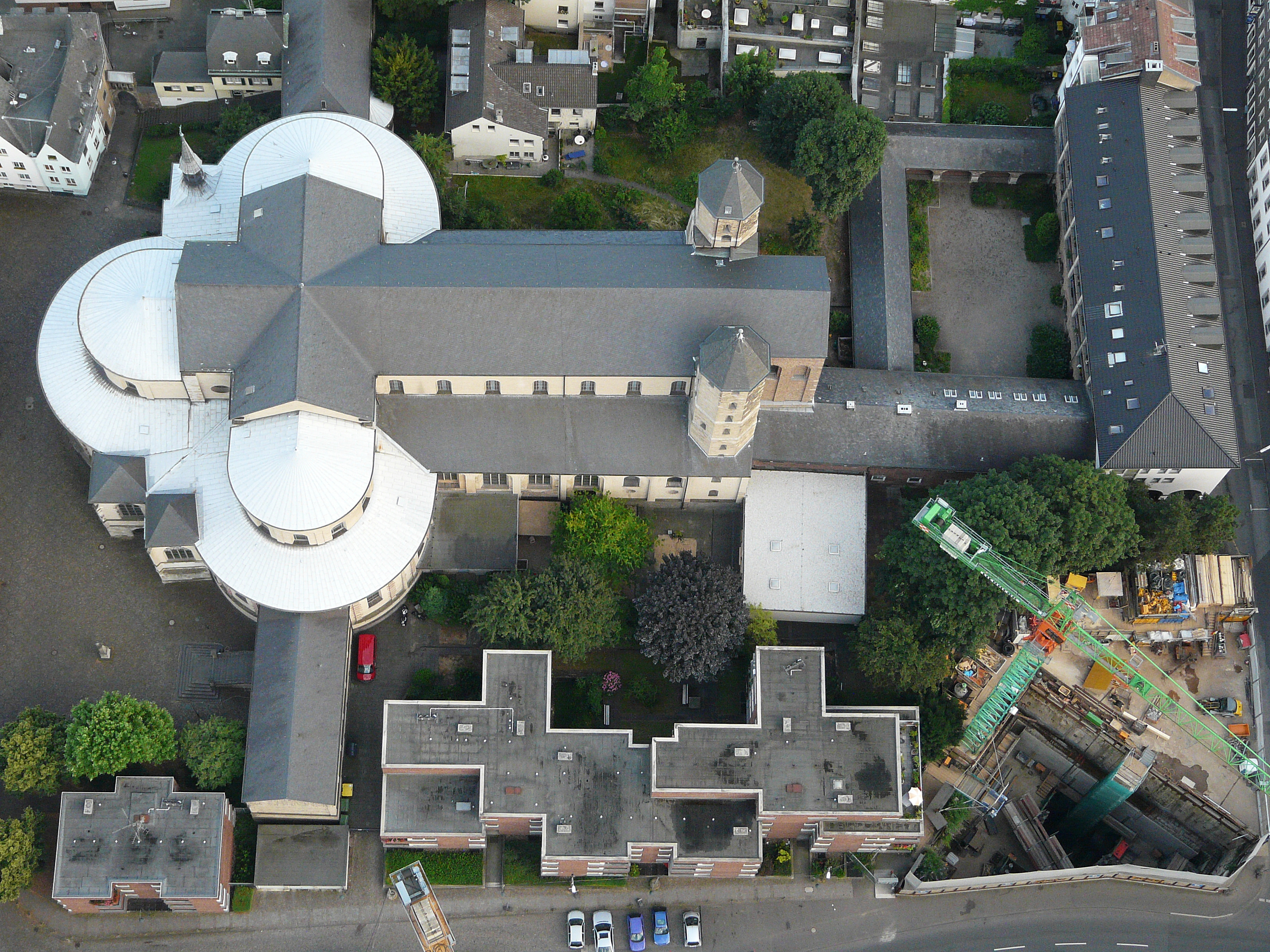
Bird's eye view of the church and monastery building

== Works of art ==
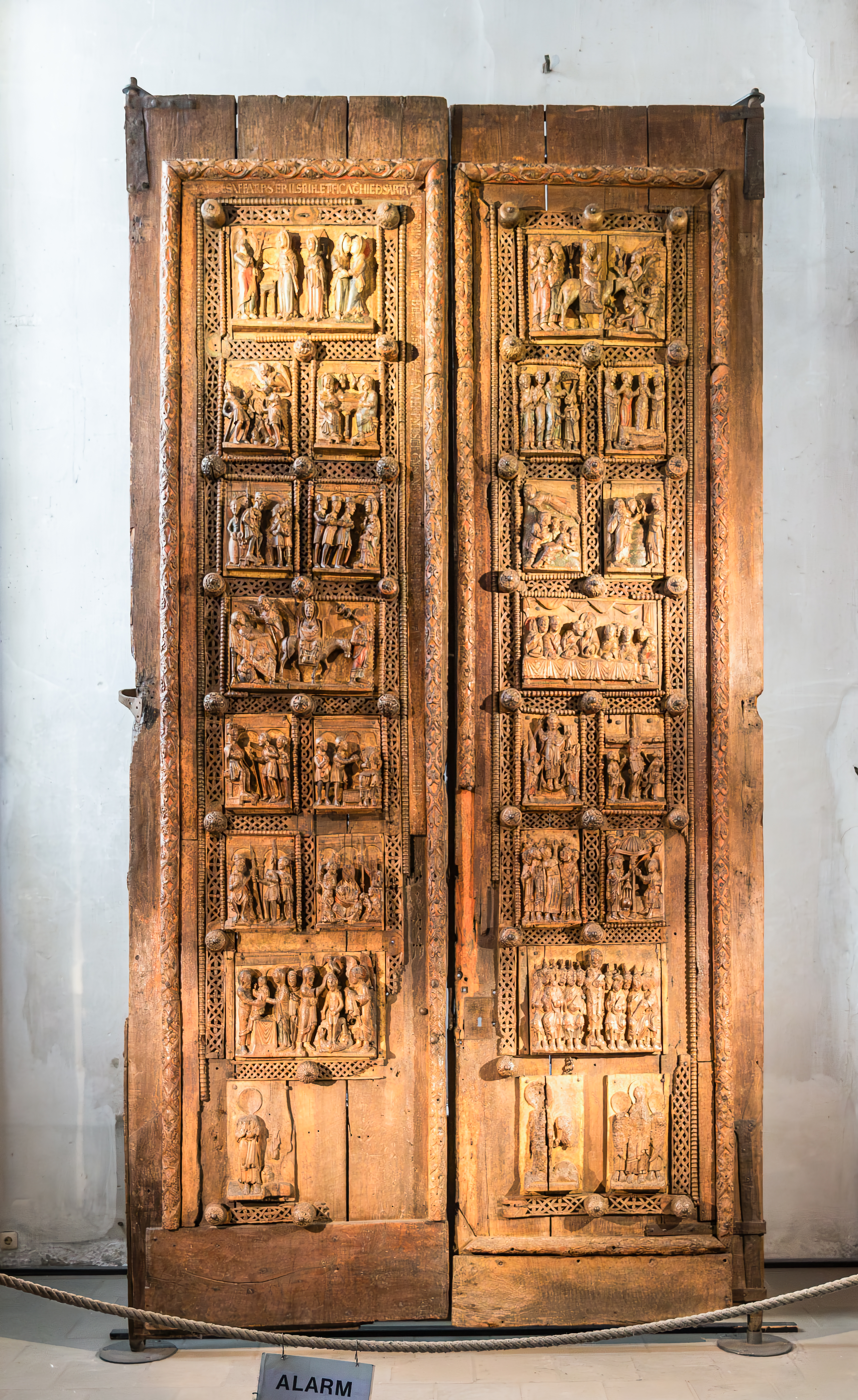
The only surviving Romanesque wooden portal (from 1049–65)

The church's works of art include:

- the wooden doors (from c. 1065). The two door wings closed the portal of the north conche for almost 900 years and are still in excellent condition and even show traces of paint. The door wings show 26 reliefs with scenes from the life of Jesus. The model for this door is the early Christian wooden doors, for example from Santa Sabina in Rome or Sant'Ambrogio in Milan. In their structure of framed reliefs, the door leaves follow the tradition of late antiquity. The left door shows the childhood of Jesus according to Matthew, the right shows the passion of Jesus and his resurrection.
- two ledgers of Plectrudis' sarcophagus (c. 1160 and 1280)
- Hermann-Josef-Virgin with the apple (c. 1180)
- Hardenrath chapel with choristers' tribune (second half of the 15th century)
- Virgin on a Throne (likely 1200)
- Plague crucifix (c. 1300)

== See also ==
- Twelve Romanesque churches of Cologne
- Cologne Cathedral
- German architecture
- Romanesque architecture
- List of regional characteristics of Romanesque churches
- Romanesque secular and domestic architecture
- High medieval domes
