= Agilulf (Suebi) =

5th-century Suebi chieftain; founder of the Agilolfings dynasty

Agilulf (c. 420 – after 482) was a chieftain of the Suebian Quadi. He was probably the son of Hunimund, and was possibly a follower of Arius. Agilulf is considered the founder of the Agilolfings dynasty of the Baiuvarii.

== Sources ==
- Fries-Knoblach, Janine; Steuer, Heiko; Hines, John, eds. (2014). The Baiuvarii and Thuringi: An Ethnographic Perspective. Boydell & Brewer Ltd. ISBN 9781843839156.
