= Grimoald of Bavaria =

Bavarian duke

Grimoald II (or Grimwald) (died 725) was the duke of Bavaria from about 715 to his death.

He was the youngest of the four sons of Theodo of Bavaria and his wife Folchaid and the uncle of Swanachild, the second wife of Charles Martel. At first, he co-reigned with his brothers Theodbert, Theobald, and Tassilo II and then, from around 719, alone. His father divided the principality, after involving his two eldest sons with the reign of the duchy in 715.

Upon Theodo's death in 716, the divided duchy was plunged into civil war and all the brothers save Grimoald were dead by 719. It is not certain if the division of the duchy was territorial or a powersharing scheme, but if the former, it seems most probable that Grimoald's capital was either Freising, which he later favoured as a diocesan seat, or Salzburg, which he later treated as a capital of sorts (Vita Corbiniani).

It was Grimoald who induced Saint Corbinian to come to Bavaria in 724 to evangelise. Grimoald had married his brother's widow, Biltrude (Pilitrudis), and by canon law this was incest. Corbinian promptly rebuked the duke, refusing to be in their presence until they atoned. As a result, Grimoald and Pilitrudis confessed their transgressions, humbled themselves and abjured their union. However, their separation was apparently incomplete. One day, while sitting at the table with Pilitrudis, Grimoald threw a piece of bread to his favourite hound. In response, Corbinian overthrew the tables, and left, declaring that Grimoald "was not a fit associate for a minister of god." Ignoring his wife, who was enraged by this, Grimoald left with his court, and brought the bishop back to the palace. In a frenzy of rage and disappointment, Pilitrudis hired assassins to kill Corbinian, but this was discovered. Corbinian left, and excommunicated both Grimoald and Pilitrudis. A few years later, in 725, Charles Martel marched against Bavaria and carried off Pilitrudis, killing Grimoald in battle.

Preceded by Theodo	Duke of Bavaria; 715–725	Succeeded by Hugbert
