= Theobald of Bavaria =

Duke of Bavaria
- Reign: c. 716 – c. 719
- Predecessor: Theodo II
- Successor: Grimoald
- Died: c. 719; Ratisbon, Duchy of Bavaria (Modern day Regensburg, Germany)
- Spouse: Biltrude
- Father: Theodo II
- Religion: Chalcedonian Christianity

Theobald (also Theudebald, Theodolt, or Theodoalt) (died 717/719) was the duke of Bavaria from at least 711, when his father Theodo associated him with his rule at Passau or Salzburg. He was the second son of Theodo and Folchaid.

His father divided the duchy between his four sons some time before 715. On his death in 716, the duchy was divided, but it is not certain whether this division was territorial or not. If so, it seems likely, from references to wars with the Thuringii, that Theobald had his capital at Ratisbon and his dukedom corresponded to that diocese.

Theobald's name occurs commonly in the "Codex of Salzburg" (Salzburger Verbrüderungsbuch) of 784.

Theobald married Biltrude as his first or second wife. He may have had a prior marriage to one Waldrada, who conversely may have been his younger brother Tassilo's wife. Biltrude later married Grimoald, his youngest brother and successor.

== Bibliography ==
- Wilhelm Störmer: Die Baiuwaren. Von der Völkerwanderung bis Tassilo III. 2. Auflage. Beck, München 2007, ISBN 978-3-406-47981-6.
- Rudolf Reiser: Agilolf oder Die Herkunft der Bayern. Ehrenwirth, München 1977, ISBN 3-431-01894-7.

Preceded by Theodo II	Duke of Bavaria c. 716 – c. 719	Succeeded by Grimoald
