= Pilithrude =

Pilithrude (8th century – between 725 and 730) was a Duchess consort of Asti by marriage to Theobald of Bavaria and Grimoald of Bavaria.

She married her former brother-in-law, Grimoald, in 719. The marriage was extremely controversial in the eyes of the Catholic Church and resulted in the church refusing to acknowledge Grimoald's rule. During Charles Martel's invasions of Bavaria in 725 and 729, Grimoald was killed and Pilithrude was brought to Frankland, where she may have died in poverty.
