= Odilo, Duke of Bavaria =

Odilo
- Duke of Bavaria
- Reign: 737–748
- Predecessor: Hugbert
- Successor: Tassilo III
- Died: 18 January 748
- Spouse: Hiltrud
- Issue: Tassilo III
- House: Agilolfing
- Father: Gotfrid

Odilo, also Oatilo or Uatilo (died 18 January 748) of the Agilolfing dynasty was Duke of Bavaria from 737 until his death in 748. He had the Lex Baiuvariorum compilation edited, the first ancient Germanic law collection of the Bavarians.

== Life ==
Odilo by his Agilolfing descent was an Alemannic nobleman, a son of Duke Gotfrid (d. 709) whom he succeeded in Thurgau until 737, when with the death of Hugbert of Bavaria the older line of the dynasty became extinct and he inherited the rulership of the Duchy of Bavaria.

Odilo presided over the establishment of bishoprics in Bavaria in 739, when the four dioceses of Regensburg, Freising, Passau, and Salzburg were established by St. Boniface, who in 741 also founded the Diocese of Würzburg in adjacent Franconia. His measures sparked a revolt by Bavarian nobles and the duke temporarily had to seek refuge at the court of the Frankish Mayor of the Palace Charles Martel. In 741, Odilo married Charles Martel's daughter Hiltrud, but upon the death of her father found himself at war with her brothers Carloman and Pepin the Short.

He rebelled to support the Alamans with the support of Hunald I of Aquitaine in 742/43 against Frankish rule after persuading him to attack Neustria to burn down Chartres. He was finally defeated in 743 after a battle at the river Lech, and had to accept Frankish overlordship over Bavaria, but remained duke. He further consolidated his rule, when he came to the aid of Prince Boruth of Carantania against repeated Avar incursions and was able to vassalize the Slavic principality in the southeast.

After his death in 748, Grifo, a younger son of Charles Martel and half-brother of Odilo's widow Hiltrud, sought to establish his own rule in Bavaria and abducted Odilo's son Tassilo III. However, the next year he was defeated by Pepin the Short who installed seven-year-old Tassilo III as Duke of Bavaria.

Odilo is accepted as the founder of the abbeys of Benediktbeuern (in 739), Niederaltaich (741), and Mondsee (748), as well as a number of others. He was buried at Gengenbach Abbey in Alamannia.

== Sources ==
- Borgolte Michael, Die Grafen Alemanniens in merowingischer und karolingischer Zeit. Eine Prosopographie, Jan Thorbecke Verlag Sigmaringen 1986.
- Borgolte Michael, Geschichte der Grafschaften Alemanniens in fränkischer Zeit, Jan Thorbecke Verlag Sigmaringen 1984.
- Geuenich, Dieter, Geschichte der Alemannen, Kohlhammer Verlag Stuttgart Berlin Köln 1997.
- Couser, Johnathan (2010). "The Changing Fortunes of Early Medieval Bavaria to 907 AD". History Compass. 8 (4): p.. 333.
- Wood, I. N. (1994). The Merovingian kingdoms, 450-751. London: Longman. ISBN 0-582-21878-0. OCLC 27172340.

Preceded by Hugbert of Bavaria	Duke of Bavaria; 736–748	Succeeded by Tassilo III
