= Theodbert of Bavaria =

Duke of Bavaria

Duke of Bavaria
- Reign: c. 702-716 or 711-716
- Predecessor: Theodo
- Successor: Grimoald
- Born: c. 685
- Died: c. 719 (aged 34)
- Spouse: Regintrud
- Issue: Hugbert and Guntrud
- House: Agilolfings
- Father: Theodo
- Mother: Folchaid

Theodbert (also Theodebert, Theudebert, Theotpert, and Theodo) (c. 685 – c. 719) was the duke of Bavaria in some capacity or other from 702 to his death. He was the eldest son of Duke Theodo of Bavaria and Folchaid. He was first associated with his father as duke in 702, ruling from Salzburg. In 711, his younger brother Theobald was co-ruling as well and his father was making plans for a fourfold division of the duchy on his death. Sometime before 715, the division was given, but whether territorial or coregent is not known. If the former, the dioceses set up by Theodo probably corresponded to the duchies of his sons. In that scenario, Theodbert probably had his seat at Salzburg, as since 702.

His father did have him swear to always defend Rupert of Salzburg when he transferred the government to Theodbert. Theodbert also provided military help to Ansprand and Liutprand in their reconquest of Italy in 712.

After Theodo's death, the four brothers warred with each other, but all were dead by 719 save Grimoald, who thereafter ruled alone until his own death. Theodbert had married Regintrude and had a son and a daughter: Hugbert, the only grandson of Theodo II, who inherited the duchy united after Grimoald's death, and Guntrude, who married Liutprand.

Preceded by Theodo	Duke of Bavaria c. 716 – c. 719	Succeeded by Grimoald
