= 1460 =

1460 in various calendars
- Gregorian calendar: 1460; MCDLX
- Ab urbe condita: 2213
- Armenian calendar: 909; ԹՎ ՋԹ
- Assyrian calendar: 6210
- Balinese saka calendar: 1381–1382
- Bengali calendar: 866–867
- Berber calendar: 2410
- English Regnal year: 38 Hen. 6 – 39 Hen. 6
- Buddhist calendar: 2004
- Burmese calendar: 822
- Byzantine calendar: 6968–6969
- Chinese calendar: 己卯年 (Earth Rabbit); 4157 or 3950 — to — 庚辰年 (Metal Dragon); 4158 or 3951
- Coptic calendar: 1176–1177
- Discordian calendar: 2626
- Ethiopian calendar: 1452–1453
- Hebrew calendar: 5220–5221
- Hindu calendars
- Vikram Samvat: 1516–1517
- Shaka Samvat: 1381–1382
- Kali Yuga: 4560–4561
- Holocene calendar: 11460
- Igbo calendar: 460–461
- Iranian calendar: 838–839
- Islamic calendar: 864–865
- Japanese calendar: Chōroku 4 / Kanshō 1 (寛正元年)
- Javanese calendar: 1376–1377
- Julian calendar: 1460; MCDLX
- Korean calendar: 3793
- Minguo calendar: 452 before ROC 民前452年
- Nanakshahi calendar: −8
- Thai solar calendar: 2002–2003
- Tibetan calendar: ས་མོ་ཡོས་ལོ་ (female Earth-Hare); 1586 or 1205 or 433 — to — ལྕགས་ཕོ་འབྲུག་ལོ་ (male Iron-Dragon); 1587 or 1206 or 434

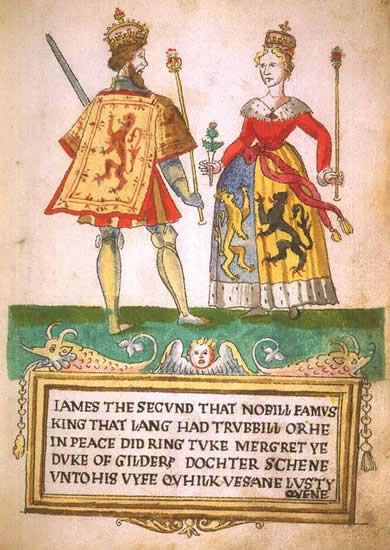
August 3: King James II of Scotland is killed in an explosion, and his widow, Queen Mary of Gueldres, becomes the regent for their son, King James III.

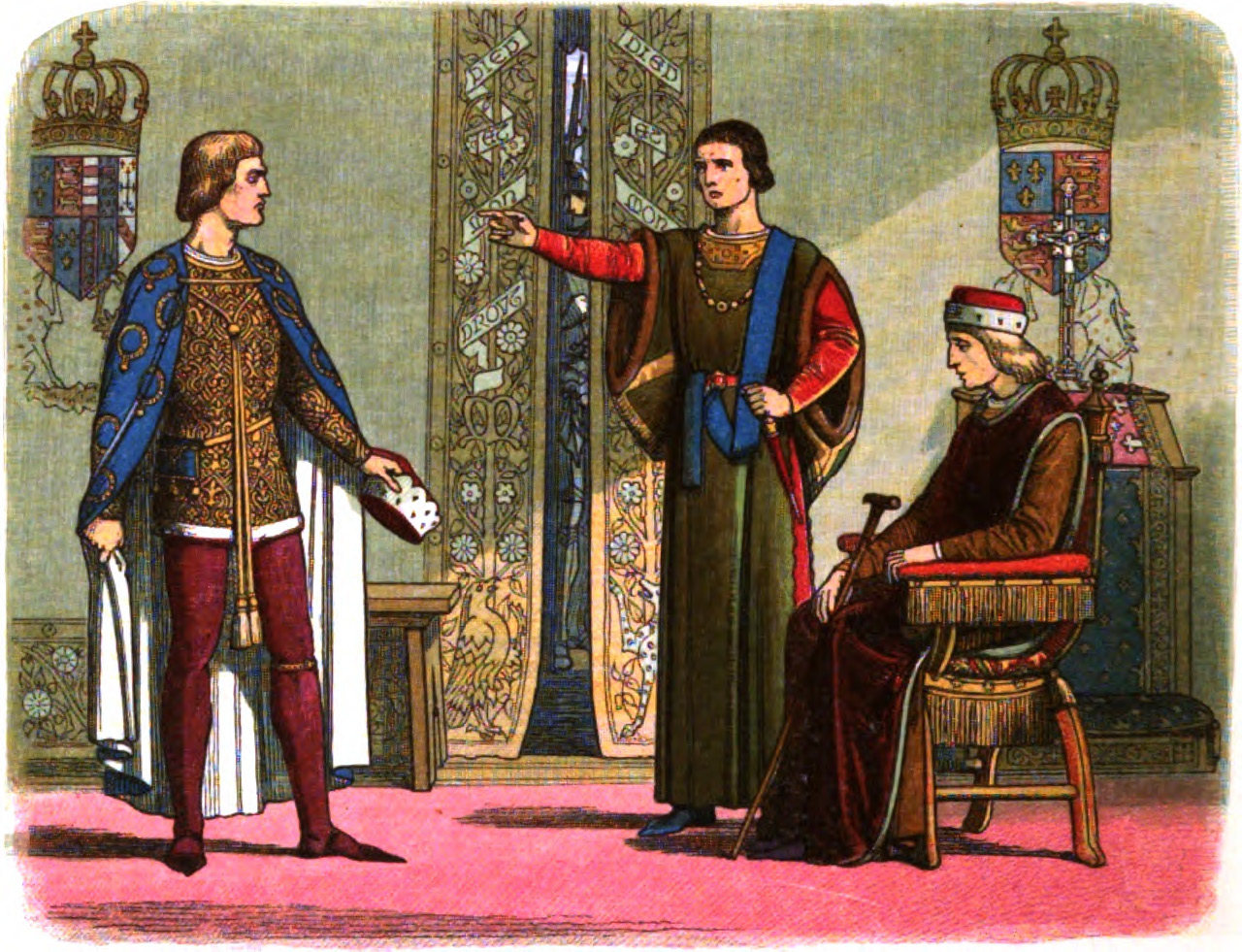
Richard of York (center) gains right to but is killed in battle a month later; King Henry VI (right) is captured as a prisoner of war

Year 1460 (MCDLX) was a leap year starting on Tuesday of the Julian calendar, the 1460th year of the Common Era (CE) and Anno Domini (AD) designations, the 460th year of the 2nd millennium, the 60th year of the 15th century, and the 1st year of the 1460s decade.

== Events ==
=== January–March ===
- January 14 – After gaining a consensus at the Council of Mantua, Pope Pius II formally declares a Christian crusade against the Muslim Ottoman Empire to recapture Constantinople, which had been captured by the Ottomans in 1453.
- January 15 – At the Battle of Sandwich in England, Yorkists raid Sandwich, Kent, and capture the royal fleet.
- February 29 – Johann IV and his brother Sigismund of the House of Wittelsbach become the joint rulers of "Bavaria-Munich", one of several smaller states that had been fragmented from the original Duchy of Bavaria, upon the death of their father, Albrecht III the Pious. Albrecht III's third son, Albrecht IV, will reunite Bavaria-Munich with the other states (Bavaria-Landshut, Bavaria-Ingolstadt and Bavaria-Straubing) into a single Duchy of Bavaria in 1503.
- March 4 – At Rome on the Wednesday during Ember Days, Pope Pius II addresses an assembly of the College of Cardinals and criticizes most of them, declaring that "Your lifestyle is such that you would appear to have been chosen, not to govern the state, but called to enjoy pleasures. You avoid neither hunting, nor games, nor the company of women. You put together parties that are more opulent than is fitting. You wear clothes that are far too expensive. You overflow with gold and silver." He then directs them to consider the qualities of new candidates for the College. The next day, six cardinals are elected, including Francesco Nanni-Todeschini-Piccolomini, the Pope's nephew, who will later become Pope Pius III.
- March 5 – King Christian I of Denmark, the various nobles of the Duchy of Schleswig and the County of Holstein agree to the Treaty of Ribe, electing King Christian as the new Duke of Schleswig and Count of Holstein, and placing both political entities under Denmark's control.
- March 21 – After having control of Malbork Castle, the Polish Army begins a siege against the Prussian town of Marienburg.

=== April–June ===
- April 4 – The University of Basel is founded in Switzerland.
- May 30 – Demetrios Palaiologos, the ruler of the Byzantine despotate of Morea in southern Greece surrenders the capital, Mystras,to the Ottomans. The Ottoman sultan Mehmed II grants some islands in the Aegean Sea to Palaiologos, and he lives for several years in relative comfort.
- June 3 – Pope Pius II re-imposes a 1454 ban against trade with the Prussian Confederation, and extends it to include a ban against trading with the Kingdom of Poland, after the Prussian states and Poland refuse to join in the proposed crusade against the Ottoman Empire.
- June 26 – Wars of the Roses: Richard Neville, 16th Earl of Warwick and Edward, Earl of March (eldest son of Richard Plantagenet, Duke of York) land in England at Sandwich, Kent with an army, and march on London.

=== July–September ===
- July 2 – The city of London opens its gates to the Yorkist invaders and puts up no resistance to their occupation.
- July 4 – The cannons of the Tower of London, still in Lancastrian hands, are fired on the city of London, which is mostly in Yorkist. The Tower is surrendered on July 19.
- July 5 – The town of Marienburg is captured by the Polish army after a four-month siege that had been started by General Proandota Lubieszowski, who had died during the fighting.
- July 10 – Wars of the Roses – King Henry VI of England is captured as prisoner of war after his army is defeated at the Battle of Northampton by the earls of Warwick and March. It is agreed that York will be Henry's heir, disinheriting the King's son Edward of Westminster, Prince of Wales.
- July 30 – King Henry VI summons the English Parliament to assemble at Westminster on October 7.
- August 3 – King James II of Scotland is killed by the explosion of a cannon which he had purchased from Flanders as part of acquiring the most up-to-date military technology for Scotland. The King had been supervising the bombardment of Roxburgh Castle during a siege to force out the English occupation troops. Historian Robert Lindsay of Pitscottie later writes "as the King stood near a piece of artillery, his thigh bone was dug in two with a piece of misframed gun that brake in shooting, by which he was stricken to the ground and died hastily. He is succeeded by his 8-year-old son, who becomes King James III, with power exercised by the boy's mother, the Queen Regent Mary of Guelders.
- August 8 – Sigismund, the Duke of Austria, is excommunicated from the Roman Catholic Church by Pope Pius II and has his domains placed under an interdict.
- September 14 – The siege of Trebizond, the capital of the Empire of Trebizond, is started by the Ottoman Empire. The Trebizond Emperor, David Megas Komnenos withstands the siege for almost a year.

=== October–December ===
- October 7 – The 22nd parliament of Henry VI is opened, and the House of Commons elects John Green as its speaker.
- October 10 – Richard, Duke of York enters the Council Chamber, places his hand upon the throne, and announces that he is the rightful King of England. He then takes up residence at the royal palace.
- October 25 – The Act of Accord, passed by the Parliament of England, is given royal assent by King Henry VI as a compromise to end the War of the Roses between King Henry's supporters (the Lancastrians) and the supporters of Richard of York (the Yorkists). Under the law, King Henry is permitted to rule England for the rest of his life, but his son, Edward of Westminster, Prince of Wales is removed from the right of succession and Richard of York and his descendants are granted the right to rule upon King Henry's death.
- November 7 – King James II of Cyprus orders his chief minister, George Boustronios, to travel to Larnaca, and to round up "both the serfs and emancipated peasants, both mounted and on foot", to be delivered to the King at Nicosia to be drafted into the King's army, with the promise of benefits to the peasants and emancipation to the serfs.
- December 2 – In Spain, the popular Prince Carlos de Viana, heir to the throne of Navarre, is arrested at Lleida and jailed in Morella by order of his father, King Juan II, leading to an uprising in Catalonia. King Juan eventually yields and frees Prince Carlos two months later on February 25.
- December 30 – Wars of the Roses – Richard of York, set to be the next King of England, is killed along with his son, Edmund, Earl of Rutland, at the Battle of Wakefield as a Lancastrian army under Henry Beaufort, Duke of Somerset and Henry Percy, Earl of Northumberland decisively defeats the Yorkists. York's son Edward becomes leader of the Yorkist faction and the heir to the English throne.

=== Date unknown ===
- Ali Bey Mihaloğlu captures Michael Szilágyi.
- Portuguese navigator Pedro de Sintra reaches the coast of modern-day Sierra Leone.
- A famine breaks out in the Deccan Plateau of India.
- A monk, Leonardo da Pistoia, arrives in Florence from Macedonia, with the Corpus Hermeticum.

== Births ==
- May 8 – Frederick I of Brandenburg-Ansbach (d. 1536)
- June 1 – Enno I of East Frisia (1466–1491) (d. 1491)
- September 29 – Louis II de la Trémoille, French military leader (d. 1525)
- date unknown
  - Vasco da Gama, Portuguese explorer (d. 1524)
  - Isabella Hoppringle, Scottish abbess and spy (d. 1538)
  - Svante Nilsson, regent of Sweden (d. 1512)
  - Ana de Mendonça, Portuguese courtier (d. 1542)
  - Edward Sutton, 2nd Baron Dudley, English nobleman (d. 1532)
- probable
  - Antoine Brumel, Flemish composer (d. 1515)
  - Tristão da Cunha, Portuguese explorer (d. 1540)
  - Katarzyna Weiglowa, Jewish martyr (d. 1539)
  - Gwerful Mechain, Welsh erotic poet (d. 1502)
  - Konstanty Ostrogski, Grand Hetman of Lithuania (d. 1530)
  - Tilman Riemenschneider, German sculptor (d. 1531)
  - Arnolt Schlick, German organist and composer (d. after 1521)
  - Charles Somerset, 1st Earl of Worcester, English nobleman (d. 1526)
  - Rodrigo de Bastidas, Spanish conquistador (d. 1527)
  - Ponce de Leon, Spanish conquistador

== Deaths ==
- February 29 – Albert III, Duke of Bavaria-Munich (b. 1401)
- July 10
  - Humphrey Stafford, 1st Duke of Buckingham, English military leader (b. 1402)
  - John Talbot, 2nd Earl of Shrewsbury (b. c. 1413)
  - Thomas Percy, 1st Baron Egremont, English baron (b. 1422)
- July 19 – Lord Scales, English commander (b. 1397)
- August 3 – King James II of Scotland (b. 1430)
- September 20 – Gilles Binchois, Flemish composer (b. c. 1400)
- September 25 – Katharina of Hanau, German countess regent (b. 1408)
- November 13 – Prince Henry the Navigator, Portuguese patron of exploration (b. 1394)
- December 14 – Guarino da Verona, Italian humanist (b. 1370)
- December 30
  - Edmund, Earl of Rutland, brother of Kings Edward IV and Richard III of England (b. 1443)
  - Richard of York, 3rd Duke of York, claimant to the English throne (in battle) (b. 1411)
- December 31 – Richard Neville, 5th Earl of Salisbury, English politician (executed) (b. 1400)
- date unknown
  - Francesco II Acciaioli, last Duke of Athens (murdered by consent)
  - Israel Isserlein, Austrian Jewish scholar (b. 1390)
  - Reginald Pecock, deposed Welsh bishop and writer (b. c. 1392)
