= Kaspar Bernauer =

Barber surgeon from Augsburg

Kaspar Bernauer (Kaspar Pernawer, ~1385 — ~1450) was a balneotherapist and barber surgeon, father of Agnes Bernauer.

== Biography ==
Kaspar Bernauer was born approximately in 1385, presumably in the town of Scuol in the historical Rhaetian enclave of Engiadina Bassa/Val Müstair Region, which escaped Celticisation, and was fluent in an archaic form of the Vallader dialect of Romansh language.

Nothing is known about his childhood and early youth. It is only known that when Kaspar was already a teenager, he moved with his family to Augsburg. In February 1423, Albert, the son of Ernest, Duke of Bavaria, came to Augsburg for a tournament, where he met Kaspar Bernauer and his daughter Agnes. There exists the following fantastic version of Kaspar's life. In the Blutenburg Castle barber surgeon Kaspar Bernauer after the drowning of his daughter Agnes Bernauer (1435) wrote the story of the castle and its inhabitants in his native Vallader dialect. Dr. Johannes Hartlieb also contributed to the writing of the manuscript.

The castle was built in 1425–40 on the island "Würminsel" on the river Würm for Albert III, Duke of Bavaria and his first wife Agnes Bernauer in the tradition of the "Danube School of Architecture" using "dovetail" wall battlements for the castle walls. In 1440, Albert III refused the offered Bohemian crown in Prague in favor of the Habsburgs.
