= Argula von Grumbach =

Bavarian writer and noblewoman

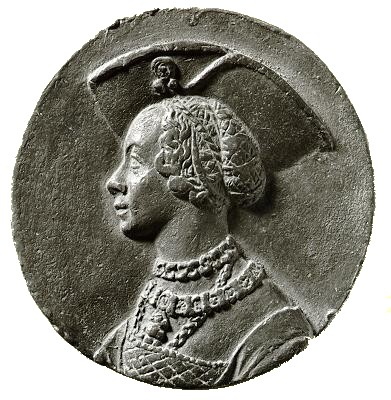
Argula von Grumbach.

Argula von Grumbach (née von Stauff; 1492 – c. 1554) was a Bavarian writer and noblewoman who, starting in the early 1520s, became involved in the Protestant Reformation debates going on in Germany. She became the first Protestant woman writer, publishing letters and poems promoting and defending Martin Luther as well as his co-worker Philip Melanchthon and other Protestant groups. She is most known for directly challenging the University of Ingolstadt's faculty when she wrote a letter to them speaking out against the arrest of a Lutheran student. As one of the few women at the time openly speaking out her views, her writings sparked controversy and often became bestsellers, with tens of thousands of copies of her letters and poems circulating within a few years of their publication.

== Early life ==
Argula von Grumbach was born as Argula von Stauff near Regensburg, Bavaria, in 1492 to Bernhardin von Stauff and Katharina von Törring (or Thering) zu Seefeld. Her siblings were; Secundilla, Zormarina, Gramaflanz,Feirafis and Marcellus, with all of them named after characters in the medieval legend Parsifal.The name Argula is a variant of Argeluse, another character.

Argulas family lived in Ehrenfels castle, which was their baronial seat since 1335. The von Stauff family were Freiherren, who were lords with independent jurisdiction only accountable to the Emperor, and they were among the pre-eminent leaders of Bavarian nobility. But the same year as Argulas birth, her father joined the Löwlerbund, and took part in a rebellion against Albert IV, Duke of Bavaria in protest against the heavy taxing he was imposing on the nobility. The rebellion was beaten down by the forces of the duke and Ehrenfels castle was sacked, Argulas father taken prisoner and her heavily pregnant mother and siblings forced to flee to Neumarkt. Though her father was released and the family could take up residence in their ancestral home, it was a heavy blow and the families finances were crippled by the punitive levy laid on them by Albert IV.

Argula's upbringing was in a political and deeply religious household.Education and attendance at university was highly valued. Argula is thought to have learned to read fluently at a very young age. When she was ten, her father gave her an expensive and beautifully crafted Koberger Bible in German, despite Franciscan preachers discouraging it, saying Scripture would “only confuse her.” She became an avid student of the Bible, memorizing much of its contents.

At the age of sixteen, Argula joined the court in Munich, where she became a lady-in-waiting to duchess Kunigunde, daughter of the Emperor Frederick III. The duchess was said to have a strong personality herself, passionate about politics and religion. The court as a whole was interested in spiritual affairs, so it is there that Argula's studies of the Bible could have become a serious endeavor.

Argula's adolescent life was marked by tragedy. Both her parents became ill from plague and died in 1509.Her father's brother, Hieronymus, became her guardian. He was a leading figure at court but ended up disgraced in a political scandal that led to his execution in 1516. Her outrage at his death most likely prompted her persistent loathing for violence and coercion throughout her life.

== Married life ==
In the same year of her uncle's execution, Argula married Friedrich von Grumbach. The von Grumbach family was not as prestigious as the von Stauffs, but they were still known in German history and Friedrich himself had been appointed to an honorary administrator post in Dietfurt.

He also had several other landholdings throughout Bavaria. Little is known about Friedrich because he remained so much in the shadow of his wife. He is also thought to have had poor health, as he died in 1530.

With him Argula had four children, George, Hans Georg, Gottfried and Apollonia. The only child to survive his parents was Gottfried. It seemed that Argula was the one who made all the arrangements for her children's Protestant educations. Records indicated that Argula took care of many of the financial and business matters of her family even before her husband's death.

Little is known, also, about the relationship between Argula and her husband, although there have been hints through her writings. She refuted others’ suggestions that she was neglecting her duties as a wife in the poem she wrote in 1524, although she also said ‘May God teach me to understand/ How I should act towards my man’, indicating that it could have been a difficult marriage. Friedrich himself was not a Reformer, remaining in the Old Church. He was put under immense pressure to ‘bring her into line’ during the height of her challenging and letter writing. At one point he was even told he was allowed to disable her so as to prevent her from writing or even strangle her without legal repercussions.

Argula married again in 1533 to Count Burian von Schlick, but he died within two years.

== Engagement in the Reformation ==
Martin Luther published his first treatises in 1520 and Philipp Melancthon laid out Luther's teachings in a book. By 1522, Luther had finished his translation of the New Testament in German. Argula von Grumbach read all these writings, and by that same year she had become a follower of Luther and had begun a correspondence with Luther and other similar-thinking Protestants. She would later meet Luther face to face in 1530.

Bavarian authorities had forbidden reception of Lutheran ideas at the time, and the city of Ingolstadt enforced that mandate. In 1523, Arsacius Seehofer, the young teacher and former student at the University of Ingolstadt, was arrested for Protestant views and forced to recant his beliefs on the Bible. The incident would have occurred quietly, but Argula, outraged over it, wrote what was to become her best-known epistle, a letter to the faculty of the university objecting to Seehofer's arrest and exile. The letter urged the university to follow Scripture, not Roman traditions and to explain what heresy Seehofer was guilty of. It also said she had decided to speak out even though she was a woman because no one else would. An excerpt from her letter as follows:

To the honorable, worthy, highborn, erudite, noble, stalwart Rector and all the Faculty of the University of Ingolstadt: When I heard what you had done to Arsacius Seehofer under terror of imprisonment and the stake, my heart trembled and my bones quaked. What have Luther and Melanchthon taught save the Word of God? You have condemned them. You have not refuted them. Where do you read in the Bible that Christ, the apostles, and the prophets imprisoned, banished, burned, or murdered anyone? You tell us that we must obey the magistrates. Correct. But neither the pope, nor the Kaiser, not the princes have any authority over the Word of God. You need not think you can pull God, the prophets and the apostles out of heaven with papal decretals drawn from Aristotle, who was not a Christian at all. . . .

You seek to destroy all of Luther's works. In that case you will have to destroy the New Testament, which he has translated. In the German writings of Luther and Melanchthon I have found nothing heretical. . . Even if Luther should recant, what he has said would still be the Word of God. I would be willing to come and dispute with you in German. . . . You have the key of knowledge and you close the kingdom of heaven. But you are defeating yourselves. The news of what has been done to this lad of 18 has reached us and other cities in so short a time that soon it will be known to all the world. The Lord will forgive Arsacius, as he forgave Peter, who denied his master, though not threatened by prison and fire. Great good will yet come from this young man. I send you not a woman's ranting, but the Word of God. I write as a member of the Church of Christ against which the gates of hell shall not prevail. . .

— Argula von Grumbach, 1523

In the long letter she cited over 80 Scriptures with which she made logical comparisons to the behaviour of the university theologians, to argue her case that they were wrong.

Her letter, which was turned into a booklet, provoked a huge reaction, greatly angering the theologians and became nearly an overnight sensation. She was subjected to insults regarding her writing skills, sexual behavior, and gender. It went through fourteen editions in two months, and became a bestseller. Argula wrote more letters and copies of the first one to other significant figures, including when Duke Wilhelm was to argue her case.

In the early 16th century, the printing press was a new technology, not yet controlled by the State, leading to an information revolution, in which printers were spreading ideas that were disturbing to the establishment, faster than it could be controlled. If something sold well, like early Protestant writings, many printers would create their own editions, spreading often-subversive ideas like wildfire. Something similar was happening with science, for example Nicolaus Copernicus' book on a sun-centered model of the universe. Comparable upheavals had occurred after the return of literacy and literature from the Latin translations of the 12th century, kicking off the Renaissance, as well as the dawn of literacy in Classical Greece and the modern internet era.

Unable to control the spread of her ideas, theologians wanted Argula punished, and her husband lost his position at Dietfurt over the controversy. Argula was also called by many offensive epithets by her critics, especially through the sermons of Professor Hauer, who described her as a “shameless whore” and a “female desperado.”

Argula wrote poems in response to the slander of her, including when a poem apparently written by an Ingoldstadt, accusing her of being a neglectful wife and mother. Her retort was the last of her published works, although she continued corresponding with Luther and other Reformers. She also used her extensive knowledge of scripture to support her arguments.

Argula was highly controversial, shunned by some of her own family, but she also had admirers for her writings. She was praised by the Anabaptist preacher Balthasar Hubmaier in nearby Regensburg, who wrote that she "knows more of the divine Word than all of the red hats" — canon lawyers and cardinals — "ever saw or could conceive of" and compared her to heroic women in the Bible.

Although her challenges to the university were largely ignored, and her efforts to promote her Protestant beliefs unsuccessful, Argula was undeterred, continuing writing pamphlets until that final incident. She engaged in other exceptional activities in this cause, like travelling alone to Nuremberg — which was unheard of for women at that time — to encourage German princes to accept Reformation principles.

== Death ==
Argula von Grumbach was reported in a local chronicle to have died in 1554, but there was some evidence from correspondence of the Munich City Council indicated that she could have been alive as late as 1563.

== Veneration ==
In 2022, Argula was officially added to the Episcopal Church liturgical calendar with a feast day on 14 July.
