= Sabina of Bavaria, Duchess of Württemberg =

Sabina of Bavaria
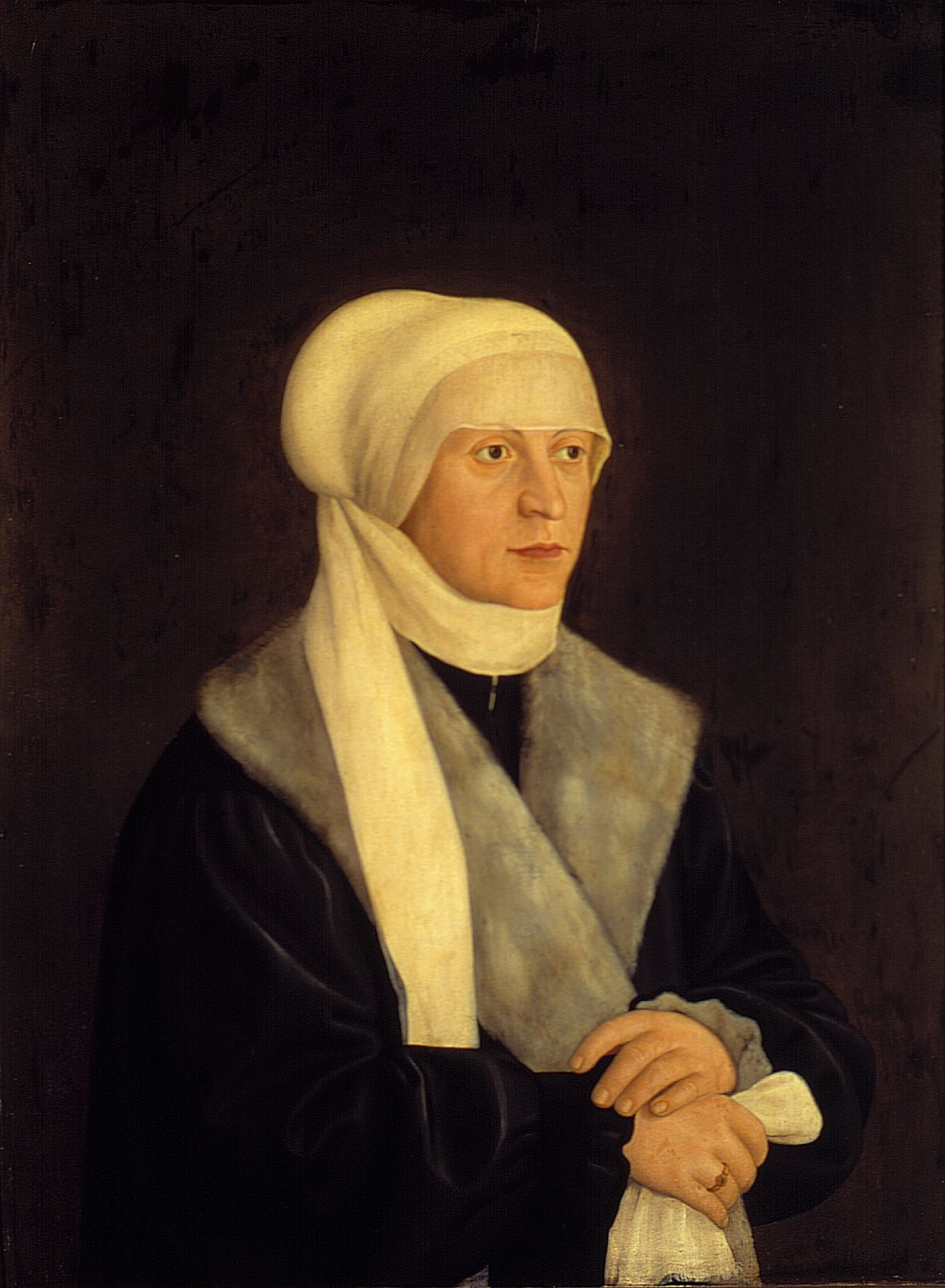
- Portrait by Barthel Beham, 1530

Duchess consort of Württemberg
- Tenure: 2 March 1511 - January 1519
- Tenure: May 1534 - 6 November 1550
- Born: 24 April 1492; Munich, Bavaria, Germany
- Died: 30 August 1564 (aged 72); Nürtingen, Baden-Württemberg, Germany
- Burial: St. George's Collegiate Church, Tübingen
- Spouse: Ulrich, Duke of Württemberg
- Issue: Christoph, Duke of Württemberg; Anna of Württemberg
- House: House of Wittelsbach
- Father: Albert IV, Duke of Bavaria
- Mother: Kunigunde of Austria

Sabina of Bavaria-Munich (24 April 1492 – 30 August 1564) was Duchess consort of Württemberg by marriage to Ulrich, Duke of Württemberg.

== Biography ==
=== Family ===
Sabina was the daughter of Albert IV, Duke of Bavaria and his wife Kunigunde of Austria, daughter of Frederick III, Holy Roman Emperor and Eleanor of Portugal.

=== Duchess consort ===
Sabina was promised at the age of six years for strategic reasons by her uncle, King Maximilian I, to Ulrich of Württemberg to whom she was married 15 years later. This marriage was unhappy because of Ulrich's tendency to violence, so that Sabina was ultimately forced to flee from Württemberg without her two children and seek shelter with her brothers in Munich.

When, in 1551, her son, Christoph, inherited the throne of Württemberg, Sabina moved to Nürtingen, which was then the official widow's residence of the Württembergs. There she led a small court and being an educated woman turned it into a meeting place for Württemberg's Protestants.

With Ulrich of Württemberg, she had two children: Christoph, Duke of Württemberg (12 May 1515 – 28 December 1568), and Anna (30 January 1513 – 29 June 1530).

== Ancestors ==
Sabina's ancestors in three generations
Sabina of Bavaria	Father: Albert IV, Duke of Bavaria	Paternal Grandfather: Albert III, Duke of Bavaria	Paternal Great-grandfather: Ernest, Duke of Bavaria
Sabina of Bavaria	Father: Albert IV, Duke of Bavaria	Paternal Grandfather: Albert III, Duke of Bavaria	Paternal Great-grandmother: Elisabetta Visconti
Sabina of Bavaria	Father: Albert IV, Duke of Bavaria	Paternal Grandmother: Anna of Brunswick-Grubenhagen-Einbeck	Paternal Great-grandfather: Eric I, Duke of Brunswick-Grubenhagen
Sabina of Bavaria	Father: Albert IV, Duke of Bavaria	Paternal Grandmother: Anna of Brunswick-Grubenhagen-Einbeck	Paternal Great-grandmother: Elisabeth of Brunswick-Göttingen
Sabina of Bavaria	Mother: Kunigunde of Austria	Maternal Grandfather: Frederick III, Holy Roman Emperor	Maternal Great-grandfather: Ernest, Duke of Austria
Sabina of Bavaria	Mother: Kunigunde of Austria	Maternal Grandfather: Frederick III, Holy Roman Emperor	Maternal Great-grandmother: Cymburgis of Masovia
Sabina of Bavaria	Mother: Kunigunde of Austria	Maternal Grandmother: Eleanor of Portugal, Holy Roman Empress	Maternal Great-grandfather: Edward of Portugal
Sabina of Bavaria	Mother: Kunigunde of Austria	Maternal Grandmother: Eleanor of Portugal, Holy Roman Empress	Maternal Great-grandmother: Leonor of Aragon
