= Louis X of Bavaria =

Duke of Bavaria from 1516 to 1545

Louis X
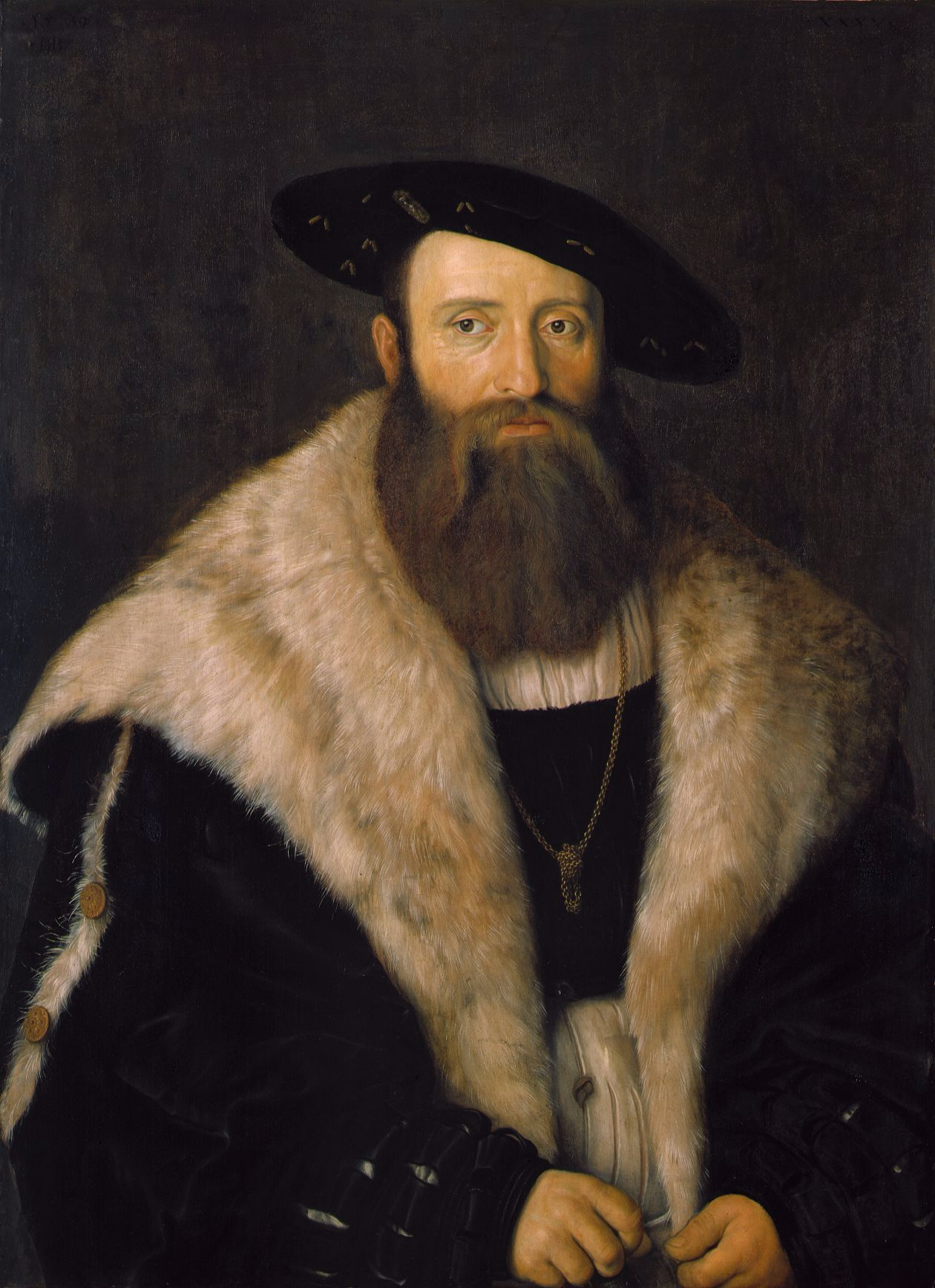

Duke of Bavaria
- Reign: 1516 - 1545
- Predecessor: William IV
- Successor: William IV
- Co-ruler: William IV (1516–1545)
- Born: 18 September 1495; Grünwald, Bavaria
- Died: 22 April 1545 (aged 49); Landshut, Bavaria
- House: Wittelsbach
- Father: Albert IV of Bavaria
- Mother: Kunigunde of Austria
- Religion: Roman Catholicism

Louis X (German: Ludwig X, Herzog von Bayern), (Grünwald, 18 September 1495 – 22 April 1545 in Landshut) was Duke of Bavaria (1516–1545), together with his older brother William IV of Bavaria. His parents were Albert IV and Kunigunde of Austria, a daughter of Emperor Frederick III.

== Biography ==
Though his father had determined the everlasting succession of only the firstborn prince in 1506, Louis as a second-born son refused a spiritual career with the argument that he was born before the edict became valid. With support of his mother and the States-General, Louis forced his elder brother William IV to accept him as co-regent in 1516. Louis then ruled the districts of Landshut and Straubing, in general concord with his brother. In 1516, he refurnished the medieval Trausnitz Castle in Landshut decorating it in the south German Renaissance style.

Like his elder brother, he first showed sympathy for the Protestant Reformation but decided to take action against its expansion in Bavaria already in 1522. Both the dukes also suppressed the uprising of farmers in South Germany in their duchies in 1525. Since Louis claimed the Bohemian crown Bavaria was in opposition to the Habsburgs until 1534 when both dukes reached an agreement with Ferdinand I in Linz.

After his visit in Italy, Louis built the first Italian Renaissance style palace constructed north of the Alps, the Landshut Residence which was modeled 1537–1543 after the Palazzo del Te in Mantua. The Landshut Residence also consisted of an adjoining palace to the previous mentioned which was built in German Renaissance style under the architect Bernhard Zwitzel of Augsburg. Both the palaces were connected together by two wings.

Having no son, the districts that Louis ruled were passed up to his brother William in the end at his death in 1545. This was finally the end of the divisions of the duchy of Bavaria. His illegitimate daughter was Anna von Leonsberg (1525–1556) who married Johann Albrecht Widmannstetter (1506–1557).

== Ancestors ==
Ancestors of Louis X of Bavaria

16. John II of Bavaria
8. Ernest, Duke of Bavaria
17. Catherine of Gorizia
4. Albert III of Bavaria
18. Bernabò Visconti
9. Elisabetta Visconti
19. Beatrice Regina della Scala
2. Albert IV of Bavaria
20. Albert I of Brunswick-Grubenhagen
10. Eric I of Brunswick-Grubenhagen
21. Agnes of Brunswick-Lüneburg
5. Anna of Brunswick-Grubenhagen-Einbeck
22. Otto, Duke of Brunswick-Göttingen
11. Elisabeth of Brunswick-Göttingen
23. Margarethe of Jülich-Berg
1. Louis X, Duke of Bavaria
24. Leopold III, Duke of Austria
12. Ernest, Duke of Austria
25. Viridis Visconti
6. Frederick III, Holy Roman Emperor
26. Siemowit IV of Masovia
13. Cymburgis of Masovia
27. Alexandra of Lithuania
3. Kunigunde of Austria
28. John I of Portugal
14. Edward of Portugal
29. Philippa of Lancaster
7. Eleanor of Portugal, Holy Roman Empress
30. Ferdinand I of Aragon
15. Eleonor of Aragon
31. Eleanor of Alburquerque

Louis X of Bavaria House of Wittelsbach Born: 18 September 1495 Died: 22 April 1545
Regnal titles
Preceded by William IV	Duke of Bavaria; 1516–1545	Succeeded by William IV
