= On the Move: Things in Motion on Earth and Beyond =

2020 book by Romana Romanyshyn and Andriy Lesiv

- Author: Romana Romanyshyn and Andriy Lesiv
- Original title: Куди і звідки
- Translator: Oksana Lushchevska (English)
- Illustrator: Romana Romanyshyn and Andriy Lesiv
- Language: Ukrainian (original)
- Genre: Children's non-fiction; picture book
- Publication date: 2020 (Ukrainian edition); 20 May 2025 (English edition)
- Publication place: Ukraine
- Pages: 64
- ISBN: 978-617-679-821-7

On the Move: Things in Motion on Earth and Beyond (Ukrainian: Куди і звідки, romanized: Kudy i zvidky, lit. 'Where to and where from') is a Ukrainian children's non-fiction picture book written and illustrated by the Ukrainian duo Romana Romanyshyn and Andriy Lesiv.

The book was first published in Ukraine in 2020 by Vydavnyctvo Staroho Leva, and an English-language edition translated by Oksana Lushchevska was published by Enchanted Lion Books in 2025.

The Ukrainian edition was included in the 2021 White Ravens catalogue.

== Review and reception ==
Kirkus Reviews called the book an "informational picture book" and noted that it uses "bright, retro infographics to examine the concept of movement". The review highlighted the range of topics covered, spanning early human travel and technology. The review concluded that the book offers "sophisticated graphics, laden with information."
