= Center for Art, New Ventures and Sustainable Development =

Nonprofit Organization

CANVAS
- Formation: June 13, 2005
- Headquarters: Quezon City
- Location: Philippines
- Founder: Gigo Alampay
- Website: www.canvas.ph

The Center for Art, New Ventures and Sustainable Development (CANVAS) is a nonprofit organization that works with the creative community to promote children's literacy, explore national identity, and deepen public appreciation for Philippine art, culture, and the environment.

== Notable programs ==
Since its inception in 2005, CANVAS has branched out with multiple programs.

Through its "One Million Books for One Million Filipino Children" Campaign, it collaborates with local artists and writers to publish original picture books in full color, which are then donated to children in poor communities of the Philippines. Winning stories that come out of the Romeo Forbes Children's Story Writing Competition are produced and distributed through this campaign.

The Tumba-Tumba Children's Museum of Philippine Art is a museum currently in the works in Batangas. The Museum will showcase child-friendly Philippine art as a pathway to encourage a love for books and encourage discussion on relevant issues.

Looking for Juan is a local online store that offers children's books published by CANVAS and other locally made gift items. Aligned with the aim to improve functional literacy of the youth, Looking for Juan supports the One Million Books for One Million Children campaign.

CANVAS’ One Million Books for One Million Children campaign also benefits from Marahuyo Art Projects, an online platform and virtual art space featuring the works of Filipino artists. Marahuyo offers programmed and curated content by working with its artists to reach audiences and collectors far beyond the confines of traditional galleries.

== Milestones & Shows ==
In 2009, CANVAS built the Salinlahi Park in Puerto Princesa, Palawan. This was in partnership with the Pacific Rim Park project, a nonprofit organization that built “friendship parks” along the Pacific Rim as a means of fostering understanding and goodwill.

The Art for Development Banner Project was launched in 2009. Known then as the Looking for Juan Outdoor Banner Project, it showcased different perspectives on Filipino identity through the works of local artists, graphic designers, and photographers. These works were printed onto banners and installed in accessible, pedestrian-friendly venues such as Philippine Pacific Rim Friendship Park in Puerto Princesa City, Palawan, and the University of the Philippines Diliman Academic Oval. This project encourages art appreciation in non-intimidating and relaxed environments.

From 2011 to 2017, CANVAS took part in organizing TEDXDiliman, an annual offshoot of the popular TED Conference. It put together speakers from various fields to share big ideas on culture and hope.

In March 2017, CANVAS commissioned an art installation by Mark Justiniani–a life-size barong-barong that was placed at the heart of University of the Philippines Diliman's Sunken Garden. This installation was called “The Settlement.” This outdoor piece showcased symbolic details like the retablo, a Mandala lantern, and a seemingly bottomless pit to capture specific moments in Philippine history. The historical moment in the spotlight was the impact of the Martial Law atrocities until today.

== Awards ==
CANVAS books have been recognized by local and international award-giving bodies.

Institution & Award	Year	Title	Author	Illustrator	Reference
National Book Award for Children's Literature	2007	The Boy Who Touched Heaven	Iris Gem Li	Sergio Bumatay III	
Gintong Aklat Award	2008	The Rocking Horse	Becky Bravo	Elmer Borlongan	
National Children's Book Awards Best Reads	2012	Doll Eyes	Eline Santos	Joy Mallari	
White Ravens Selection of International Children's and Youth Literature	2019	Ang Aklatang Pusa	Eugene Evasco	Jared Yotke	
White Ravens Selection of International Children's and Youth Literature	2020	Karapat Dapat	May Tobias-Papa	Ang INK	
National Children's Book Awards	2022	Kakatok-katok sa Bahay ni Benok	Mon Sy	Faye Abantao	
National Children's Book Awards	2022	Safe Space: A Kid's Guide to Data Privacy	Gigo Alampay	Abi Goy, Liza Flores, Frances Alvarez, and Jamie Bauza	
National Children's Book Awards	2022	#YOUTHink: Fight Fake News	Gigo Alampay	Abi Goy, Liza Flores, Frances Alvarez, and Jamie Bauza	
National Children's Book Awards Kids' Choice	2022	I am The Change in Climate Change	Alyssa M. Peleo-Alampay, PhD	Ang INK	
