= Agnes Bernauer =

Bavarian royal mistress

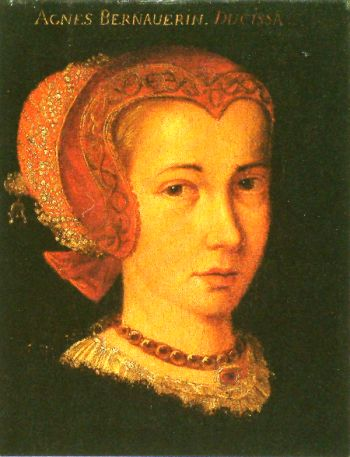
Agnes Bernauer (copy of a 16th-century work by an anonymous 18th century Augsburg painter)

Agnes Bernauer (c. 1410 – 12 October 1435) was the mistress and perhaps also the first wife of Albert, later Albert III, Duke of Bavaria. Because his father, Ernest, ruling Duke of Bavaria at the time, considered this liaison with a commoner unbefitting his son's social standing, he clashed with his son over the matter and finally arranged to have Agnes condemned for witchcraft and drowned in the Danube in 1435. Her life and death have been depicted in numerous literary works, the most well known being Friedrich Hebbel's tragedy of the same name and the folk musical Die Bernauerin by the composer Carl Orff.

== Biography ==
Agnes Bernauer was probably born around 1410; nothing is known of her childhood and youth. She is traditionally considered to have been the daughter of the Augsburg barber surgeon Kaspar Bernauer, whose existence has, however, not yet been proved. Since Ernest's son Albert participated in a tournament in Augsburg in February 1428, it is generally assumed that the latter met Agnes on that occasion and shortly thereafter brought her to Munich. In a Munich tax roll dated 1428, a "pernawin" is listed as a member of his royal household, which is probably a reference to Agnes Bernauer.

In summer 1432 at the latest, Agnes Bernauer was an integral part of the Munich court. She took part in the capture of the robber baron Münnhauser, who had fled to the Old Court in Munich, and she annoyed the Palatine Countess Beatrix, Albert's sister, because of her self-assured manner. It is possible that Agnes and Albert were already married at this point, but there is no concrete evidence of a marriage ceremony. Albert's frequent residence at Blutenburg Castle beginning in 1433 and the sale of two properties in the vicinity to Agnes suggest that the couple lived there together. There is no evidence of joint residence in Albert's county of Vohburg, and there are no known descendants of the couple.

Duke Ernest, Albert's father, was infuriated by the threat to the succession posed by his only son's unsuitable liaison. While Albert was on a hunt arranged by his relative Henry of Bavaria-Landshut, Duke Ernest had Agnes arrested and drowned in the Danube River on 12 October 1435 near Straubing. Albert then went to Ingolstadt to Duke Louis VII, but after a few months was reconciled with his father and married Anna of Brunswick in November 1436. The feared military conflict between father and son did not materialize; it is possible that Emperor Sigismund exerted a restraining effect on Albert.

== Tributes to her memory ==
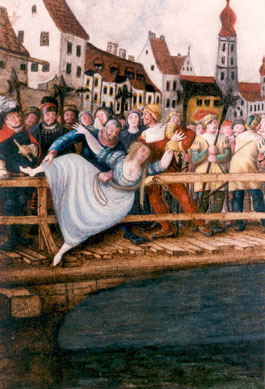
Death of Agnes Bernauer

In December 1435, Albert endowed a perpetual mass and an annual memorial celebration in the Straubing Carmelite Cloister in memory of Agnes Bernauer. In 1447 he expanded the endowment in her honor. In 1436, his father had an Agnes Bernauer Chapel erected in the cemetery of St. Peter Straubing, probably to appease his son. It is not known whether Agnes was buried in the Carmelite cloister, which was her wish, or whether Albert arranged for the transfer of her mortal remains to the chapel dedicated to her. In any event, a tombstone of red marble with an almost life-size effigy of Agnes Bernauer was fitted into the floor of the chapel. The relief shows her lying with her head on a large pillow. In her right hand, on which she wears two rings, she holds a rosary, and two small dogs at her feet are there to guide her on her way to the hereafter. It was probably an oversight that the year of her death is incorrectly given there as 12 October 1436.

There are only a few records about the memorial endowments for Agnes Bernauer from the next three centuries. In 1508 a certain Johannes Haberlander was the chaplain responsible for the Bernauer Chapel. For its maintenance and the daily reading of the memorial mass he received 17 pounds in Regensburg pence from the ducal treasury. By 1526 his office had been transferred to a Leonhard Plattner, who received for his services 48 guilders and 4 schilling in Viennese pence. It is not known how long the chaplain's office was maintained. All that is known is that the church trustee Franz von Paula Romayr had the tombstone moved to the wall of the chapel in 1785 in order to protect it from further damage "caused by depredatory footsteps". The grave itself could not be located when the tombstone was repositioned.

Nevertheless, at the beginning of the 19th century the Agnes Bernauer Chapel became a tourist destination. One newspaper (the Bayerische National-Zeitung) even asserted it as being the only reason to pay a visit to Straubing. The locals were happy to supply visitors with information, not all of it reliable. One concerned reader wrote to the Königlich-Bairische Intelligenzblatt in 1813 that the sexton had informed him that Austrian troops had walked off with the remains of Agnes Bernauer. When the German poet August von Platen inspected the gravestone in 1822, he heard from the female sexton that Agnes and Albert had been switched as infants so that she was actually the duke's daughter and he the son of the barber-surgeon, but that the book which would have confirmed this exchange had been stolen by French soldiers.

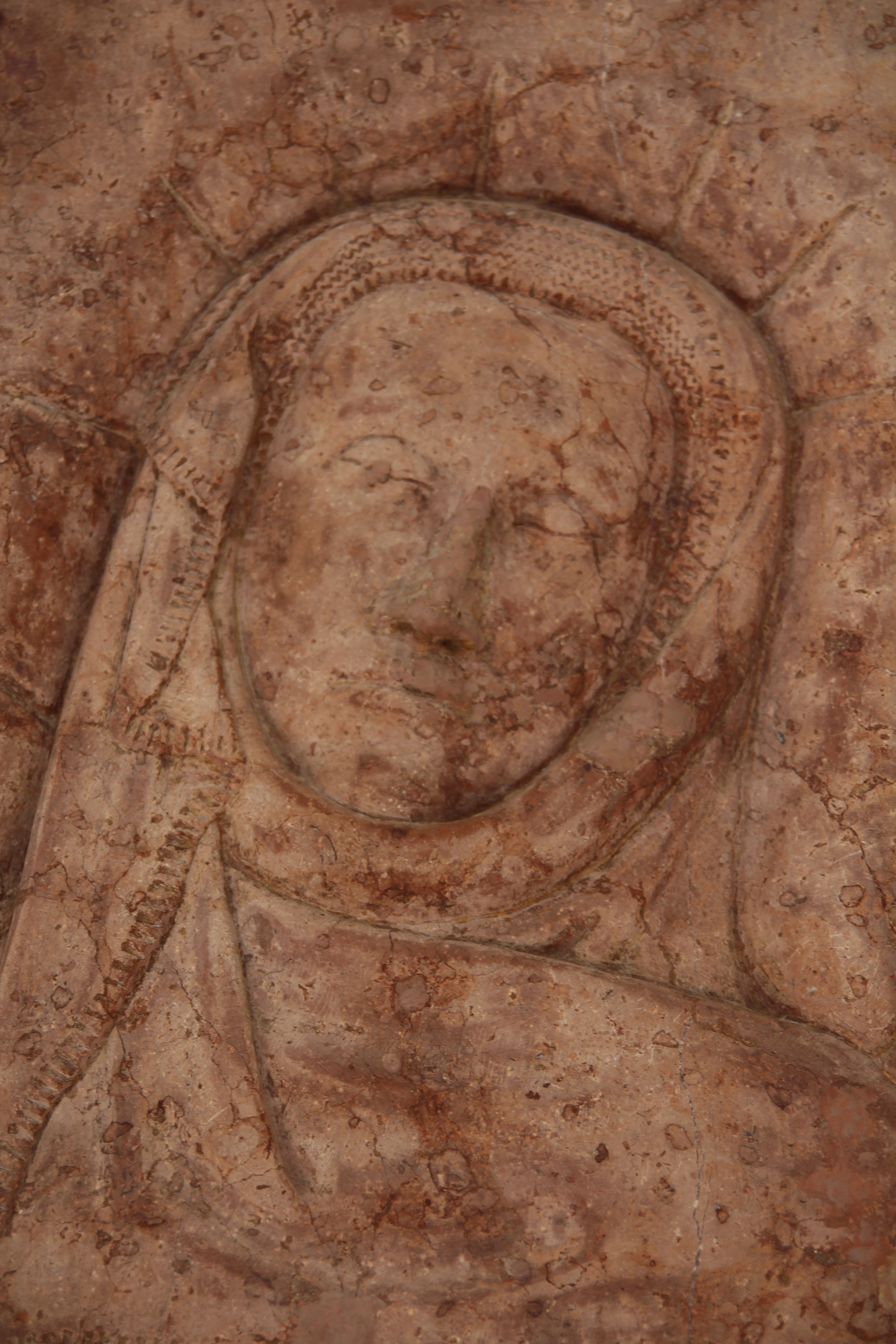
A detail of her epitaph in the Agnes Bernauer Chapel

After excavations in the Chapel at St. Peter failed to produce any results, the Bernauer biographer Felix Joseph Lipowsky had the Carmelite cloister grounds searched in 1897 for evidence of her grave. He found in the cloister archives a note indicating that the grave was in the former Nicholas chapel of the cloister church, but this chapel had been converted to a sacristy after 1692 and the vault underneath filled in. Lipowsky could only assume that her remains were reburied elsewhere during the reconstruction work. Despite subsequent searches, her grave remains undiscovered.

The Bavarian king Ludwig I, who had himself visited the Agnes Bernauer Chapel in 1812 when he was crown prince and later dedicated a poem to Agnes, saw to it that at least the masses for Agnes and Albert were again read in the Carmelite church. Since 1922, only one memorial mass is celebrated annually, due to financial limitations; it is paid for by the Bavarian government.

In 2013 at the Blutenburg Castle there was erected the Sculpture of Agnes Bernauer with Albert III, Duke of Bavaria by Joseph Michael Neustifter. The memorial was funded by Ursula und Fritz Heimbüchler.

In connection with the 1200th anniversary of the Obermenzing / Untermenzing (former Menzing) districts of Munich, on the stage belonging to the Temple "Leiden Christi" next to the Blutenburg Castle, in 2017 took place the premiere of the musical performance "Agnes or the Secret of the Blutenburg Castle", which presented a fantastic version of the fate of Agnes Bernauer.

== Adaptations ==
Albert and Agnes' tragic love story has long been a staple of folk songs, and over the centuries many new literary and musical versions have been created.

- Christian Hoffmann von Hoffmannswaldau: Liebe Zwischen Hertzog Ungenand und Agnes Bernin, Poem, 1680
- Joseph August Graf von Toerring: Agnes Bernauer, Vaterländisches Schauspiel, Play, 1780
- Georg Joseph Vogler (Music), Carl Theodor Traitteur (Libretto): Albert der Dritte von Bayern, Singspiel, UA Munich 1781
- Franz Gleißner (Music): Agnes Bernauerin, Melodrama, probably after Toerring, 1781, UA Munich 1790
- Ignaz von Seyfried (Music, Karl Ludwig Giesecke (Libretto): Agnes Bernauerin (burlesque), 1798
- Karl August Krebs (Music): Herzog Albrecht, Opera, UA Hamburg 8 October 1833 (revised version: Dresden 1858 as Agnes Bernauer)
- King Ludwig I of Bavaria: An Agnes Bernauerin, Poem
- Adolf Böttger: Agnes Bernauer, Drama, 1846
- Melchior Meyr: Herzog Albrecht, Drama, 1852
- Friedrich Hebbel: Agnes Bernauer - Ein deutsches Trauerspiel in fünf Aufzügen, Drama, 1855
- Otto Ludwig, several versions of a drama, 19th century
- Martin Greif: Agnes Bernauer oder der Engel von Augsburg, Drama, 1894
- Eugen Hubrich: Die Agnes Bernauer zu Straubing, Open-air Play, 1935. From 1952 to 1989, the play was adapted several times for the Agnes Bernauer Festival in Straubing. Until 1963, Hubrich made the changes himself.
- Hans Karl Meixner, Agnes Bernauer: Ein Leben voll Leid und Liebe: Roman. Reutlingen: Enßlin & Laiblin, Novel, 1937.
- Carl Orff: Die Bernauerin - Ein bairisches Stück, Folk Musical, 1944, UA Stuttgart 1947
- Raymond Bernard (Director), Bernard Zimmer (Screenplay), Joseph Kosma (Music): Le Jugement de Dieu, Historical Movie, 1949–51
- Michel Boisrond (Director), Jacques Prévert (Screenplay), France Roche (Screenplay), Maurice Jarre (Music): Famous Love Affairs, Anthology film, 1961, with Brigitte Bardot as Agnes Bernauer
- Karl Ristikivi. Nõiduse õpilane (The Student of Witchcraft). A novel in Estonian, 1967. Agnes Bernauer is one of the female main characters, causing political murder of the main character who is researcher and physician in the court of Dukes Ernst and Albrecht.
- Franz Xaver Kroetz: Agnes Bernauer, Play, 1976
- Manfred Böckl: Agnes Bernauer. Hexe, Hur' und Herzogin. Novel, 1993 ISBN 3-924484-63-5
- Thomas Stammberger und Johannes Reitmeier: Agnes Bernauer - Ein Historienspiel in fünfzehn Bildern, Open-air Play, 1995 (2003 and 2007 revised by Johannes Reitmeier)
- Richard Wunderer: Agnes Bernauer und ihr Herzog. Rosenheimer, Rosenheim 1999 ISBN 3-475-52940-8
