= Ulrich, Duke of Württemberg =

Duke of Württemberg

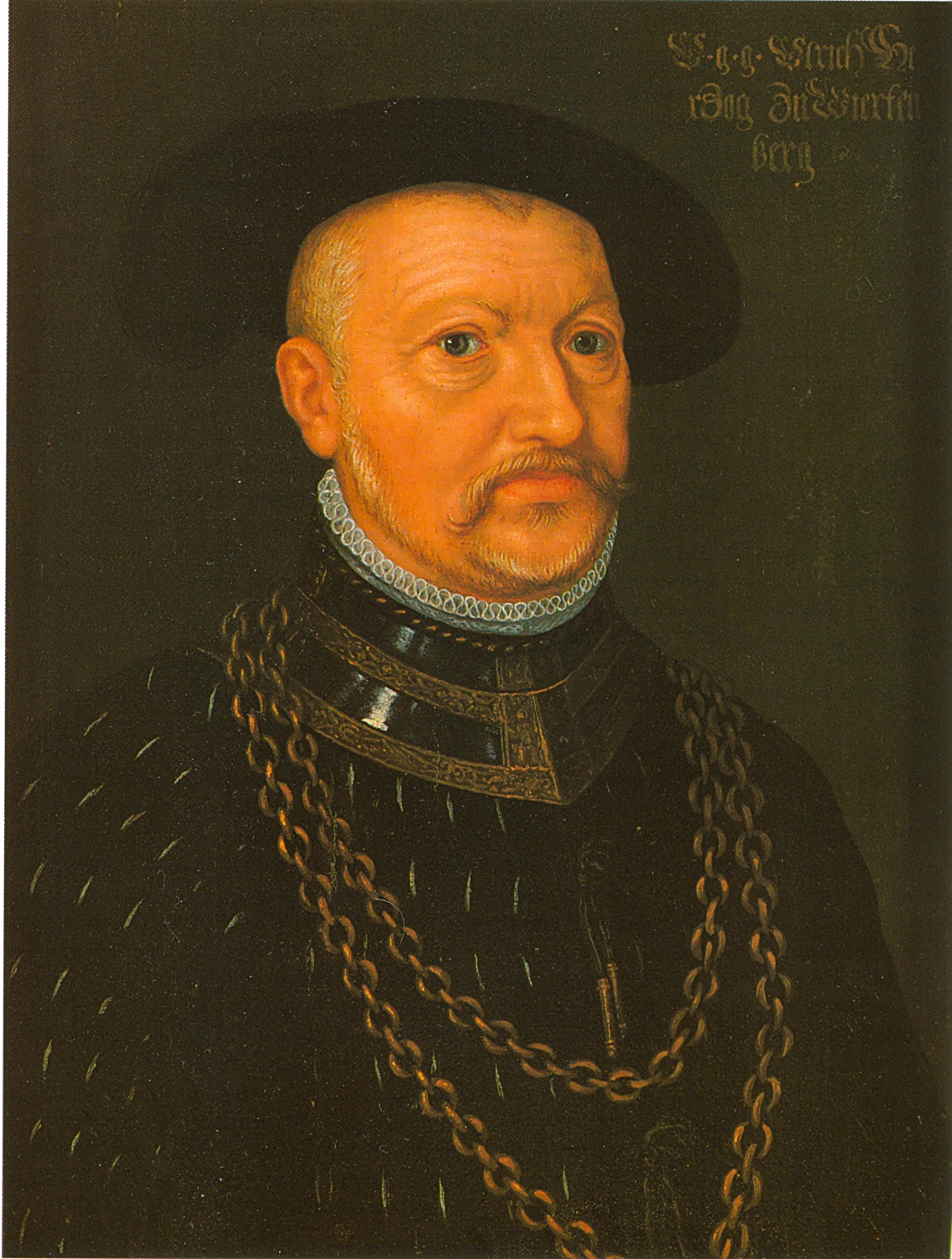
- Portrait of Ulrich, 16th century
- Born: 8 February 1487; Riquewihr, Alsace
- Died: 6 November 1550 (aged 63); Tübingen
- Noble family: House of Württemberg
- Spouse: Sabina of Bavaria
- Issue: Christoph, Duke of Württemberg; Anna of Württemberg
- Father: Henry, Count of Württemberg
- Mother: Elisabeth of Zweibrücken-Bitsch

Duke Ulrich of Württemberg (8 February 1487 – 6 November 1550) succeeded his kinsman Eberhard II as Duke of Württemberg in 1498. He was declared of age in 1503. His volatile personality made him infamous, being called the "Swabian Henry VIII" by historians.

== Early life ==
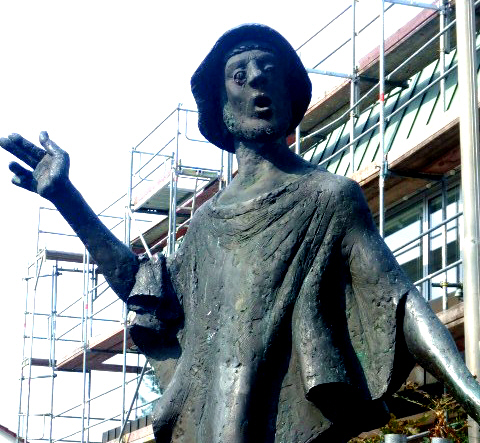
Statue of Peter Gaiss, leader of the "Poor Conrad" rebellion in the Rems Valley

Duke Ulrich was born 8 February 1487 and his mother died in his birth. His father, Henry, Count of Württemberg, was mentally deranged, likely as a result of his three-year imprisonment by Duke Charles the Bold of Burgundy, was banished to Hohenurach Castle in the County of Urach, and his only guardian died when he was nine years of age.

Ulrich served the German king, Maximilian I, in the War of the Succession of Landshut in 1504, receiving some additions to Württemberg as a reward. He accompanied Maximilian on his unfinished journey to Rome in 1508, and he marched with the imperial army into France in 1513 and besieged Dijon.

Meanwhile, in Württemberg Ulrich had become very unpopular. His extravagance had led to a large accumulation of debt, and his subjects were irritated by his oppressive methods of raising money. In 1514 an uprising under the name of Poor Conrad broke out, and was only suppressed after Ulrich had made important concessions to the estates in return for financial aid. The duke's relations with the Swabian League, moreover, were very bad, and trouble soon came from another quarter also.

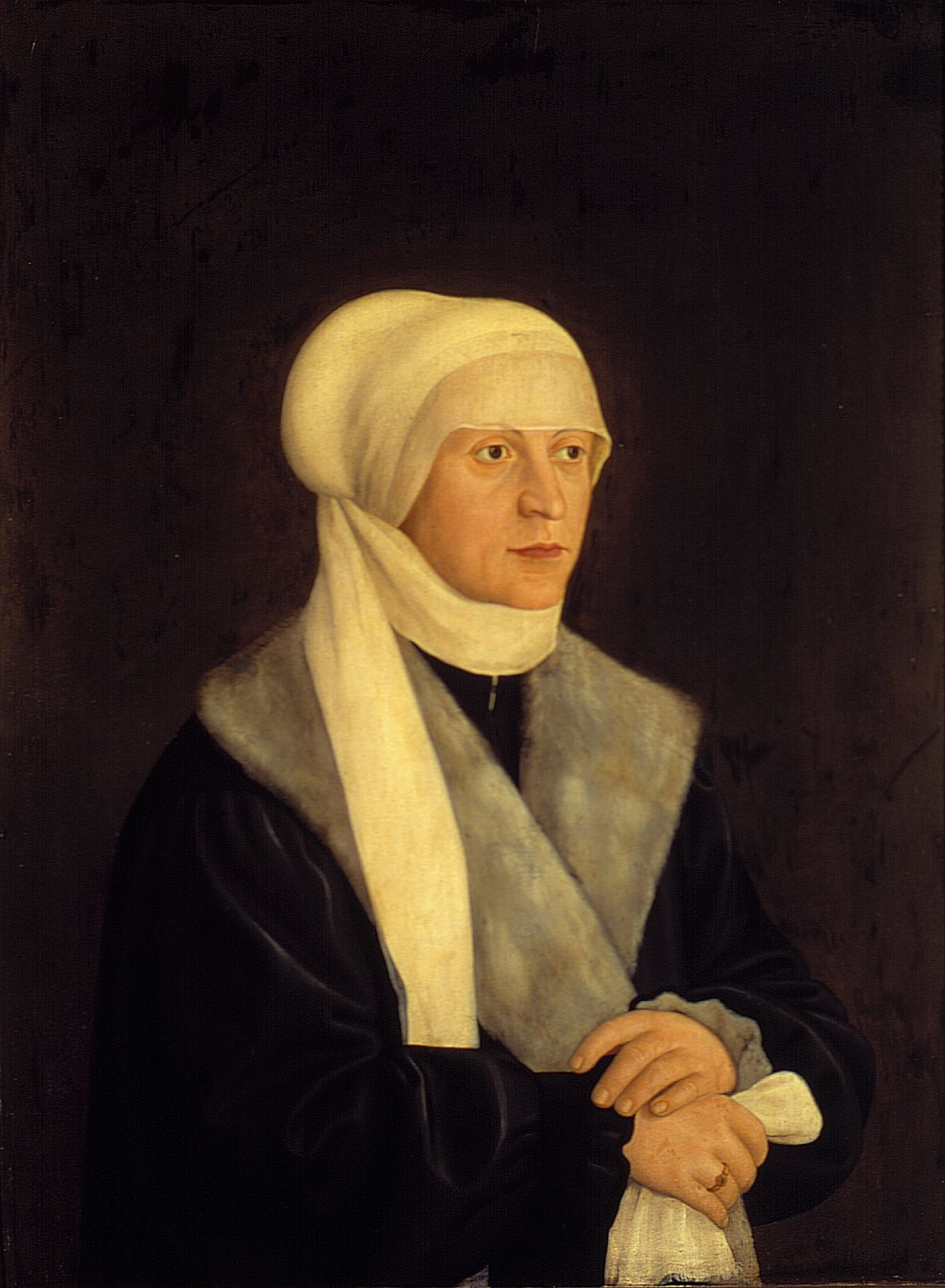
Portrait of Duchess Sabina of Bavaria by Barthel Beham, 1530

In 1511 Ulrich had married Sabina, a daughter of Albert IV, Duke of Bavaria, and niece of the Emperor Maximilian. The marriage was a very unhappy one, and having formed an affection for the wife of a knight named Hans von Hutten, a kinsman of Ulrich von Hutten, the duke killed Hans in 1515 during an altercation. Hutten's friends now joined the other elements of discontent. Fleeing from her husband, Sabina won the support of the emperor and of her brother William IV, Duke of Bavaria, and Ulrich was twice placed under the imperial ban. After the death of Maximilian in January 1519 the Swabian League interfered in the struggle, and Ulrich was driven from Württemberg, which was afterwards sold by the league to Charles V, Holy Roman Emperor.

== In exile ==
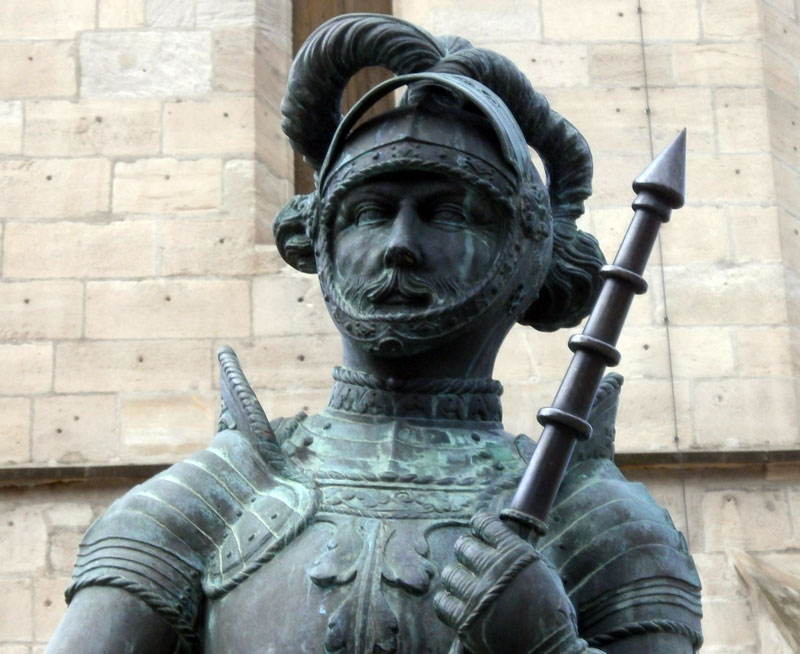
Statue of Ulrich in Balingen (Zollernalbkreis)

Ulrich passed some time in Switzerland, France and Germany, occupied with brigand exploits and in service under Francis I of France; but he never lost sight of the possibility of recovering Württemberg and about 1523 he announced his conversion to the reformed faith. His opportunity came with the outbreak of the German Peasants' War. Posing as the friend of the lower orders and signing himself "Ulrich the peasant", his former oppressions were forgotten and his return was anticipated with joy. Collecting men and money, mainly in France and Switzerland, he invaded Württemberg in February 1525, but the Swiss in his service were recalled owing to the defeat of Francis I of France at Pavia; the peasantry were unable to give him any serious support, and in a few weeks he was again a fugitive.

During his exile Ulrich had formed a friendship with Philip I, Landgrave of Hesse; and his restoration, undertaken by Philip, is an event of some importance in the political history of the Reformation. In 1526 Philip had declared he was anxious to restore the exiled duke, and about the same time Francis I and Zwingli had intimated their willingness to assist in a general attack upon the Habsburgs. Many difficulties, however, barred the way, and it was 1534 before Philip was prepared to strike.

== Restoration ==
In January of that year Francis I had definitely promised assistance; the Swabian League had just been dissolved; and, after a manifesto had been issued by Ulrich and Philip justifying the proposed undertaking, Württemberg was invaded in April 1534. Charles V and his brother, King Ferdinand I, could send but little assistance to their lieutenants, and on the 13 May the troops of the Habsburgs were completely defeated at the Battle of Lauffen. In a few weeks Ulrich was restored, and in June 1534 a treaty was negotiated at Kaaden by which he was recognized as duke by Ferdinand, but was to hold Württemberg under Austrian suzerainty. After some hesitation Ulrich yielded to the solicitations of Philip, and signed the treaty in February 1535.

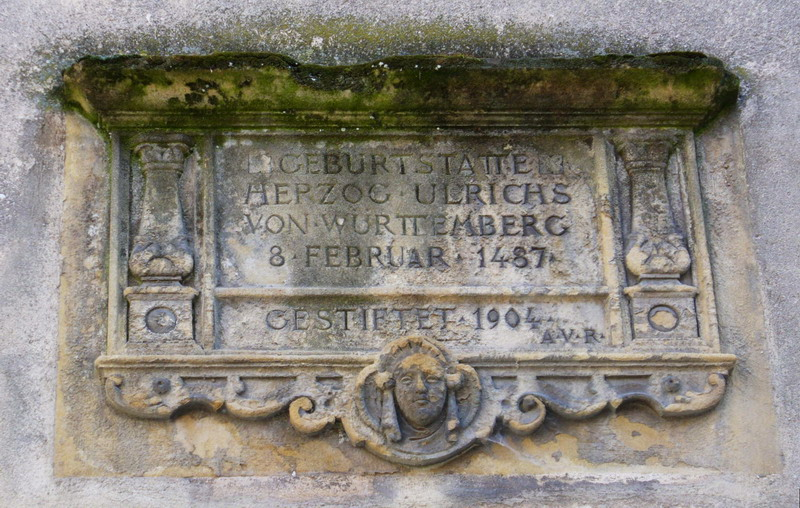
Plaque in Reichenweiher in Alsace

The duke now lost no time in pressing on the teaching of the reformed doctrines of Luther and Zwingli. Many convents and monasteries were destroyed, and extensive seizures of church property formed a welcome addition to his impoverished exchequer (this act was precisely simultaneous with the similar Dissolution of the Monasteries undertaken by King Henry VIII of England).

Taxation, however, was so heavy that he soon lost his temporary popularity. In April 1536 he joined the Schmalkaldic League, though he did not assent to some of the schemes of Philip of Hesse for attacking Charles V. In 1546 his troops fought against the Emperor during the Schmalkaldic War, but with disastrous results for Württemberg. The duchy was quickly overrun, and the duke compelled to agree to the Treaty of Heilbronn in January 1547. By this treaty, Charles, ignoring the desire of Ferdinand to depose Ulrich again, allowed him to retain his duchy, but stipulated that he should pay a large sum of money, surrender certain fortresses, and appear as a suppliant before the Emperor at Ulm. Having submitted under compulsion to the Augsburg Interim in May 1548, Ulrich died on 6 November 1550 at Tübingen, where he was buried. He left a son, Christopher (1515–1568), who succeeded him.

== Ancestors ==
Ancestors of Ulrich, Duke of Württemberg

8. Eberhard IV, Count of Württemberg
4. Ulrich V, Count of Württemberg
9. Henriette of Mömpelgard
2. Henry, Count of Württemberg
10. Henry XVI, Duke of Bavaria
5. Elisabeth of Bavaria-Landshut
11. Margarete of Austria
1. Ulrich, Duke of Württemberg
12. Frederick II of Zweibrücken-Bitsch
6. Simon VII Wecker, Count of Zweibrücken-Bitsch
13. Anna of Neuenbamberg-Salm
3. Elisabeth of Zweibrücken-Bitsch
14. Louis V of Lichtenberg
7. Elisabeth of Lichtenberg
15. Elisabeth of Hohenlohe

== Sources ==
- Hohkamp, Michaela (2007). "Sisters, Aunts, and Cousins: Familial Architectures and the Political Field in Early Modern Europe". In Sabean, David Warren; Teuscher, Simon; Mathieu, Jon (eds.). Kinship in Europe: Approaches to Long-Term Development (1300-1900). Berghahn books. pp. 91–104.
- Marcus, Kenneth H. (2000). Politics of Power: Elites of an Early Modern State in Germany. Mainz, Germany: Verlag Philipp von Zabern. ISBN 3-8053-2534-7.

Ulrich, Duke of Württemberg House of Württemberg Born: 8 February 1487 Died: 6 November 1550
Regnal titles
Preceded by Eberhard II	Duke of Württemberg; 1498-1519 and 1534-1550; 1519 to 1534 exiled in Switzerland and Montbéliard	Succeeded by Christoph
