= Sigismund, Duke of Bavaria =

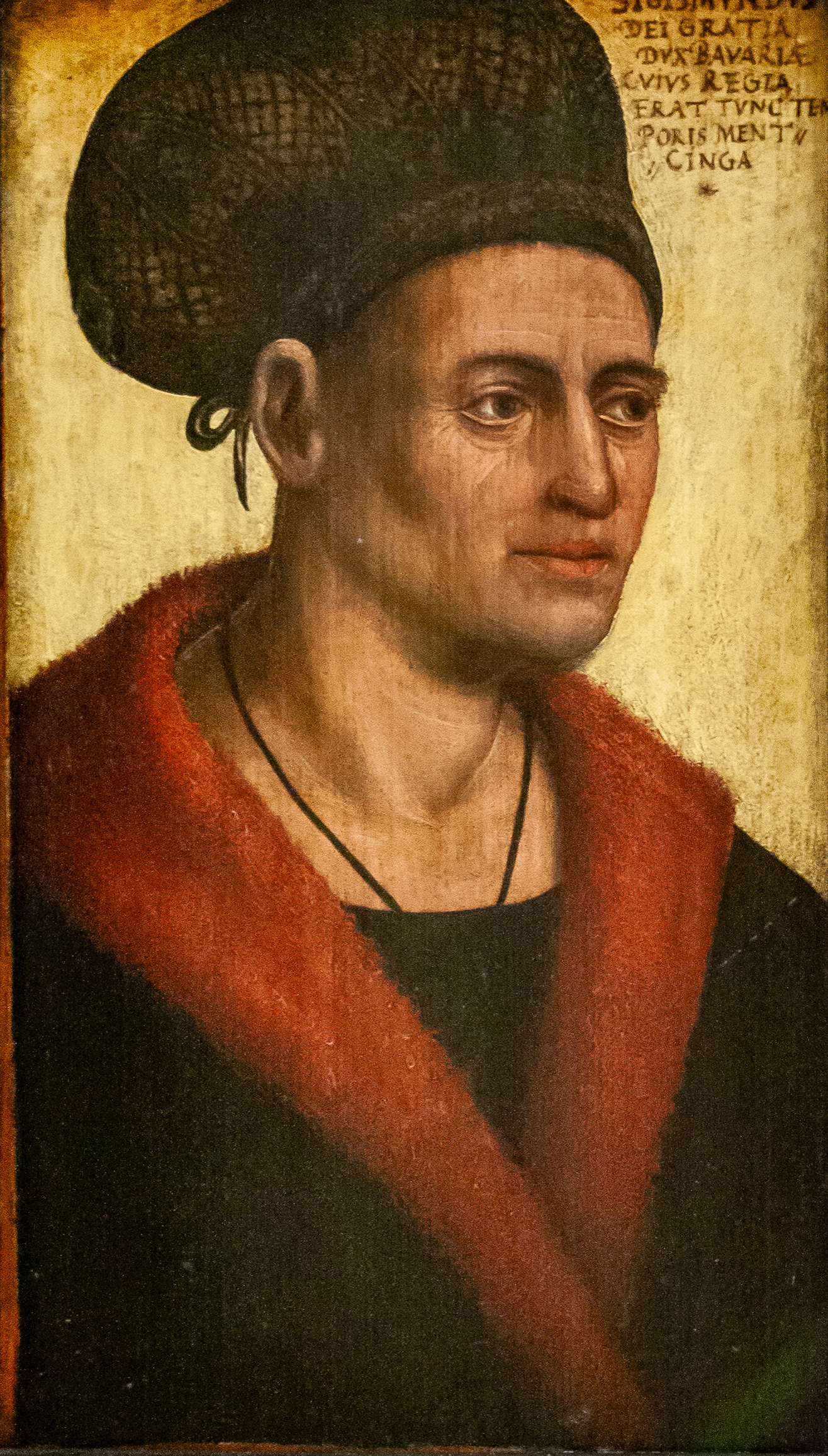
Sigismund of Bavaria, portrait by Jan Polack

Sigismund of Bavaria (26 July 1439 – 1 February 1501) was a member of the Wittelsbach dynasty. He ruled as Duke of Bavaria-Munich from 1460 to 1467, and then as Duke of Bavaria-Dachau until his death.

== Biography ==
Sigismund was the third son of Albert III of Bavaria with Princess Anna of Brunswick-Grubenhagen-Einbeck, his second wife.

Sigismund was Duke of Bavaria-Munich from 1460 to 1467, until 1463 together with his brother John IV. In 1467, he resigned in favor of his younger brother Albert IV and then kept only the new duchy of Bavaria-Dachau as his domain until his death.

In 1468, the foundation stone of the Frauenkirche in Munich was laid by Sigismund. He also ordered to enlarge Blutenburg Castle, to construct its chapel, and to build the church St. Wolfgang in Pipping nearby in 1488. The redesign of the ducal court Alter Hof was initiated by Sigismund as well who lived there for a time towards the end of the 15th Century and was generally a patron of the revival of Gothic arts in Bavaria.

Sigismund died on February 1, 1501, at Blutenburg Castle, Bavaria and was buried at the Frauenkirche in Munich.

== Ancestors ==
Ancestors of Sigismund, Duke of Bavaria

8. John II, Duke of Bavaria
4. Ernest, Duke of Bavaria
9. Catherine of Gorizia
2. Albert III, Duke of Bavaria
10. Bernabò Visconti
5. Elisabetta Visconti
11. Beatrice Regina della Scala
1. Sigismund, Duke of Bavaria
12. Albert I, Duke of Brunswick-Grubenhagen
6. Eric I, Duke of Brunswick-Grubenhagen
13. Agnes of Brunswick-Lüneburg
3. Anna of Brunswick-Grubenhagen-Einbeck
14. Otto I, Duke of Brunswick-Göttingen
7. Elisabeth of Brunswick-Göttingen
15. Margaret of Jülich

Sigismund, Duke of Bavaria House of Wittelsbach Born: 1439 Died: 1501
German royalty
Regnal titles
Preceded by Albert III	Duke of Bavaria-Munich; 1460–1467	Succeeded by Albert IV
