= White Ravens =

Youth literature catalogue

The White Ravens is a catalog published annually in English by the International Youth Library as a recommendation list for international children's and youth literature. The most recent White Ravens catalog is presented each year in October at the Frankfurt Book Fair and the following spring at the Bologna Children's Book Fair in Italy. The first catalog was issued in 1986.

== Selection ==
From the large quantity of the review and donation copies, which the library receives from publishing houses, institutions, organizations and other friends of the library, the language specialists (lektors) select 200 new releases from over 40 countries in more than 30 languages. The White Raven label is given to books which are chosen "based on the universal relevance of the themes they address, their literary and pictorial qualities, or their innovative approaches or design."

Each title listed in the catalog is briefly described with a short annotation and several keywords that capture content and genre, as well as a notation for suggested reader age level. The catalogs contain a name index, subject index and reading age index. In earlier editions, identification symbols for "Special Mentions", for books found to contribute to intercultural communication, and for easy-to-read texts were added to some annotations.

== Online access to catalog ==
An online database of titles in the catalogs from 2012 to the current year is hosted on the website of the IYL. It includes an advanced search facility by catalog year.

== White Ravens Festival ==
Beginning in 2010 the International Youth Library has organised a biennial week-long programme of readings and book-related events by invited authors and illustrators from Germany and countries around the world. These take place on the grounds of Blutenburg Castle as well as in schools, libraries and cultural venues throughout the state of Bavaria. The guest authors have often won awards in their home countries, even if their works have not been selected for presentation in the White Ravens catalog. The 7th White Ravens Festival was held in July 2023 and included a programme of 13 authors performing multiple readings at over 60 venues.
