= Löwlerbund =

The Löwlerbund ("League of the Lion") was a Adelsgesellschaft ("noble society") based in the Bavarian Forest and Lower Bavaria. It was formed in 1489 by Bavarian knights to oppose their lord, Duke Albert IV, who had claimed the right to levy taxes on them without their consent. The League moved into formal rebellion on 9 December 1491, under the leadership of Sigmund von Sattelbogen. It received support from Emperor Frederick III and the Swabian League, but was repeatedly defeated. In a peace agreement on 7 August 1493, Albert IV conceded the point on taxation and the League was disbanded.

== Background ==
By 1466, the knights of the Bavarian Forest had banded together as the Böcklerbund under the leadership of Hans von Degenberg, which was defeated by Duke Albert in the Böckler War in 1468–1469. At that point, Albert had enjoyed the full backing of Emperor Frederick III, but he subsequently achieved a substantial increase in power and eventually made an enemy of the emperor, who ordered the establishment of the Swabian League in 1487 to oppose him.

At a Landtag in Munich in 1488, Albert demanded the "travel money" which he needed to raise a mercenary army to fight the Swabian League. The knights, who were accustomed to fulfil their duties to their lord through military service, refused this demand. As a result, the Duke ordered that the Hintersassen tax by collected by force and had it proclaimed that the Duke had the right to raise taxes without the permission of the Landschaften.

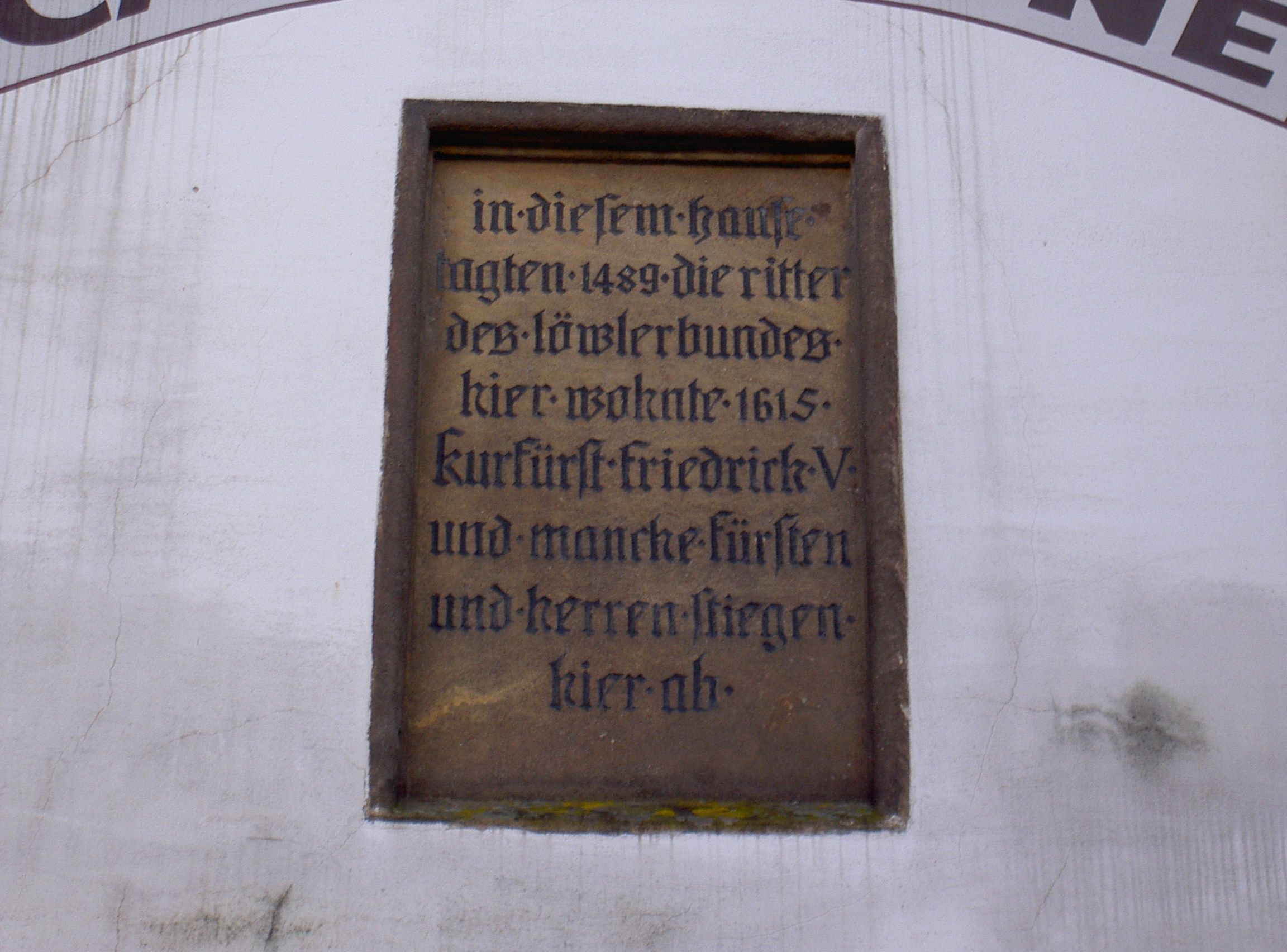
Cham Marktplatz 4, commemorative plaque on the site of the Gasthof Krone

== Foundation of the league ==
As a result, 46 representatives of the knighthood of Straubinger Ländchen and neighbouring regions gathered at the inn Gasthof Krone in the marketplace of Cham on 14 July 1489 and formed the Löwlerbund ("League of the Lion"). This was implicitly a declaration of war against Duke Albert.

As a symbol, the knights wore a golden lion on a chain with 16 links; the esquires wore a silver one. The members included the knights of Degenberg, Nussberg, Notthafft, Sattelbogen, Murach, Parsberg, Stauffer zu Ehrenfels, Chamerau, Rain, Türling, and others. The pfleger of Cham, Sebastian Pflugk von Rabenstein was elected as leader. Otto II, Count Palatine of Mosbach-Neumarkt, and Duke Albert's brothers, Christopher and Wolfgang, also joined.

However, in 1490, Otto II switched to Duke Albert's side. The League allied itself with the Swabian League on 15 September 1490 and on 2 October 1490, King Vladislaus of Bohemia promised to support the league for fifteen years. At an Imperial Diet at Nürnberg in 1491, the 13-man delegation from the Löwlerbund came to blows with the Duke. King Maximilian I, whose attempts to mediate between the parties proved fruitless, accepted the foundation of the Löwlerbund and its alliance with the Swabian league on 6 July 1491. On 1 October 1491, Emperor Frederick III imposed the imperial ban on the city of Regensburg, which had gone over to Albert, and entrusted the enforcement of the ban to the Löwlerbund.

== Course of the war ==
On 9 December 1491, Sigmund von Sattelbogen, who controlled Lichtenegg castle, issued a formal letter of rebellion to Duke Albert, along with the knight Elsenbeck. The brothers Hieronymus and Bernhardin von Stauf snuck out on the night of the 12–13 December 1491 and plundered the Ducal village of Pfatter.

In response, Duke Albert hired Bohemian nobles. He set out on 21 December, with troops sent in support of him by Count Otto and the city of Nürnberg. On 24 December, he reached Köfering, forced Hieronymus von Stauff to surrender and destroyed the castle and village on 26 December. He pillaged the villages of the Stauff, Elsenbeck at Schloss Gitting and Sattelbogen families.

Prunn Castle under Wolf Frauenberger was stormed by the Duke's troops in December 1491. On 5 January, Flügelsberg, the castle of the Parsberg family, was taken. On 23 January 1492, Duke Albert took Sigmund von Sattelbogen and Stephan Mausheimer captive, along with sixty knights, when he captured Ehrenfels Castle. However, Sigmund was released by August. In 1492, Albert besieged Traubling Castle in Niedertraubling. The castle was only saved because King Maximilian made peace with Duke Albert while the siege was still in progress.

== Peace agreement ==
On 23 January 1492, Emperor Frederick renewed the imperial ban against Regensburg and also denounced all allies of the city, especially Duke Albert. When the army of the Swabian League appeared at Augsburg, King Maximilian mediated a settlement between 13 and 25 May, whereby Albert agreed to surrender Regensburg and other lands.

The Löwlerbund continued its conflict with Albert, but he placed Falkenfels castle under siege on 8 June 1492, capturing it after eight days. Many of the knights of the League were taken captive and the castle was burnt to the ground.

A meeting to negotiate terms was eventually scheduled for 10 April 1493 in Munich. Only nine knights of the Löwlerbund showed up: Bernhardin and Hieronymus von Stauf zu Ernfels, Erasmus Paulsdorfer, Jörg Paulsdorfer, Heinrich and Kaspar Nothafft, Jörg Parsberger, Albrecht von Murach, and Sigmund von Sattelbogen (who had submitted the most complaints and therefore made a separate pact).

The negotiations were finally concluded on 7 August 1493. The most important item was a guarantee that the general Landesfreiheit (freedom of the land) would remain in force and that conflicts regarding its interpretation would resolved by the Landschaft assembly. This fulfilled the demand that had originally spurred the creation of the league and it now ceased to exist. There were no reparations for property lost or destroyed during the conflict.

== Bibliography ==
- Franz v. Krenner (Bearb.): Baierische Landtags-Handlungen in den Jahren 1429 bis 1513. Munich 1804.
  - Vol. 8: Oberländische Landtäge im Münchener Landantheile. Unter der Allein-Regierung des Herzogs Albrecht des IV. von 1470 bis zum Ursprunge des Löwlerbundes 1488.
  - Vol. 10: Niederländische Landtäge im Straubinger Landantheile. Unter der Alleinregierung Herzog Albrechts des IV. vom Jahre 1470 anfangend, mit eingeschalteter Geschichte des Löwlerbundes, bis zum Augsburger Vertrag 1492.
  - Vol. 11: Niederländische Landtäge im Straubinger Landantheile. Fortsetzung der Geschichte des Löwlerbundes bis an ihr Ende 1493 – und dann die weiteren Landtagshandlungen bis zum allgemeinen Landesverein 1505.
- Joseph Anton von Mussinan: Geschichte des Löwler Bundes unter dem baierischen Herzog Albert IV. vom Jahre 1488 bis 1495. Verlag Lindauer, Munich 1817.
- Max Piendl: "Die Ritterbünde der Böckler und Löwler im bayerischen Wald." in Alois Fink, Paul Ernst Rattelmüller (ed.): Unbekanntes Bayern, Band 5: Burgen, Schlösser, Residenzen. Süddeutscher Verlag, München 1975, ISBN 3-7991-5839-1, pp. 72–81
- Otto Geyer: "Der Aufstand der Böckler und Löwler." Der Bayerwald, vol. 64 (1972), no. 3, pp. 121–142, ISSN 0405-0851
- Andreas Zeitler: Zwischen Fürstenmacht und Ritterfreiheit. Die Ritterbünde der Böckler und Löwler in Ostbayern. Publishing house "Der Neue Tag", Amberg 1989, ISBN 3-924350-17-5.
- Willi Straßer: "Zur Geschichte des Löwlerbundes. Eine Ritterrebellion vor 500 Jahren." in Die Oberpfalz, vol. 77 (1989), pp. 360–363, ISSN 0342-9873
- Max Heigl: "Der Löwlerbund von 1489. Eine Adelsfronde gegen Fürstenwillkür." In: Damals, no. 23 (1991), pp. 151–171, ISSN 0011-5908
- Hans-Josef Krey: Herrschaftskrisen und Landeseinheit. Die Straubinger und Münchner Landstände unter Herzog Albrecht IV. von Bayern-München (Berichte aus der Geschichtswissenschaft). Verlag Shaker, Aachen 2005, ISBN 3-8322-3937-5 (at the same time dissertation, Catholic University of Eichstätt-Ingolstadt 2000).
- Viktor Martin Otto Denk, Josef Weiß: Unser Bayerland. Geschichte volkstümlich dargestellt. Allgemeine Verlagsgesellschaft, Munich 1906.
