= Anna of Brunswick-Grubenhagen =

German noblewoman

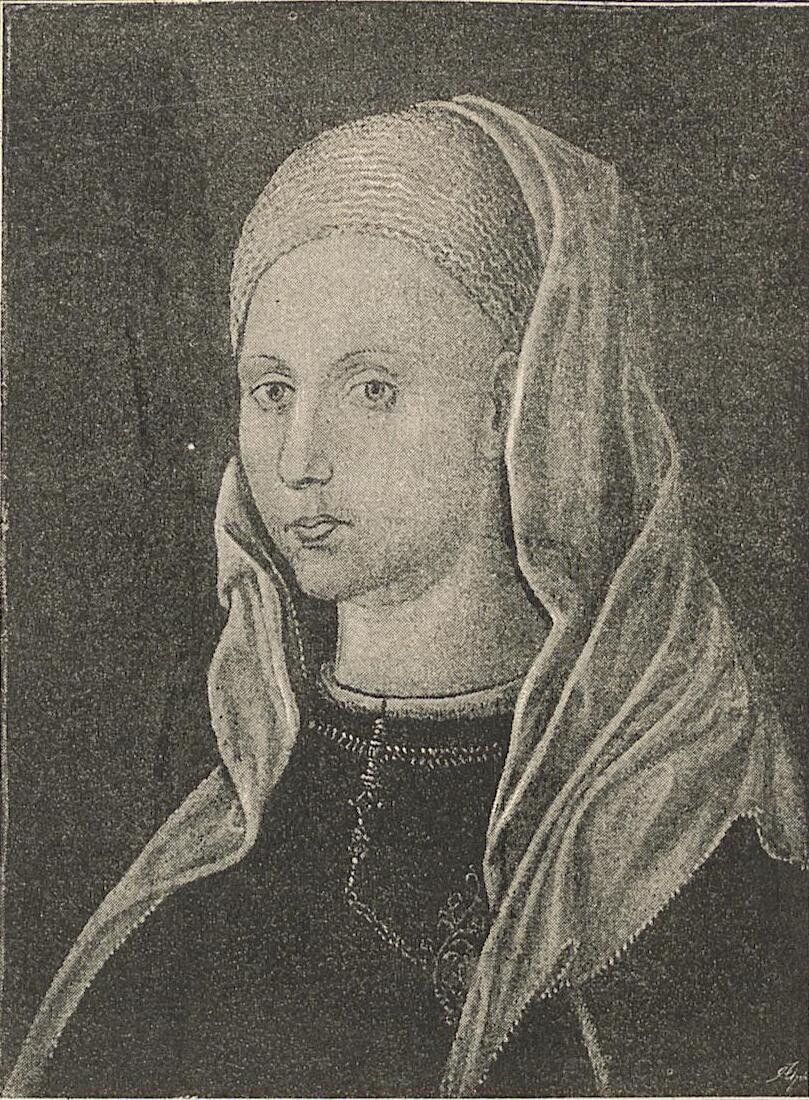
- Born: c. 1420
- Died: 9 October 1474; Nannhofen
- Resting place: Andechs Abbey
- Spouse(s): Albert III of Bavaria, Frederick III of Brunswick-Lüneburg
- Children: John IV of Bavaria, Sigismund, Duke of Bavaria, Margaret of Bavaria, Elisabeth of Bavaria, Electress of Saxony, Albert IV of Bavaria, Christoph the Strong
- Parents: Eric I of Brunswick-Grubenhagen (father); Elisabeth of Brunswick-Göttingen (mother)

Anna of Brunswick-Grubenhagen-Einbeck (c. 1420 – 9 October 1474) was a German noblewoman. She was the daughter of Duke Eric I of Brunswick-Grubenhagen and Elisabeth of Brunswick-Göttingen, daughter of Otto I, Duke of Brunswick-Göttingen.

== Marriages and issue ==
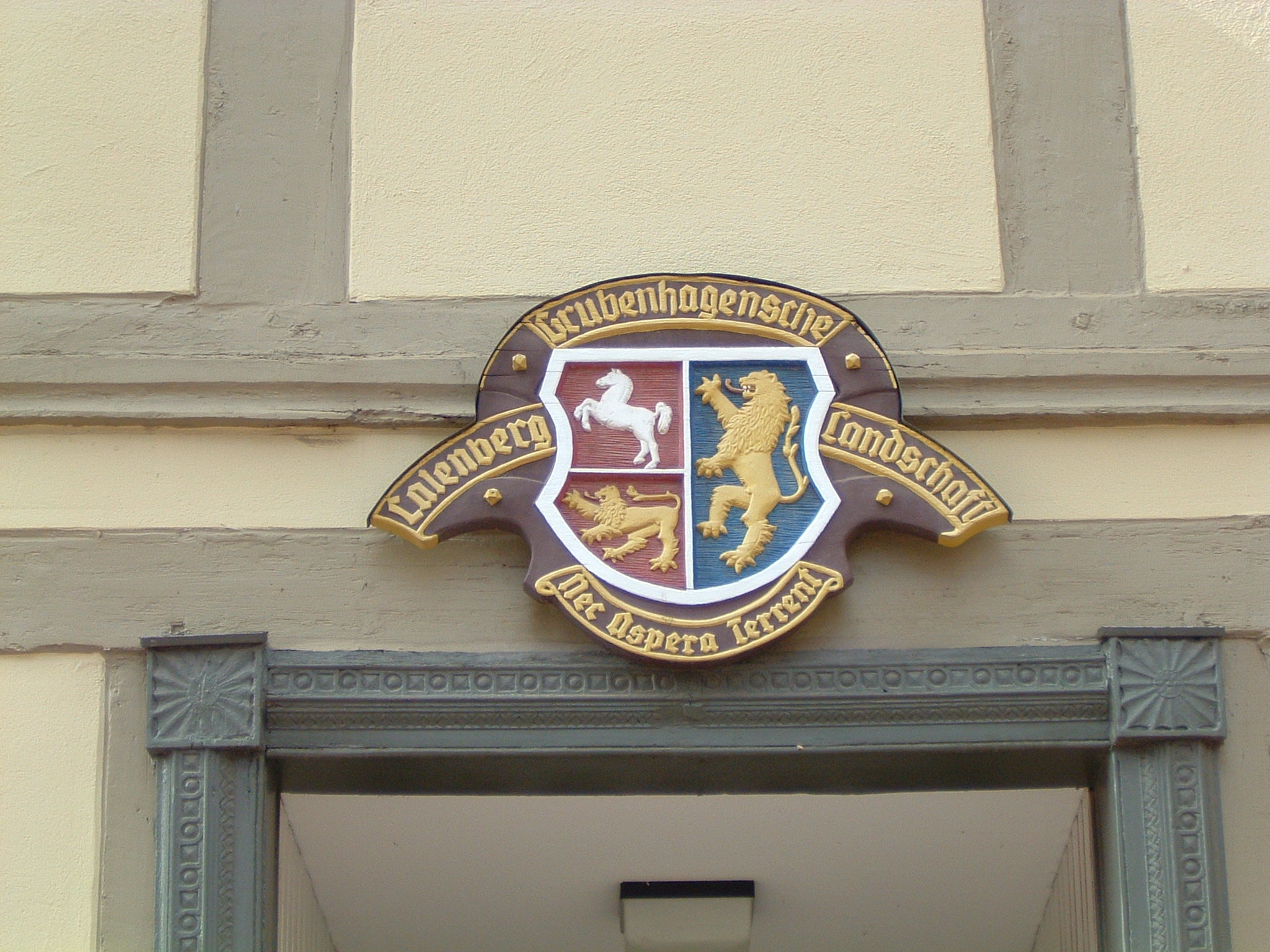

Anna's first marriage was with Duke Albert III of Bavaria. They had ten children:

- John IV (1437–1463), Duke of Bavaria
- Ernest (1438–1460)
- Sigismund of Bavaria (1439–1501)
- Albert (1440–1445)
- Margaretha (1442–1479), married in 1463 with Marquess Frederick I of Mantua
- Elisabeth (1443–1484), married in 1460 with Elector Ernest of Saxony (1441–1486)
- Albert IV (1447–1508)
- Christopher (1449–1493)
- Wolfgang (1451–1514)
- Barbara, a nun in Munich

After Albert's death, she married Duke Frederick III of Brunswick-Calenberg-Göttingen. This marriage remained childless.

== Ancestors ==
Ancestors of Anna of Brunswick-Grubenhagen

8. Ernest I, Duke of Brunswick-Grubenhagen
4. Albert I, Duke of Brunswick-Grubenhagen
9. Adelheid of Eberstein
2. Eric I, Duke of Brunswick-Grubenhagen
10. Magnus II, Duke of Brunswick-Lüneburg
5. Agnes of Brunswick-Lüneburg
11. Catherine of Anhalt-Bernburg
1. Anna of Brunswick-Grubenhagen-Einbeck
12. Ernest I, Duke of Brunswick-Göttingen
6. Otto I, Duke of Brunswick-Göttingen
13. Elisabeth of Hesse
3. Elisabeth of Brunswick-Göttingen
14. William VII of Jülich, 1st Duke of Berg
7. Margaret of Jülich
15. Anna of the Palatinate

== Sources ==
- James, Carolyn (2020). A Renaissance Marriage: The Political and Personal Alliance of Isabella d'Este & Francesco Gonzaga, 1490-1519. Oxford University Press.
