= Albert IV of Bavaria =

Duke of Bavaria from 1503 to 1508

Albert IV
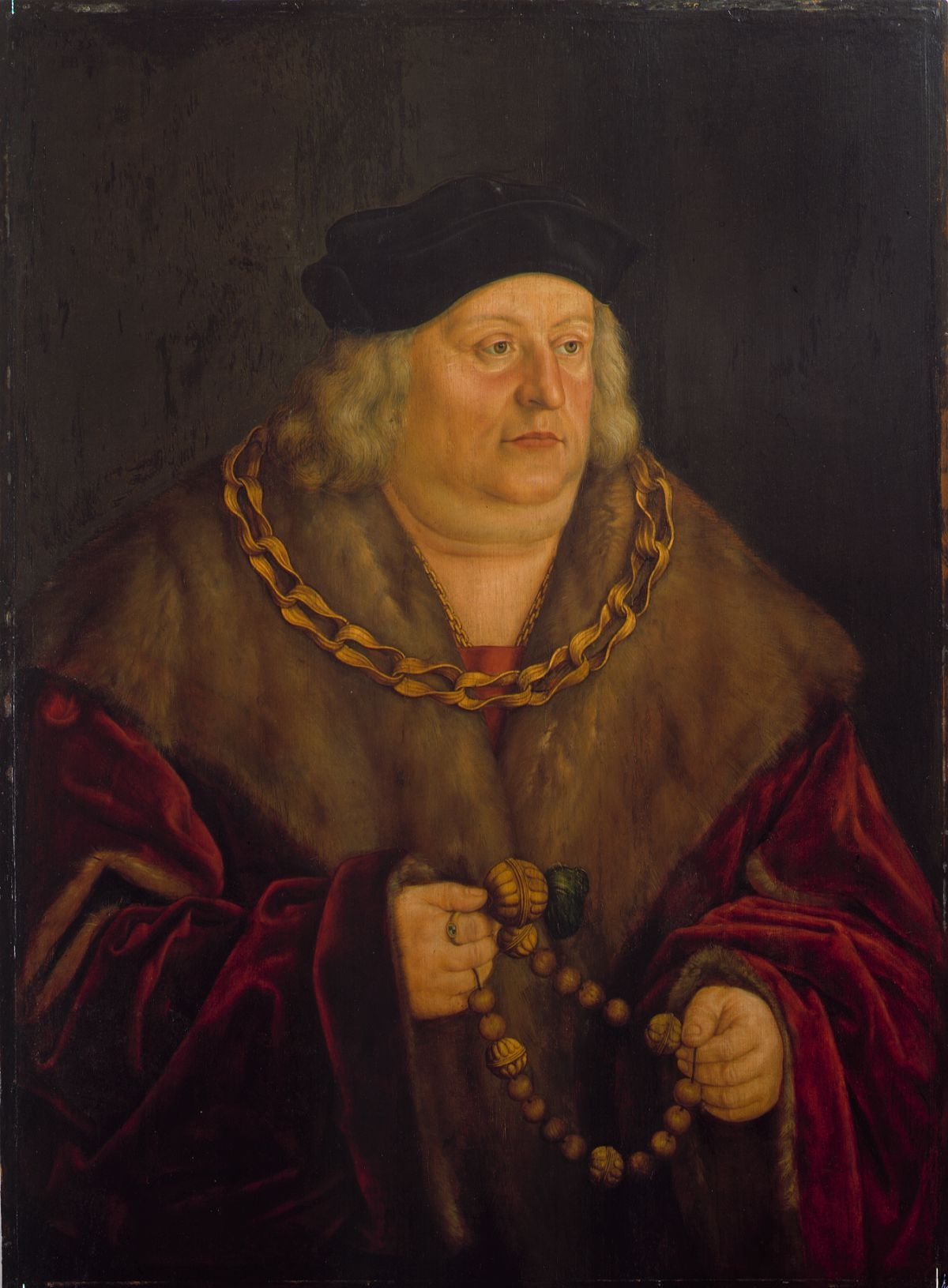
- Portrait by Barthel Beham

Duke of Bavaria
- Reign: 1 December 1503 – 18 March 1508
- Predecessor: George
- Successor: William IV

Duke of Bavaria-Munich
- Tenure: September 1467 – 18 March 1508
- Predecessor: Sigismund
- Successor: William IV
- Born: 15 December 1447; Munich, Duchy of Bavaria
- Died: 18 March 1508 (aged 60); Munich, Duchy of Bavaria
- Burial: Munich Frauenkirche
- Spouse: Kunigunde of Austria (m. 1487)
- Issue: Sidonie of Bavaria; Sibylle, Electress Palatine; Sabina, Duchess of Württemberg; William IV, Duke of Bavaria; Louis X, Duke of Bavaria; Ernest, Prince-Archbishop of Salzburg; Susanna, Countess Palatine of Neuburg
- House: Wittelsbach
- Father: Albert III, Duke of Bavaria-Munich
- Mother: Anna of Brunswick-Grubenhagen-Einbeck
- Religion: Roman Catholicism

Albert IV (15 December 1447 – 18 March 1508; German: Albrecht) was Duke of Bavaria-Munich from 1467, and duke of the reunited Bavaria from 1503.

== Biography ==
Albert was a son of Albert III, Duke of Bavaria and Anna of Brunswick-Grubenhagen-Einbeck. He was born in Munich. After the death of his older brother John IV, Duke of Bavaria he gave up his spiritual career and returned from Pavia to Munich. When his brothers Christoph and Wolfgang had resigned Albert became sole duke, but a new duchy Bavaria-Dachau was created from Bavaria-Munich for his brother Duke Sigismund in 1467. After Sigismund's death in 1501, it reverted to Bavaria-Munich.

The marriage of Kunigunde of Austria to Albert IV was a result of intrigues and deception, but must be counted as a defeat for Emperor Frederick III. Albert illegally took control of some imperial fiefs and then asked to marry Kunigunde (who lived in Innsbruck, far from her father), offering to give her the fiefs as a dowry. The Emperor agreed at first, but after Albert took over yet another fief, Regensburg, Emperor Frederick III withdrew his consent. On 2 January 1487, however, before the Emperor's change of heart could be communicated to his daughter, Kunigunde married Albert. A war was prevented only by intermediation by the Emperor's son, Maximilian I. For Albert's wedding, Grünwald Castle was extended in 1486/87 under the direction of Jörg von Weikertshausen. In 1491–1492, Albert fought the rebellious Löwlerbund. Albert finally decided to return territorial acquisitions in Swabia in 1492 to avoid a war with the Habsburg and the Swabian League. He then also had to release Regensburg, which had been reunited with Bavaria in 1486, and had to reluctantly renounce Further Austria when Archduke Sigismund of Austria tried to make it over to Albert.

After the death of the last duke of Bavaria-Landshut, George in 1503, Albert managed to reunite the whole of Bavaria in a dreadful war against George's heirs, the Palatinate line of his Wittelsbach family but had to transfer the most southern districts of Bavaria-Landshut to his brother-in-law Emperor Maximilian as compensation for his support: Kufstein, Kitzbühel and Rattenberg passed to Maximilian in 1506 and were united with Tyrol. For the Palatinate branch a new duchy of Palatinate-Neuburg was created.

To avoid any future division of Bavaria, Albert decreed the everlasting succession of the firstborn prince in 1506. Nevertheless, his oldest son and successor William IV, Duke of Bavaria had to share his power from 1516 onwards with his younger brother Louis X, Duke of Bavaria. After the death of Louis X in 1545, the edict became effective until the end of Bavarian monarchy in 1918.

Albert is buried in the Frauenkirche in Munich.

== Family and children ==
On 3 January 1487, Albert married Archduchess Kunigunde of Austria, daughter of Frederick III, Holy Roman Emperor and his wife Eleonor of Portugal. They had eight children:

1. Sidonie (1 May 1488 – 27 March 1505)
2. Sibylle (16 June 1489 – 18 April 1519), married in 1511 to Louis V, Elector Palatine
3. Sabina (24 April 1492 – 30 April 1564), married in 1511 to Duke Ulrich I of Württemberg
4. William IV, Duke of Bavaria (13 November 1493 – 7 March 1550)
5. Louis X, Duke of Bavaria (18 September 1495 – 22 April 1545)
6. Susanne (1499–1500)
7. Ernest of Bavaria (13 June 1500 – 1560), an eclassiastical official in Passau (1517–1540), Cologne, Archbishop in Salzburg (1540–1554) and Eichstädt, also administrator and owner of the County of Kladsko (1549–1560)
8. Susanne (2 April 1502 – 23 April 1543), married:
  1. in 1518 to Casimir, Margrave of Brandenburg-Bayreuth
  2. in 1529 to Otto Henry, Elector Palatine

== Sources ==
- Bietenholz, Peter G.; Deutscher, Thomas Brian, eds. (1995). Contemporaries of Erasmus: A Biographical Register of the Renaissance and Reformation. Vol. 1–3. University of Toronto Press.
- Thomas, Andrew L. (2010). A House Divided: Wittelsbach Confessional Court Cultures in the Holy Roman Empire, c. 1550-1650. Brill.

Albert IV of Bavaria House of Wittelsbach Born: 15 December 1447 Died: 18 March 1508
Regnal titles
Preceded by John IV and Sigismund	Duke of Bavaria-Munich; 1467–1508	Succeeded by William IV
Preceded by George the Rich	Duke of Bavaria-Landshut; 1503–1508	Succeeded by William IV
