= Blutenburg Castle =

Castle in Munich, Germany

Coordinates: 48°9′47″N 11°27′23″E

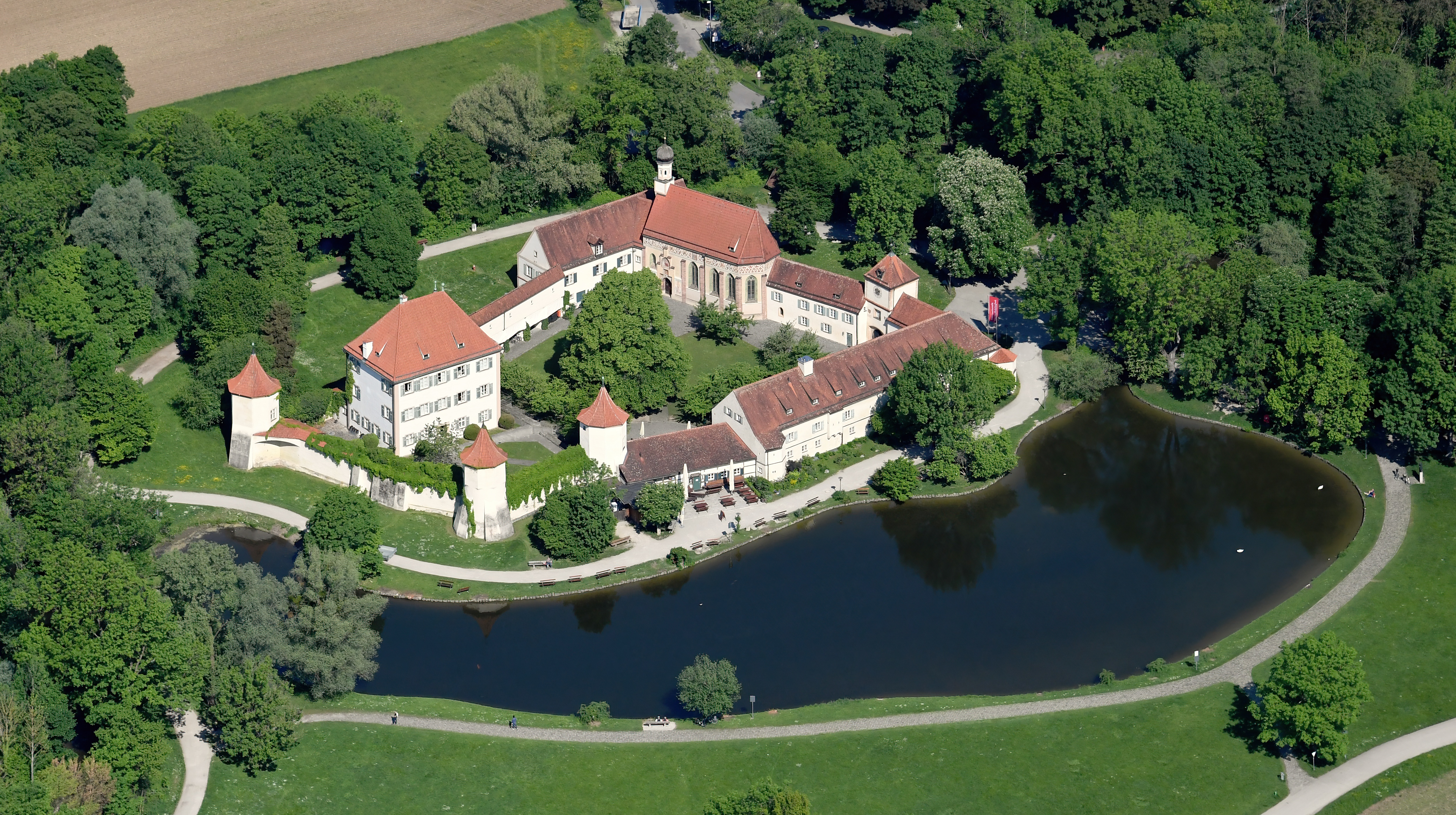
Aerial view of the Blutenburg Castle

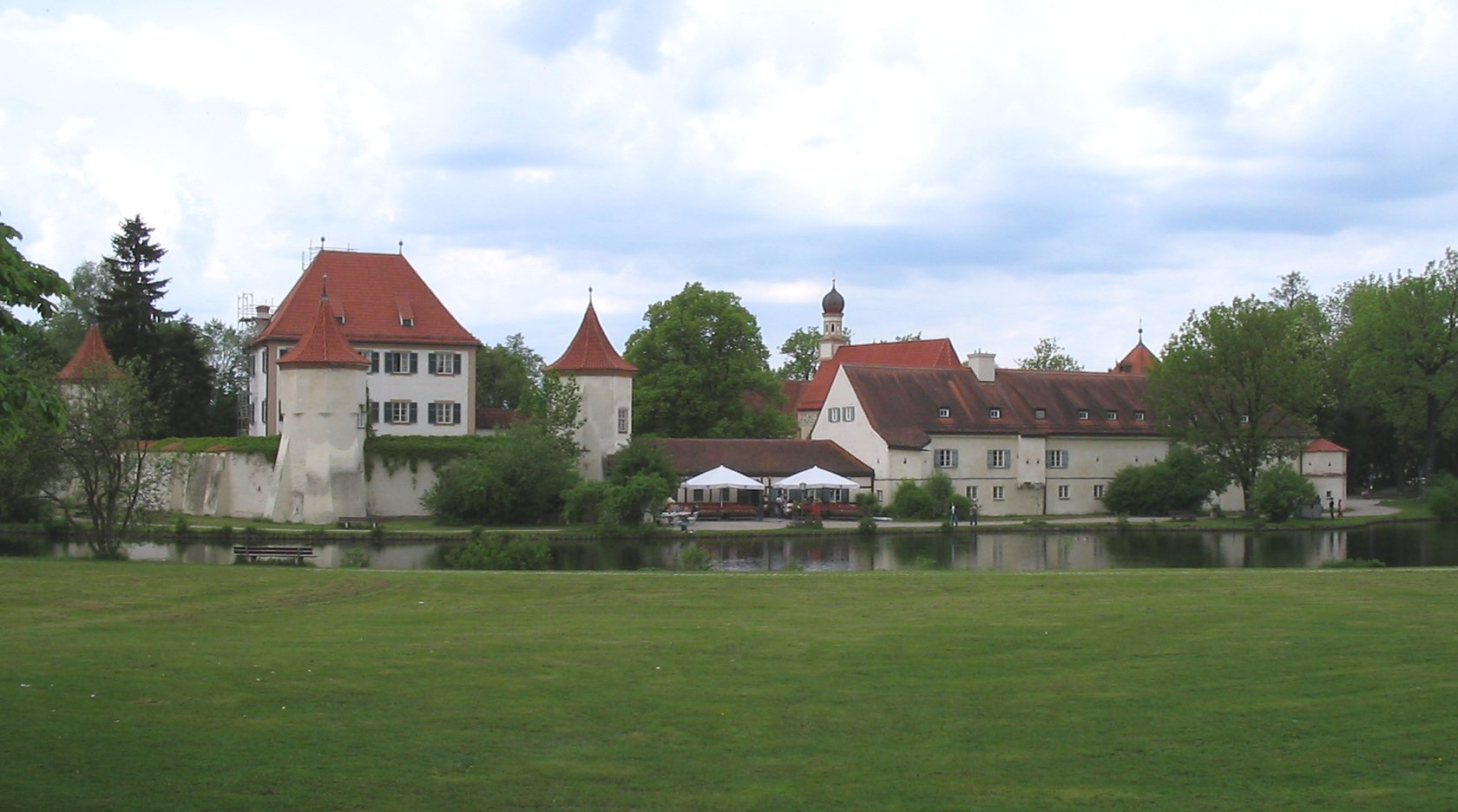
Blutenburg Castle

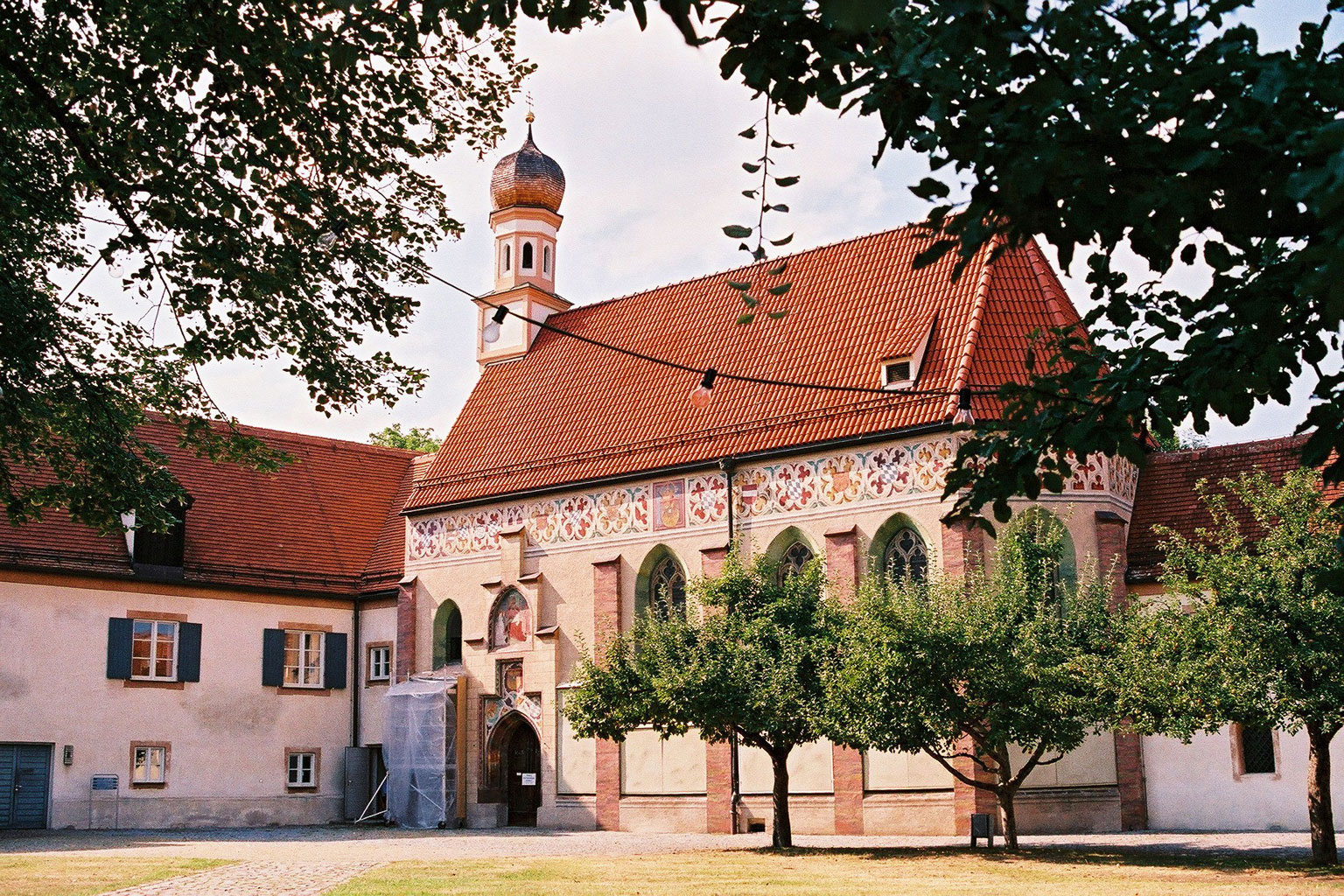
Palace Chapel

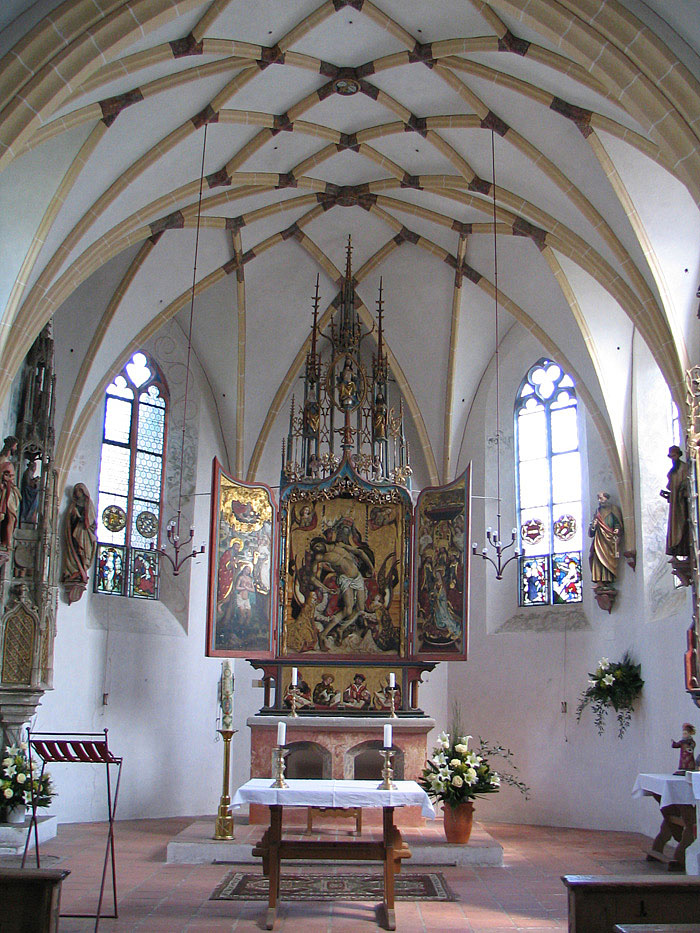
Palace Chapel interior

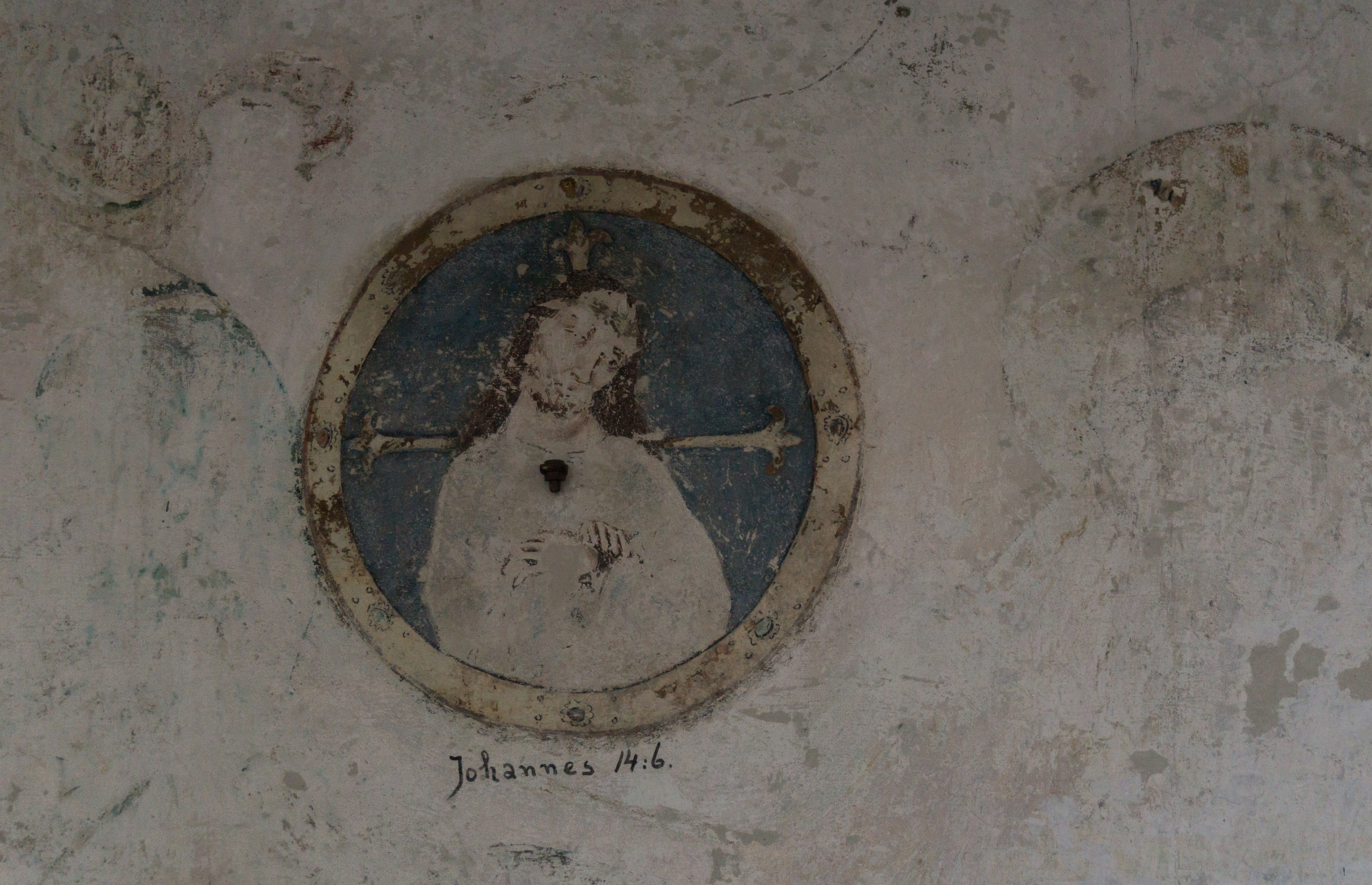
Frescoes inside the chapel of Blutenburg Castle

Blutenburg Castle is an old ducal country seat in the west of Munich, Germany, on the banks of river Würm.

== History ==
The castle was built between two arms of the River Würm for Duke Albert III, Duke of Bavaria in 1438–39 as a hunting-lodge, replacing an older castle burned down in war. The origin of this castle is a moated castle of the 13th century. The core of this castle was a residential tower, the remains of which were uncovered in 1981. The fortress was first mentioned in writing only in 1432.

Albert's son, Duke Sigismund of Bavaria, ordered extensions of the castle beginning in 1488 and later died here in 1501. The main building became derelict during the Thirty Years War, but was rebuilt in 1680–81. The castle is still surrounded by a ring wall with three towers and a gate tower. The defensive character of the castle was significantly reduced by reconstruction in 17th century because the plant was no longer defensible.

== The chapel ==
Sigismund of Bavaria also ordered the construction of the palace chapel, a splendid masterpiece of late Gothic style which still has preserved its stained-glass windows, along with the altars with three paintings created in 1491 by Jan Polack. The cycle of the statues of the apostles on the side walls was built around 1490/95. The executive master is controversial, which is why the statues are assigned to the "Master of the Blutenburg apostles." The apostles can not always be clearly identified as the attributes were partially reversed or lost. Appendant to these figures the "Man of Sorrows" and the distinguished "Mother of God" (Blutenburger Madonna) were erected in the choir on crest consoles that match those of the apostles.

== Present day ==
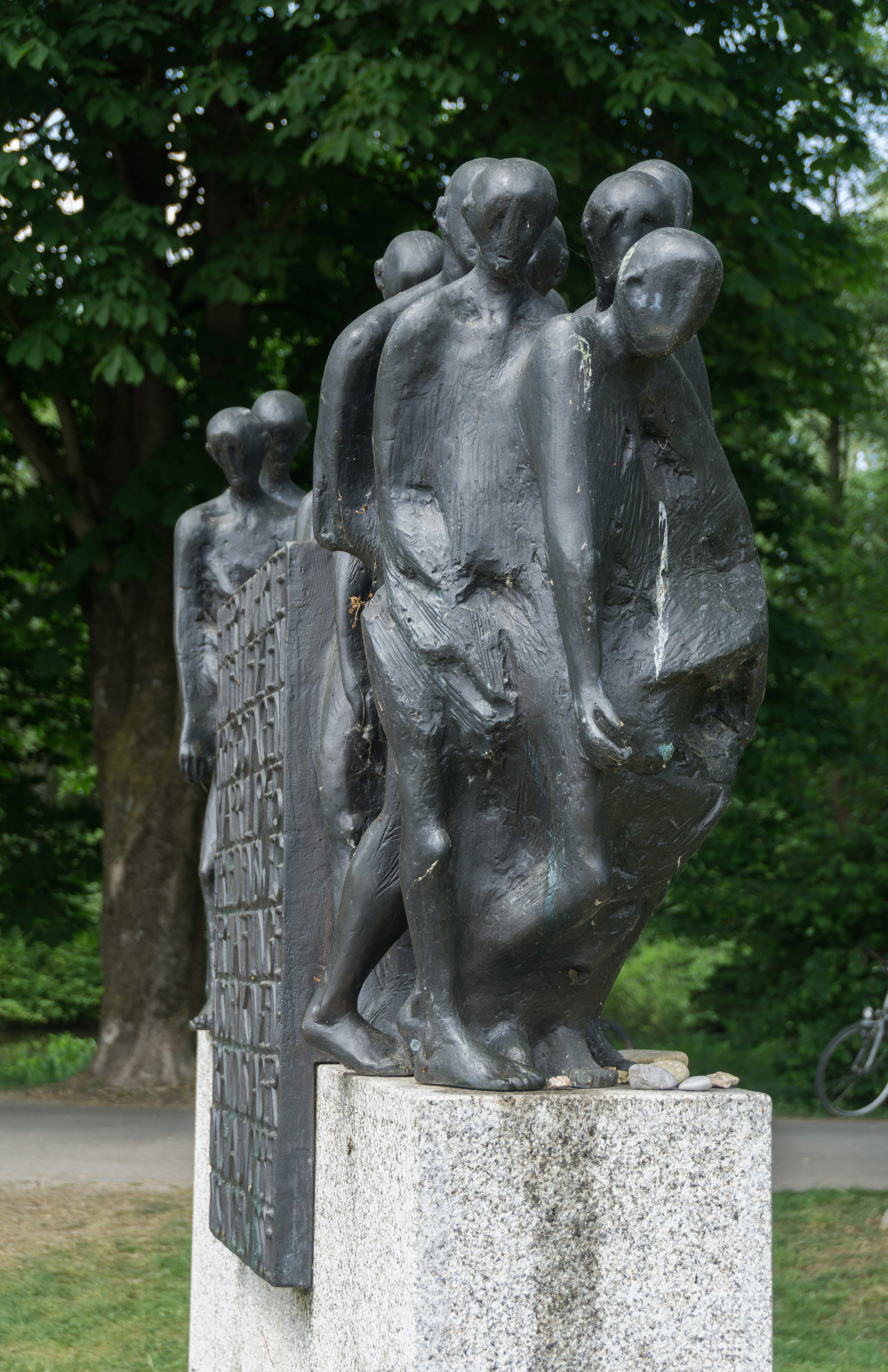
Jewish Memorial at Blutenburg Castle

Memorial to the death march starting at the Dachau concentration camp

Since 1983 the International Youth Library (Internationale Jugendbibliothek) has been housed in Blutenburg Castle. The Blutenburg concerts are well known.

Near the castle, a memorial by the sculptor Hubertus von Pilgrim was set up to remember the thousands of victims of the death march that the prisoners of the Dachau concentration camp were forced to go on. This memorial is one of 22 identical sculptures erected along the routes of the death marches.

In 2013 at the Blutenburg Castle there was erected the Sculpture of Agnes Bernauer with Albert III, Duke of Bavaria by Joseph Michael Neustifter. The memorial was funded by Ursula und Fritz Heimbüchler.
