= John IV of Bavaria =

- Duke of Bavaria-Munich
- Born: 4 October 1437; Munich, Duchy of Bavaria
- Died: 18 November 1463 (aged 26); Munich, Duchy of Bavaria
- Father: Albert III, Duke of Bavaria

John IV of Bavaria-Munich (German: Johann IV., Herzog von Bayern), (4 October 1437, in Munich – 18 November 1463, in Munich) was duke of Bavaria-Munich from 1460 until his death.

== Biography ==
John IV was a son of Albert III, Duke of Bavaria and ruled as duke of Bavaria-Munich from 1460 in a time of constant unrest of the nobility and strife with the cities. He was known as an avid hunter. He died of plague in 1463, and was succeeded by his brothers Sigismund (already co-regent since 1460) and Albert IV. John IV and his father are buried in Andechs Abbey.

John IV of Bavaria House of Wittelsbach Born: 4 October 1437 Died: 18 November 1463
Regnal titles
Preceded by Albert III	Duke of Bavaria-Munich; 1460–1463	Succeeded by Sigismund and Albert IV
