= Albert III of Bavaria =

Albert III
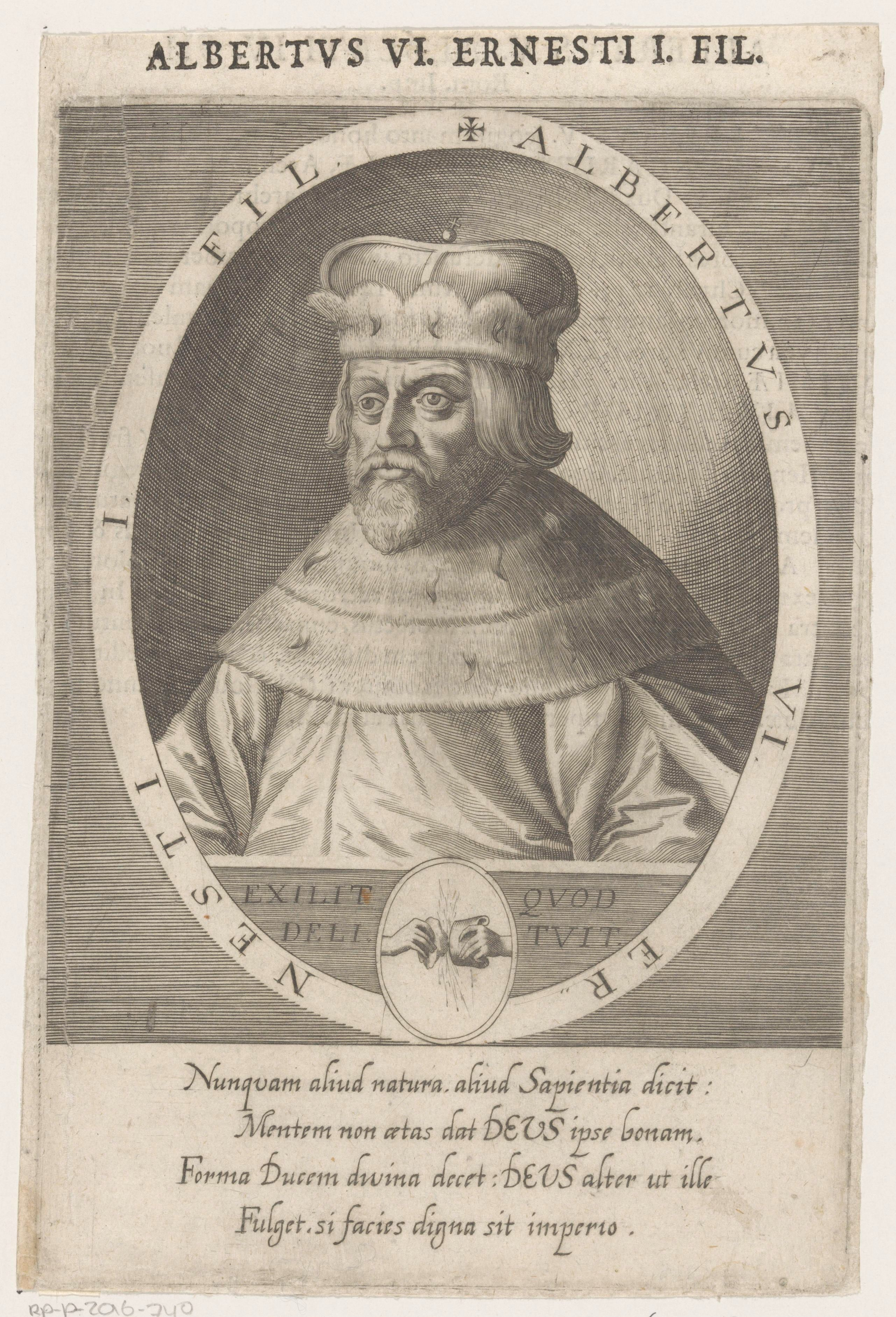
- Engraving of Albert III, 17th century

Duke of Bavaria-Munich
- Reign: 2 July 1438 - 29 February 1460
- Predecessor: Ernest
- Successor: John IV
- Born: 27 March 1401; Wolfratshausen
- Died: 29 February 1460 (aged 58); Munich
- Burial: Andechs
- Spouse: Agnes Bernauer Anna of Brunswick-Grubenhagen-Einbeck (m. 1437)
- Issue: John IV, Duke of Bavaria; Sigismund, Duke of Bavaria; Margaret of Bavaria, Marchioness of Mantua; Elisabeth of Bavaria, Electress of Saxony; Albert IV, Duke of Bavaria
- House: House of Wittelsbach
- Father: Ernest, Duke of Bavaria
- Mother: Elisabetta Visconti

Albert III the Pious of Bavaria-Munich (German: Albrecht III. der Fromme, Herzog von Bayern-München; 27 March 1401 – 29 February 1460), was Duke of Bavaria-Munich from 1438 to 1460. He was the son of Ernest, Duke of Bavaria and Elisabetta Visconti, daughter of Bernabò Visconti.

== Life ==
Albert was first engaged in 1429 to Elisabeth, the daughter of Eberhard III, Count of Württemberg, but she eloped and married Count John IV of Werdenberg, who had been a page at her father's court.

In 1432, while Albert was administrator on behalf of his father Ernest, Duke of Bavaria-Munich in the former duchy of Bavaria-Straubing, he secretly married Agnes Bernauer, a maid from Augsburg. His father was against this marriage. In 1435, when Agnes lived in Straubing, Duke Ernest ordered her to be murdered. She was accused of witchcraft, thrown into the Danube River and drowned while Albert was away hunting. After his first wife's death, Albert remained with Louis VII, Duke of Bavaria-Ingolstadt at Ingolstadt, but he reconciled with his father that November.

After reconciliation with his father, Albert married princess Anna of Brunswick-Grubenhagen-Einbeck as his second wife and had ten children with her.

In 1438, Albert succeeded his father as duke of Bavaria-Munich. Around 1438-39, he built Blutenburg Castle between two arms of the River Würm into a hunting lodge. The castle was later extended by his third son Sigismund. In 1440, Albert refused the offered Bohemian crown. In 1442, he expelled the Jews from all Upper Bavarian territories. It was not until 250 years later that Jewish settlement was allowed again. In 1444 and 1445, he initiated two campaigns against the Robber barons. After the extinction of the dukes of Bavaria-Ingolstadt, Albert released this duchy to his father's cousin Henry XVI of Bavaria-Landshut in 1447.

In 1455, Albert founded the Benedictine monastery in Andechs. He died in Munich in 1460 and was buried in Andechs.

== Family and children ==
On 22 January 1437 in Munich, Albert married Anna of Brunswick-Grubenhagen-Einbeck, daughter of Duke Eric I of Brunswick-Grubenhagen and Elisabeth of Brunswick-Göttingen. They had:

1. John IV, Duke of Bavaria (4 October 1437, Munich – 18 November 1463, Haidhausen).
2. Ernest (26 August 1438, Munich – 29 February 1460, Straubing).
3. Sigismund of Bavaria (1439, Straubing – 1 February 1501, Blutenburg Castle).
4. Albert (24 December 1440 – 1445, Straubing).
5. Margaret (1 January 1442, Munich – 14 October 1479, Mantua), married in Mantua 10 May 1463 to Federico I Gonzaga
6. Elisabeth (2 February 1443 – 5 March 1486, Leipzig), married in Leipzig 19 November 1460 to Elector Ernst of Saxony.
7. Albert IV, Duke of Bavaria (15 December 1447, Munich – 10 March 1508, Munich)
8. Christoph, Duke of Bavaria (6 January 1449 – 8 August 1493, Rhodes).
9. Wolfgang (1 November 1451 – 24 May 1514, Landsberg am Lech), a canon in Passau, Augsburg and Köln.
10. Barbara (9 June 1454, Munich – 24 June 1472, Munich), a nun in Munich.

He also had at least three illegitimate children.

== Sources ==
- James, Carolyn (2020). A Renaissance Marriage: The Political and Personal Alliance of Isabella d'Este & Francesco Gonzaga, 1490-1519. Oxford University Press.
- Thomas, Andrew L. (2010). A House Divided: Wittelsbach Confessional Court Cultures in the Holy Roman Empire, c. 1550-1650. Brill.

Albert III of Bavaria House of Wittelsbach Born: 27 March 1401 Died: 29 February 1460
Regnal titles
Preceded by Ernest	Duke of Bavaria-Munich; 1438–1460	Succeeded by John IV
