= Louis II of Brandenburg =

Prince-Elector of Brandenburg from 1356 to 1365

Louis VI
- Duke of Upper Bavaria
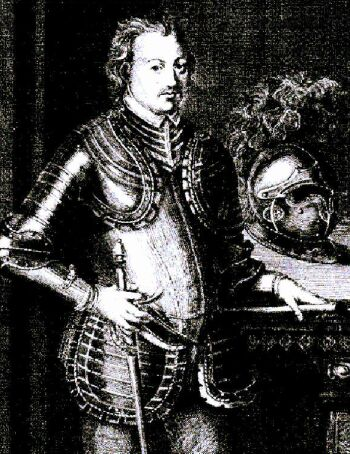
- Reign: 1347 - 1365
- Born: 7 May 1328; Rome, Italy
- Died: 17 May 1365 (aged 37); Berlin, Germany
- Spouse: Cunigunde of Poland; Ingeborg of Mecklenburg
- House: House of Wittelsbach
- Father: Louis IV, Holy Roman Emperor
- Mother: Margaret II, Countess of Hainaut

Louis the Roman (German: Ludwig VI der Römer) (7 May 1328 – 17 May 1365) was the eldest son of Holy Roman Emperor Louis IV by his second wife, Margaret II, Countess of Hainaut, and a member of the House of Wittelsbach. Louis was Duke of Upper Bavaria as Louis VI (1347–1365) and Margrave of Brandenburg (1351–1365) as Louis II. As of 1356, he also served as Prince-Elector of Brandenburg.

== Biography ==
Louis was born in Rome when his parents travelled there for his father's coronation as Holy Roman Emperor, hence his nickname "the Roman". When his father died in 1347, Louis succeeded him as Duke of Bavaria (as Louis VI) and Count of Holland and Hainaut together with his five brothers. Louis released Holland and Hainaut for his brothers William I and Albert I in 1349, since he expected to acquire the Polish crown by his in 1345 marriage with Cunigunde of Poland, a daughter of Casimir III and Aldona Ona of Lithuania. Later claims against William and Albert were not successful. Hence Louis supported his mother during her war with William.

In December 1351 Louis VI received Brandenburg from his older half-brother Louis V of Bavaria in exchange for the sole rule of Upper Bavaria. Less experienced than Louis V, he was also challenged by the "False Waldemar", an impostor who claimed Brandenburg and got support from several cities and Holy Roman Emperor Charles IV until the Wittelsbachs came to terms with Charles. Louis also had to abandon claims on fiefdoms in Mecklenburg and Pomerania. With the Golden Bull of 1356, Louis secured the electoral dignity. In 1358 Louis was absolved from the papal excommunication.

After Cunigunde's death in 1357, Louis married Ingeborg of Mecklenburg-Schwerin. She was a daughter of Albert II, Duke of Mecklenburg, and Euphemia of Sweden. Louis had no children with her, either, thus his younger brother Otto V succeeded him in Brandenburg. The childless dukes Louis and Otto had already promised Charles IV the succession in Brandenburg in 1364 as revenge for a conflict with their brother Stephen II over the Bavarian succession after the death of their nephew Meinhard, the son of Louis V. Louis the Roman died in Berlin in 1365.

Louis II of Brandenburg House of Wittelsbach Born: 1328 Died: 1365
Preceded by Louis the Brandenburger	Margraviate of Brandenburg; 1351–1365 with Otto the Lazy	Succeeded by Otto the Lazy
Preceded by new title	Elector of Brandenburg; 1356–1365 with Otto the Lazy	Succeeded by Otto the Lazy
Preceded by Louis IV	Duke of Bavaria; 1347–1365	Succeeded by Stephen II
