= History of Bavaria =

The history of Bavaria stretches from its earliest settlement and its formation as a stem duchy in the 6th century through its inclusion in the Holy Roman Empire to its status as an independent kingdom and finally as a large Bundesland (state) of the Federal Republic of Germany. In the Iron Age, it was settled by Celtic-influenced peoples such as the Raetians and Vindelici, by the 1st century BC, the part south of the Danube was conquered and incorporated into the Roman Empire, and roughly corresponded to the Roman province of Raetia.

== Early settlements and Roman Raetia ==
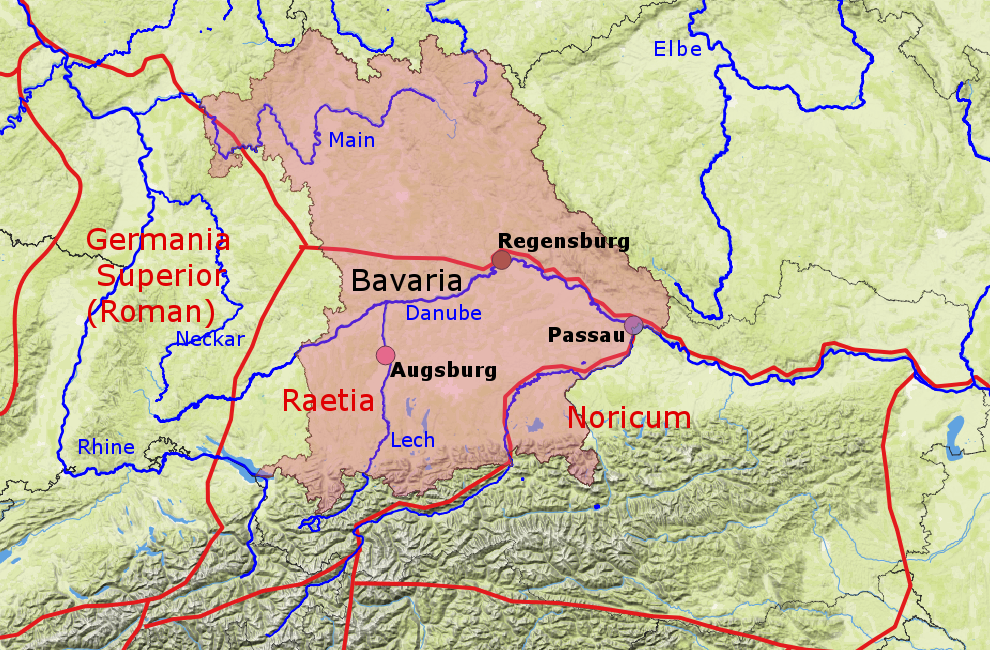
Modern Bavaria compared to Roman provinces

There have been numerous palaeolithic discoveries in Bavaria. The earliest inhabitants known from surviving written sources were culturally Celts, their civilization corresponding to the widespread La Tène culture. The Raeti however, who lived in the Alpine regions, spoke a language related to Etruscan, and the Romans believed that they had migrated from Italy.

The Roman Empire under Augustus made the Danube, which runs through Bavaria, its northern boundary, meaning that a large part of Bavaria became Roman. What is now southern Bavaria was roughly equivalent to the Roman province of Raetia. The northern part of Raetia was inhabited by the Vindelici, who Strabo described as living on high plateaus. He also notes that the Boii originally lived in plains overlooked by the Raeti and Vindelici, and the lands of these three peoples once stretched as far west as Lake Constance. The Boii however, were no longer mentioned in later Roman accounts of Raetia. The main Roman city in Raetia was Augusta Vindelicorum, modern Augsburg. Modern-day Regensburg (Radasbona, or Castra Regina) and Passau (Boiodurum named after the Boii) were fortified frontier positions on the Danube. Until the Marcomannic Wars, north of the Danubian border in Raetia lived the Germanic Hermunduri who arrived in the region during Roman times. After the Roman victories in those Marcomannic wars the Armalausi and the Suebian Juthungi lived immediately north of the Danube until the fifth century. Further north near the Main river, where the Chatti had once lived, the Allemanni first appeared in the third century. They eventually moved further west, and southwards, establishing themselves to the west of Bavaria. In the north of Bavaria, in the Main region, they were replaced by the Burgundians already in the third century, who also subsequently moved westwards.

== Migrations and early medieval period ==
During the fifth century, the Romanized population of Raetia and neighbouring Noricum (roughly Austria) were increasingly disconnected from the central government in Italy, and came increasingly under the influence of non-Roman tribes, some of whom appear in records for the first time in this period. To the east of Noricum in Roman Pannonia, large numbers of Huns, Alans and Goths settled after 378. In 384 Valentinian II's military leader Bauto allowed Alans and Huns to enter Raetia from the east and fight the Juthungi who were now in Raetia. They were told to withdraw when their ransacking of the Alemanni came too close to the Rhine and Gaul. In about 430 the Roman general Aëtius defeated rebels and Juthungi in the Roman provinces of Raetia and Noricum, but this was the last mention of the Juthungi. There are indications that the Thuringi were established in northern Bavaria in the fifth century, although in the sixth century their kingdom was restricted to an area further north, and the Franks began to take control of the region.

In surviving records, the Bavarian name was first perhaps mentioned in a Frankish list of peoples, which existed by about 520 AD. The 6th century writer Jordanes, described them as having already ruling territory east of the Allemani in about 470. A remark by Venantius Fortunatus follows in his description of his travels from Ravenna to Tours (565–571), in which he had crossed the lands of the Bavarians, referring to the dangers of travel in the region: "If the road is clear and if the Bavarian does not stop you [...] then travel across the Alps". Although new, the name of the Bavarians (Latin Baiovarii) has its roots in the region. The Celtic Boii had lived on both sides of the Danube before the Roman conquest, stretching into part of Bavaria. During Roman times their name was already the basis of the regional name Bohemia, which lies to the east of modern Bavaria in the Czech Republic. The second century geographer Claudius Ptolemy mentioned a "large people" known as the "'Baimoi", living near the Danube north of modern Budapest. Within Roman Pannonia there was also a civitas of the Boii. It lay on the Danube near present day Vienna, in the north west of the Roman province of Pannonia, bordering on Noricum. The ending "-varii" is Germanic and was used in order to describe peoples living in specific geographical areas. Similar Germanic ethnic names were created in other regions, for example the Angrivarii and Ampsivarii in northern Germany, and the Cantware in Kent.

Archaeological evidence dating from the 5th and 6th centuries points to social and cultural influences from several regions and peoples in Bavaria, such as Alamanni, Lombards, Thuringians, Goths, Bohemian Slavs and the local Romanised population. Recent research by Wolfram and Pohl (1990) has moved away from searching for specific geographical origins of the Bavarians. It is now thought that the tribal ethnicity was established by the process of ethnogenesis, whereby an ethnic identity is formed because political and social pressures make a coherent identity necessary.

== The stem duchy of Bavaria ==
=== Bavaria and the Agilolfings under Frankish overlordship ===
The Bavarians soon came under the dominion of the Franks, probably without a serious struggle. The Franks regarded this border area as a buffer zone against peoples to the east, such as the Avars and the Slavs, and as a source of manpower for the army. Sometime around 550 AD they put it under the administration of a duke – possibly Frankish or possibly chosen from amongst the local leading families – who was supposed to act as a regional governor for the Frankish king. The first duke known was Garibald I, a member of the powerful Agilolfing family. This was the beginning of a series of Agilolfing dukes that was to last until 788 AD.

For a century and a half, a succession of dukes resisted the inroads of the Slavs on their eastern frontier and by the time of Duke Theodo I, who died in 717, had achieved complete independence from the feeble Frankish kings. When Charles Martel became the virtual ruler of the Frankish realm he brought the Bavarians into strict dependence and deposed two dukes successively for contumacy. His son and successor Pepin the Short likewise maintained Frankish authority. Several marriages took place between the family to which he belonged and the Agilolfings, who were united in a similar manner with the kings of the Lombards. The ease with which the Franks suppressed various risings gives colour to the supposition that family quarrels rather than the revolt of an oppressed people motivated the rebellions.

Bavarian law was committed to writing between the years 739 AD and 748 AD. Supplementary clauses, added afterward, bear evidence of Frankish influence. Thus, while the duchy belongs to the Agilolfing family, the duke must be chosen by the people and his election confirmed by the Frankish king, to whom he owes fealty. The duke has a fivefold weregild, summons the nobles and clergy for purposes of deliberation, calls out the host, administers justice, and regulates finance. Five noble families exist, possibly representing former divisions of the people. Subordinate to the nobles we find the freeborn and then the freedmen. The law divided the country into gaits or counties, under their counts, assisted by judges responsible for declaring the law.

=== Christianity ===
Christianity had lingered in Bavaria from Roman times, but a new era set in when Bishop Rupert of Worms came to the county at the invitation of Duke Theodo I in 696. He founded several monasteries, as did Bishop Emmeran of Poitiers, with the result that before long, most of the people professed Christianity and relations commenced between Bavaria and Rome. The 8th century witnessed indeed a heathen reaction, but the arrival of Saint Boniface in Bavaria during c. 734 AD checked apostasy. Boniface organised the Bavarian church and founded or restored bishoprics at Salzburg, Freising, Regensburg and Passau.

Tassilo III, who became duke of the Bavarians in 749, recognized the supremacy of the Frankish king, Pepin the Short in 757 AD, but soon afterward refused to furnish a contribution to the war in Aquitaine. Moreover, during the early years of the reign of Charlemagne, Tassilo gave decisions in ecclesiastical and civil causes in his own name, refused to appear in the assemblies of the Franks, and in general acted as an independent ruler. His control of the Alpine passes, and his position as an ally of the Avars and as a son-in-law of the Lombard king Desiderius, became so troublesome to the Frankish kingdom that Charlemagne determined to crush him.

The details of this contest remain obscure. Tassilo appears to have done homage in 781 AD and again in 787 AD, probably owing to the presence of Frankish armies. But further trouble soon arose, and in 788 AD, the Franks summoned the duke to Ingelheim and sentenced him to death on a charge of treachery. The King, however, pardoned Tassilo who entered a monastery and formally renounced his duchy at Frankfurt in 794.

Gerold, a brother-in-law of Charlemagne, ruled Bavaria till his death in a battle with the Avars in 799, when Frankish counts took over the administration and assimilated the land with the rest of the Carolingian empire. Measures taken by Charlemagne for the intellectual progress and material welfare of his realm improved conditions. The Bavarians offered no resistance to the change which thus abolished their duchy. Their incorporation with the Frankish dominions, due mainly to the unifying influence of the church, appeared already so complete that Charlemagne did not find it necessary to issue more than two capitularies dealing especially with Bavarian affairs.

=== The Duchy during the Carolingian period ===
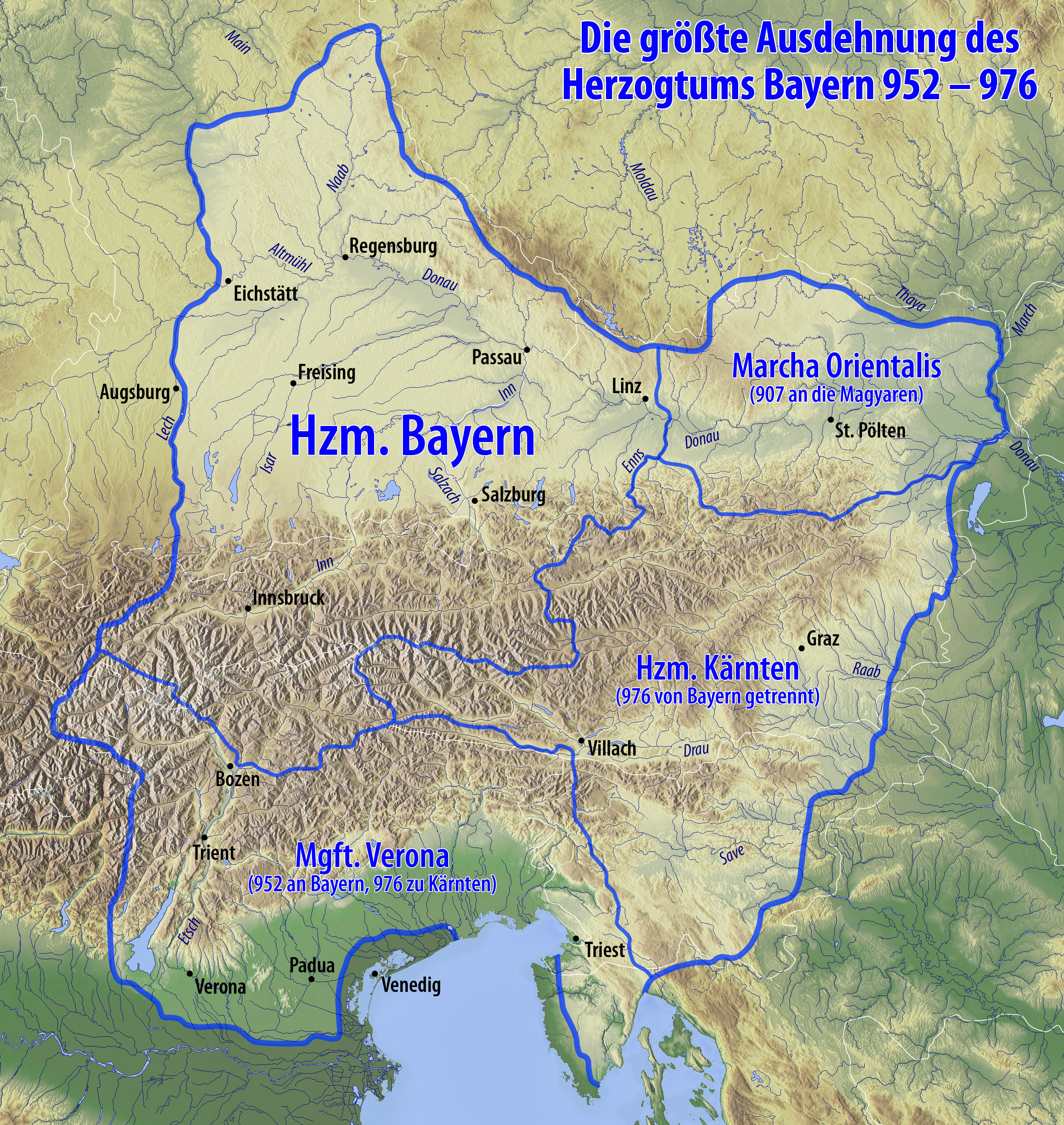
Stem duchy of Bavaria in the 10th century

The history of Bavaria for the ensuing century intertwines with that of the Carolingian empire. Bavaria, given during the partition of 817 AD to the king of the East Franks, Louis the German, formed a part of the larger territories confirmed to him in 843 AD by the Treaty of Verdun. Louis made Regensburg the center of his government and actively developed Bavaria, providing for its security by numerous campaigns against the Slavs. When he divided his possessions in 865 AD, it passed to his eldest son, Carloman, who had already managed its administration, and after his death in 880 AD, it became a part of the extensive territories of the emperor, Charles the Fat. This ruler left its defense to Arnulf, an illegitimate son of Carloman. Mainly due to the support of the Bavarians, Arnulf could take the field against Charles in 887 AD and secure his own election as a German king in the following year. In 899 AD, Bavaria passed to Louis the Child, during whose reign continuous Hungarian ravages occurred. Resistance to these inroads became gradually feebler, and tradition has it that on 5 July 907 almost the whole of the Bavarian tribe perished in the Battle of Pressburg against them.

During the reign of Louis the Child, Luitpold, Count of Scheyern, who possessed large Bavarian domains, ruled the Mark of Carinthia, created on the southeastern frontier for the defense of Bavaria. He died in the great battle of 907 AD, but his son Arnulf, surnamed the Bad, rallied the remnants of the tribe, in alliance with the Hungarians, became duke of the Bavarians in 911 AD, uniting Bavaria and Carinthia under his rule. The German king, Conrad I, attacked Arnulf when the latter refused to acknowledge his royal supremacy but failed in the end.

=== Duchy during the Ottonian and Salian periods ===
Bavaria within the Holy Roman Empire in AD 1000, forming the southeasternmost part of the kingdom of Germany, bordered by the March of Verona to the south, and the March of Carinthia to the east

In 920 AD, Conrad's successor was the German king, Henry the Fowler of the Ottonian dynasty. Henry recognized Arnulf as duke, confirming his right to appoint bishops, coin money, and issue laws.

A similar conflict took place between Arnulf's son and successor Eberhard and Henry's son Otto I the Great. Eberhard proved less successful than his father, and in 938 AD, fled from Bavaria, which Otto granted (with reduced privileges) to the late duke's uncle, Bertold. Otto also appointed a count palatine in the person of Eberhard's brother, Arnulf to watch the royal interests.

When Bertold died in 947 AD, Otto conferred the duchy upon his own brother Henry, who had married Judith, a daughter of Duke Arnulf. The Bavarians disliked Henry, who spent his short reign mainly in disputes with his people.

The ravages of the Hungarians ceased after their defeat on the Lechfeld (955 AD) and the area of the duchy was augmented for a time by the addition of certain adjacent districts in Italy.

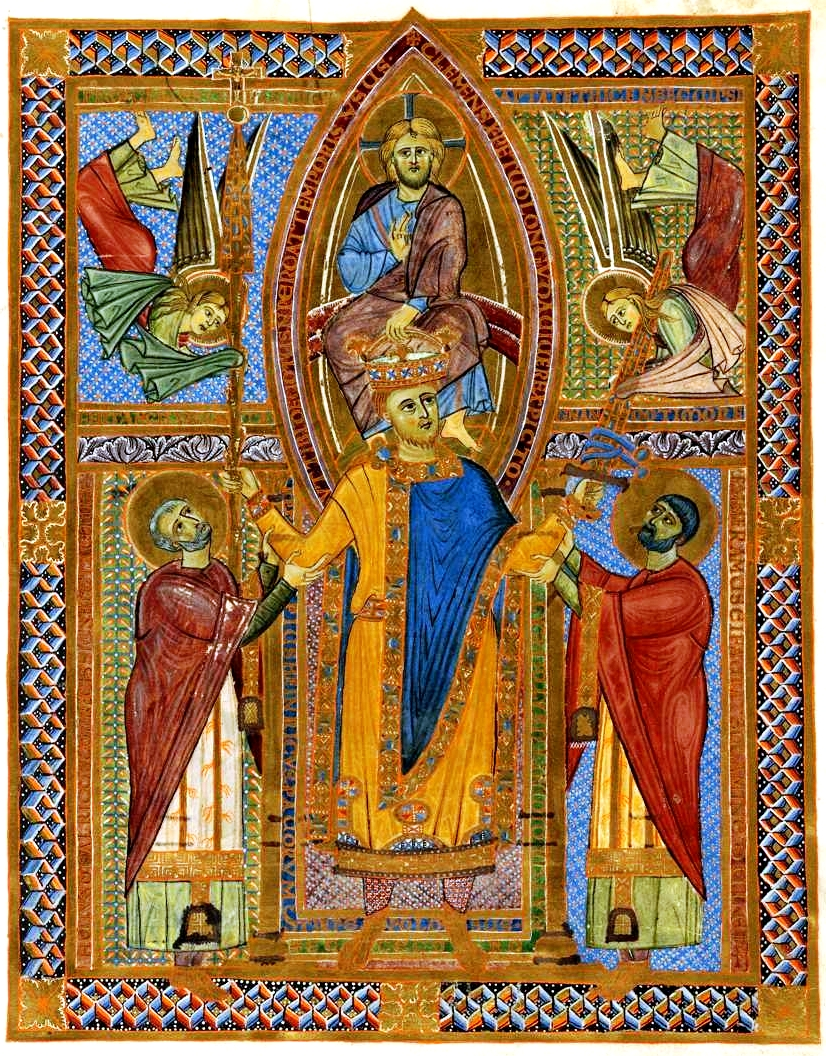
Emperor Henry II

In 955 AD, Henry's young son Henry, surnamed the Quarrelsome, succeeded him, but in 974 AD he became involved in a conspiracy against King Otto II. The rising occurred because the king had granted the Duchy of Swabia to Henry's enemy, Otto, a grandson of Emperor Otto the Great, and had given the new Bavarian Eastern March, subsequently known as Austria, to Leopold of Babenberg. The revolt soon failed but Henry, who on his escape from prison renewed his plots, formally lost his Duchy of Bavaria in 976 AD to Otto, Duke of Swabia. At the same time, Carinthia was made a separate duchy, the office of Count Palatine was reestablished, and the Bavarian church became dependent on the king instead of on the duke.

Bavaria at this stage included the Inn basin (including Salzburg and the Salzach basin) and the Danube from Donauwörth (Lech confluence) to Linz; the March of Verona (South Tyrol) briefly fell to Bavaria (952 AD) before passing to Carinthia (976 AD). The most important Bavarian cities at the time were Freising, Passau, Salzburg and Regensburg.

Restored in 985 AD, Henry proved himself a capable ruler, establishing internal order, issuing important laws, and taking measures to reform the monasteries. In 1002 AD, his son and successor Henry II gave Bavaria to his brother-in-law Henry of Luxembourg, after whose death in 1026 AD it passed successively to Henry, afterward Emperor Henry III, and then to another member of the family of Luxembourg, ruling as Duke Henry VII. In 1061 AD, Empress Agnes, mother and regent of the German king Henry IV, entrusted the duchy to Otto of Nordheim.

=== Under the Welfs ===
In 1070 AD, King Henry IV deposed duke Otto, granting the duchy to Count Welf, a member of an influential Bavarian family with roots in northern Italy.

In consequence of his support of Pope Gregory VII in his quarrel with Henry, Welf lost but subsequently regained Bavaria; two of his sons followed him in succession: Welf II from 1101 AD and Henry IX from 1120 AD. Both exercised considerable influence among the German princes.

Henry IX's son Henry X, called the Proud, succeeded in 1126 AD and also obtained the Duchy of Saxony in 1137 AD. Alarmed at his power, King Conrad III refused to allow two duchies to remain in the same hands and declared Henry deposed. He bestowed Bavaria upon Leopold IV, Margrave of Austria. When Leopold died in 1141, the king retained the duchy himself; but it continued to be the scene of considerable disorder, and in 1143 AD he entrusted it to Henry, surnamed Jasomirgott, Margrave of Austria.

The struggle for its possession continued until 1156 AD, when Emperor Frederick I, in his desire to restore peace to Germany, persuaded Henry to give up Bavaria to Henry the Lion, duke of Saxony and son of Henry the Proud. In return, Austria was elevated from a margraviate to an independent duchy in the Privilegium Minus. It was Henry the Lion who founded Munich.

=== Geographic fluctuations ===
During the years following the dissolution of the Carolingian empire the borders of Bavaria changed continuously and for a lengthy period after 955 AD, it finally started expanding. To the west, the Lech still divided Bavaria from Swabia but on three other sides Bavaria took advantage of opportunities for expansion and the duchy occupied a considerable area north of the Danube. During the later years of the rule of the Welfs, however, a contrary tendency operated, and the extent of Bavaria shrank.

In 1027 AD, Conrad II split off the Bishopric of Trent from the former Lombard Kingdom of Italy. He attached it to the stem duchy of Bavaria, which was then under the rule of his son Henry III. From the 12th century onwards, the counts residing in Castle Tyrol near Merano extended their territory over much of the region and came to surpass the power of the bishops of Brixen, of whom they were nominally vassals. After the deposition of Henry X the Proud as Bavarian duke in 1138 AD, the Counts of Tyrol strengthened their independence from Bavaria under his son, Henry the Lion. When the House of Welf was again given to the Bavarian duchy by Frederick Barbarossa at the 1154 AD Reichstag of Goslar, the county of Tyrol was no longer counted as part of Bavaria.

Duke Henry the Lion focused on his northern duchy of Saxony rather than on his southern duchy of Bavaria, and when the dispute over the Bavarian succession ended in 1156 AD, the district between the Enns and the Inn became part of Austria.

The increasing importance of former Bavarian territories like the March of Styria (erected into a duchy in 1180 AD) and of the county of Tyrol had diminished both the actual and the relative strength of Bavaria, which now on almost all sides lacked opportunities for expansion. The neighboring Duchy of Carinthia, the large territories of the Archbishopric of Salzburg, as well as a general tendency to claim more independence on the part of the nobles: all these causes limited Bavarian expansion.

== Under the Wittelsbach dynasty ==
A new era began when, in consequence of Henry the Lion being placed under an imperial ban in 1180 AD, Emperor Frederick I awarded the duchy to Otto, a member of the old Bavarian family of Wittelsbach and a descendant of the counts of Scheyern. The Wittelsbach dynasty ruled Bavaria without interruption until 1918 AD. The Electorate of the Palatinate was also acquired by the Wittelsbachs in 1214 AD.

When Otto of Wittelsbach gained Bavaria at Altenburg in September 1180, the duchy's borders comprised the Böhmerwald, the Inn, the Alps and the Lech; and the duke exercised practical power only over his extensive private domains around Wittelsbach, Kelheim and Straubing.

Otto only enjoyed three years of rule over Bavaria. His son Louis I succeeded him in 1183 AD, playing a leading part in German affairs during the early years of the reign of the emperor Frederick II until Louis was assassinated at Kelheim in September 1231. His son Otto II, called the Illustrious, remained loyal to the Hohenstaufen emperors despite the Church placing Bavaria under an interdict and himself under a papal ban. Like his father, Otto II increased the area of his lands by purchases and considerably strengthened his hold upon the duchy. He died in November 1253.

=== Partitions ===
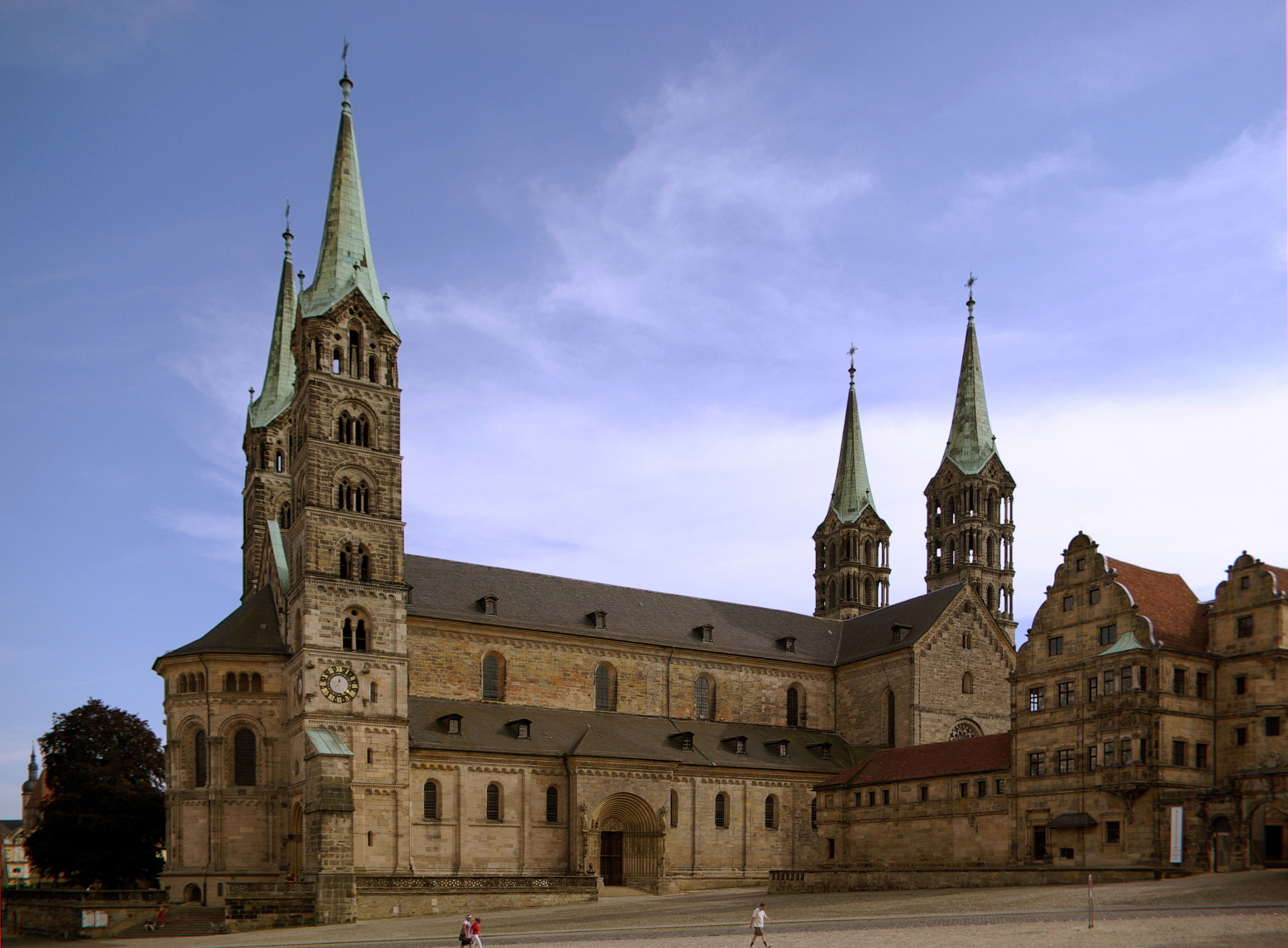
Bamberg Cathedral, completed in the 13th century

The efforts of the dukes to increase their power and to give unity to the duchy had met with a fair measure of success; but they were soon vitiated by partitions among different members of the family, which for 250 years made the history of Bavaria little more than a repetitive chronicle of territorial divisions bringing war and weakness in their wake.

The first of these divisions occurred in 1255. Louis II and Henry XIII, the sons of Duke Otto II, who for two years after their father's death had ruled Bavaria jointly, split their inheritance: Louis II obtained the western part of the duchy, afterward called Upper Bavaria, as well as the Electorate of the Palatinate, while Henry secured eastern or Lower Bavaria.

=== Lower Bavaria ===
Henry XIII of Lower Bavaria spent most of his time in quarrels with his brother, with Ottakar II of Bohemia and with various ecclesiastics. When he died in February 1290, the land fell to his three sons, Otto III, Louis III, and Stephen I. The families of these three princes governed Lower Bavaria until 1333, when Henry XV (son of Otto III) died, followed in 1334 by his cousin Otto IV; and as both died without sons the whole of Lower Bavaria then passed to Henry XIV. Dying in 1339, Henry left an only son, John I, who died childless in the following year, when the Wittelsbach emperor Louis IV, by securing Lower Bavaria for himself, united the whole of the duchy under his sway.

=== Upper Bavaria ===
In the course of a long reign, Louis II, called "the Stern", became the most powerful prince in southern Germany. He served as the guardian of his nephew Conradin of Hohenstaufen, and after Conradin's execution in Italy in 1268, Louis and his brother Henry inherited the domains of the Hohenstaufens in Swabia and elsewhere. He supported Count Rudolph I of Habsburg, in his efforts to secure the German throne in 1273, married the new king's daughter Mechtild, and aided him in campaigns in Bohemia.

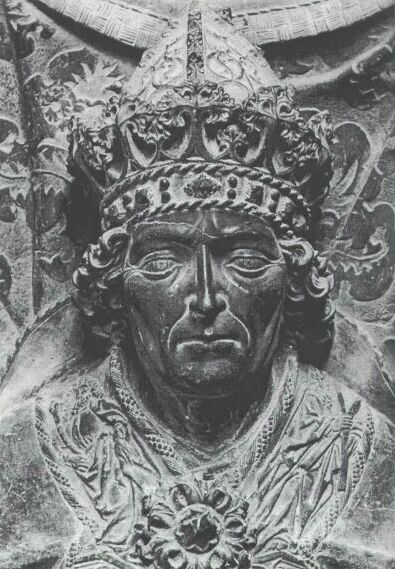
Emperor Louis IV

For some years after Louis' death in 1294, his sons Rudolph I and Louis, afterward the emperor Louis IV, ruled their duchy in common; but as their relations were never harmonious, a division of Upper Bavaria occurred in 1310, by which Rudolph received the land east of the Isar together with the town of Munich, and Louis the district between the Isar and the Lech. It was not long, however, before this arrangement led to war between the brothers, with the result that in 1317, three years after he had become German king, Louis compelled Rudolph to abdicate, and for twelve years ruled alone over the whole of Upper Bavaria. But in 1329 a series of events induced him to conclude the Treaty of Pavia with Rudolph's sons, Rudolph and Rupert, to whom he transferred the Electorate of the Palatinate (which the Wittelsbach family had owned since 1214) and also a portion of Bavaria north of the Danube, afterward called the Upper Palatinate (Oberpfalz).

At the same time, the two lines of the Wittelsbach family decided to exercise the electoral vote alternately, and that in the event of the extinction of either branch of the family, the surviving branch should inherit its possessions.

The consolidation of Bavaria under Louis IV lasted for seven years, during which the emperor was able to improve the condition of the country. When he died in 1347 he left six sons to share his possessions, who agreed upon a division of Bavaria in 1349. Its history, however, was complicated by its connections with Brandenburg, Holland, Hainaut and Tirol, all of which the emperor had also left to his sons. All the six brothers exercised some authority in Bavaria; but three alone left issue, and of these, the eldest, Louis V, Duke of Bavaria – also margrave of Brandenburg and count of Tyrol – died in 1361 and was followed to the grave two years later by his only son, the childless Meinhard. Tyrol then passed to the Habsburgs. Brandenburg was lost in 1373.

The two remaining brothers, Stephen II and Albert I, ruled over Bavaria-Landshut and Bavaria-Straubing respectively and when Stephen died in 1375 his three sons governed his portion of Bavaria jointly. In 1392, on the extinction of all the lines except those of Stephen and Albert, an important partition took place, which subdivided the greater part of the duchy amongst Stephen's three sons, Stephen III, Frederick and John II, who founded respectively the lines of Ingolstadt, Landshut and Munich.

The main result of the threefold division of 1392 proved to be a succession of civil wars which led to the temporary eclipse of Bavaria as a force in German politics. Neighboring states encroached upon its borders, and the nobles ignored the authority of the dukes, who, deprived of the electoral vote, were mainly occupied for fifty years with internal strife.

This condition of affairs, however, had some benefits. The government of the country and the control of the finances passed mainly into the hands of an assembly called the Landtag or Landschaft, organized in 1392. The towns, assuming certain independence, became strong and wealthy as trade increased, and the citizens of Munich and Regensburg often proved formidable antagonists to the dukes. Thus, a period of disorder saw the growth of representative institutions and the establishment of a strong civic spirit.

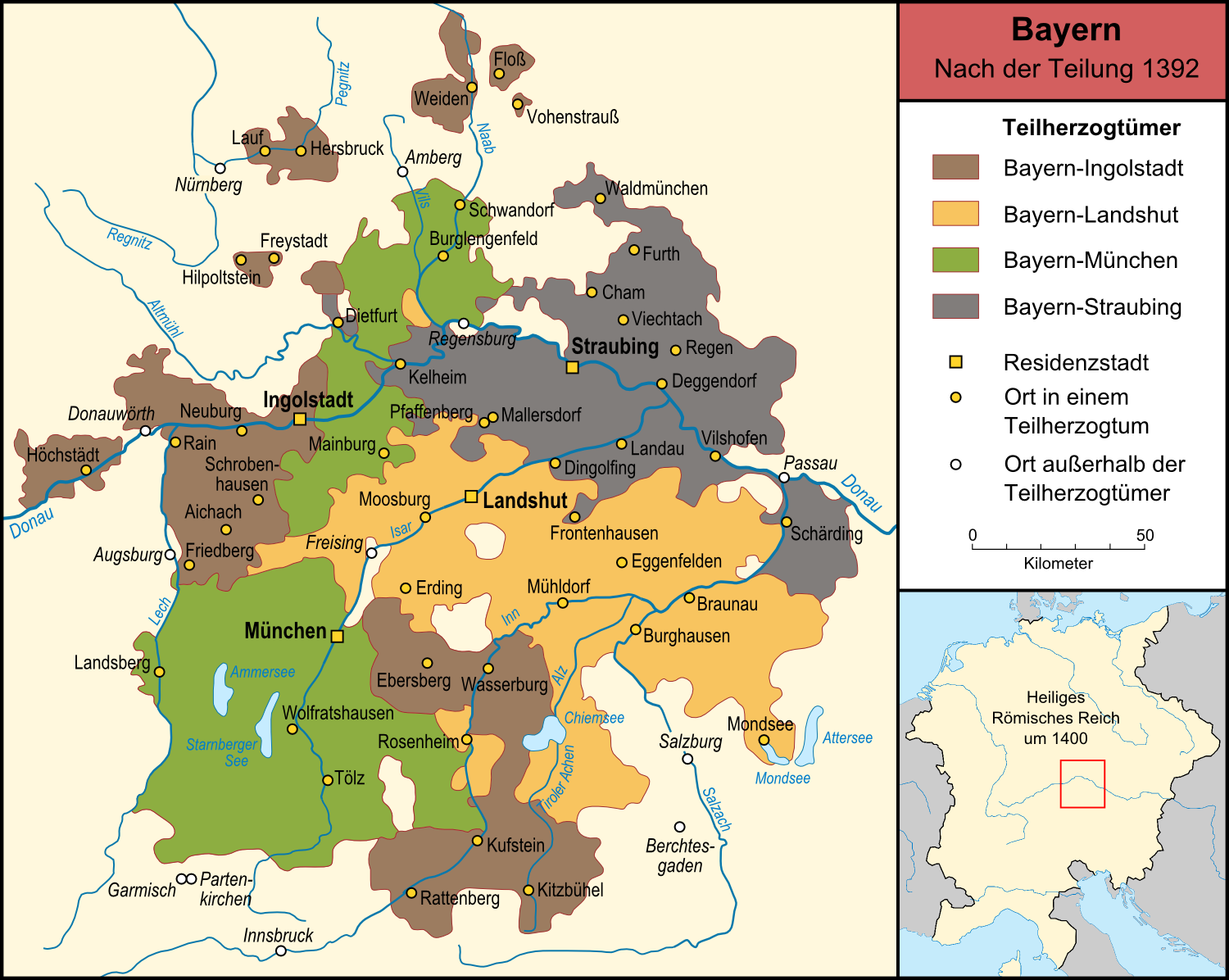
The four duchies of Bavaria 1392

=== Bavaria-Straubing ===
Albert I's duchy of Bavaria-Straubing passed with Holland and Hainaut on his death in 1404 to his son William II, and in 1417 to his younger son John III, who resigned the Bishopric of Liège to take up his new position. When John died in 1425 this family became extinct, and after a contest between various claimants, the three remaining branches of the Wittelsbach family Ingolstadt, Landshut and Munich partitioned Bavaria-Straubing between themselves. However, Holland and Hainaut passed to Burgundy.

=== Bavaria-Ingolstadt ===
Stephen III, duke of Bavaria-Ingolstadt, was renowned as a soldier rather than as a statesman. His rule saw struggles with various towns and with his brother, John of Bavaria-Munich. On his death in 1413 his son Louis VII, called the Bearded, succeeded. Before his accession, this restless and quarrelsome prince had played an important part in the affairs of France, where his sister Isabella had married King Charles VI. About 1417 he became involved in a violent quarrel with his cousin, Henry XVI of Bavaria-Landshut, fell under both the papal and the imperial ban, and in 1439 came under attack from his son, Louis VIII the Lame. This prince, who had married a daughter of Frederick I of Hohenzollern, margrave of Brandenburg, resented the favor shown by his father to an illegitimate son. Aided by Albert Achilles, afterward margrave of Brandenburg, he took the elder Louis prisoner and compelled him to abdicate in 1443. When Louis the Lame died in 1445 his father came into the power of his implacable enemy, Henry of Bavaria-Landshut, and died in prison in 1447.

=== Bavaria-Landshut ===
The duchy of Bavaria-Ingolstadt passed to Henry, who had succeeded his father Frederick as duke of Bavaria-Landshut in 1393, and whose long reign comprised almost entirely family feuds. He died in July 1450, and his son, Louis IX (called the Rich) succeeded. About this time Bavaria began to recover some of its former importance.

Louis IX expelled the Jews from his duchy, increased the security of traders, and improved both the administration of justice and the condition of the finances. In 1472 he founded the University of Ingolstadt, attempted to reform the monasteries, and successfully defeated Albert Achilles of Brandenburg. On the death of Louis IX in January 1479 his son George, also called the Rich, succeeded; and when George, a faithful adherent of the German king Maximilian I, died without sons in December 1503, a war broke out for the possession of his duchy.

=== Bavaria-Munich ===
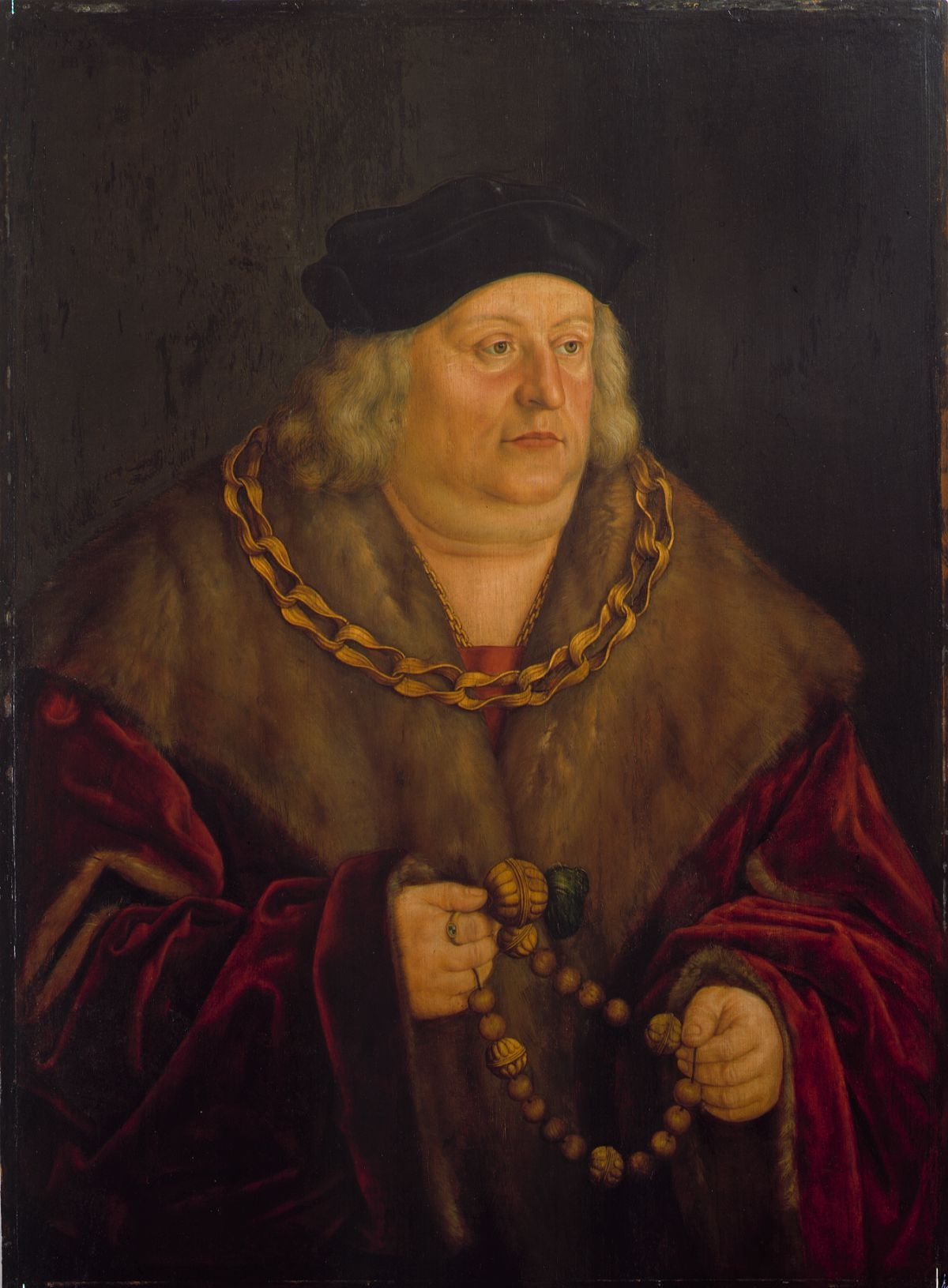
Albert IV of Bavaria

Bavaria-Munich passed on after the death of John II in 1397 to his sons Ernest and William III, but they only obtained possession of their lands after a struggle with Stephen of Bavaria-Ingolstadt. Both brothers then engaged in warfare with the other branches of the family and with the citizens of Munich. William III, a loyal servant of the emperor Sigismund, died in 1435, leaving an only son, Adolf, who died five years later; and Ernest, distinguished for his strength, died in 1438. In 1440 the whole of Bavaria-Munich came to Ernest's son Albert III, who had become estranged from his father owing to his union with the commoner Agnes Bernauer. Albert, whose attempts to reform the monasteries earned him the surname of Pious, almost became the elected king of Bohemia in 1440. He died in 1460, leaving five sons, the two elder of whom, John IV and Sigismund, reigned together until John's death in 1463. The third brother, Albert, who had been educated for the church, joined his brother in 1465, and when Sigismund abdicated two years later became sole ruler, in spite of the claims of his two younger brothers.

Albert IV, called the Wise, added the district of Abensberg to his possessions, and in 1504 became involved in the Landshut War of Succession which broke out for the possession of Bavaria-Landshut on the death of George the Rich. Albert's rival was George's son-in-law Rupert, formerly bishop of Freising and also the successor of Philip as count palatine of the Rhine. The emperor Maximilian I, interested as archduke of Austria and count of Tirol, interfered in the dispute. Rupert died in 1504, and the following year an arrangement was made at the Diet of Cologne by which the emperor and Philip's grandson, Otto Henry, obtained certain outlying districts, while Albert by securing the bulk of George's possessions united Bavaria under his rule. In 1506 Albert decreed that the duchy should thenceforth pass according to the rules of primogeniture, and in other ways endeavored to consolidate Bavaria. He was partially successful in improving the condition of the country, and in 1500 Bavaria formed one of the six circles into which Germany was divided for the maintenance of peace. Albert died in March 1508 and was succeeded by his son, William IV, whose mother Kunigunde was the daughter of the emperor Frederick III.

== Reunited duchy ==
=== Renaissance and Counter-Reformation ===
In spite of the decree of 1506, William IV was compelled to grant a share in the government in 1516 to his brother Louis X, an arrangement which lasted until the death of Louis in 1545.

William followed the traditional Wittelsbach policy of opposition to the Habsburgs until in 1534 he made a treaty at Linz with Ferdinand, the king of Hungary and Bohemia. This link strengthened in 1546, when the emperor Charles V obtained the help of the duke during the war of the league of Schmalkalden by promising him in certain eventualities the succession to the Bohemian throne, and the electoral dignity enjoyed by the count palatine of the Rhine. William also did much at a critical period to secure Bavaria for Catholicism. The reformed doctrines had made considerable progress in the duchy when the duke obtained extensive rights over the bishoprics and monasteries from the pope. He then took measures to repress the reformers, many of whom were banished; while the Jesuits, whom he invited into the duchy in 1541, made the Jesuit College of Ingolstadt, their headquarters in Germany. William, whose death occurred in March 1550 and was succeeded by his son Albert V, who had married a daughter of Ferdinand of Habsburg, afterward the emperor Ferdinand I. Early in his reign Albert made some concessions to the reformers, who were still strong in Bavaria; but about 1563 he changed his attitude, favored the decrees of the Council of Trent, and pressed forward the work of the Counter-Reformation. As education passed by degrees into the hands of the Jesuits, the progress of Protestantism was effectually arrested in Bavaria.

Albert V patronized art extensively. Artists of all kinds flocked to his court in Munich, and splendid buildings arose in the city, while Italy and elsewhere contributed to the collection of artistic works. The expenses of a magnificent court led the duke to quarrel with the Landschaft (the nobles), to oppress his subjects, and to leave a great burden of debt when he died in October 1579.

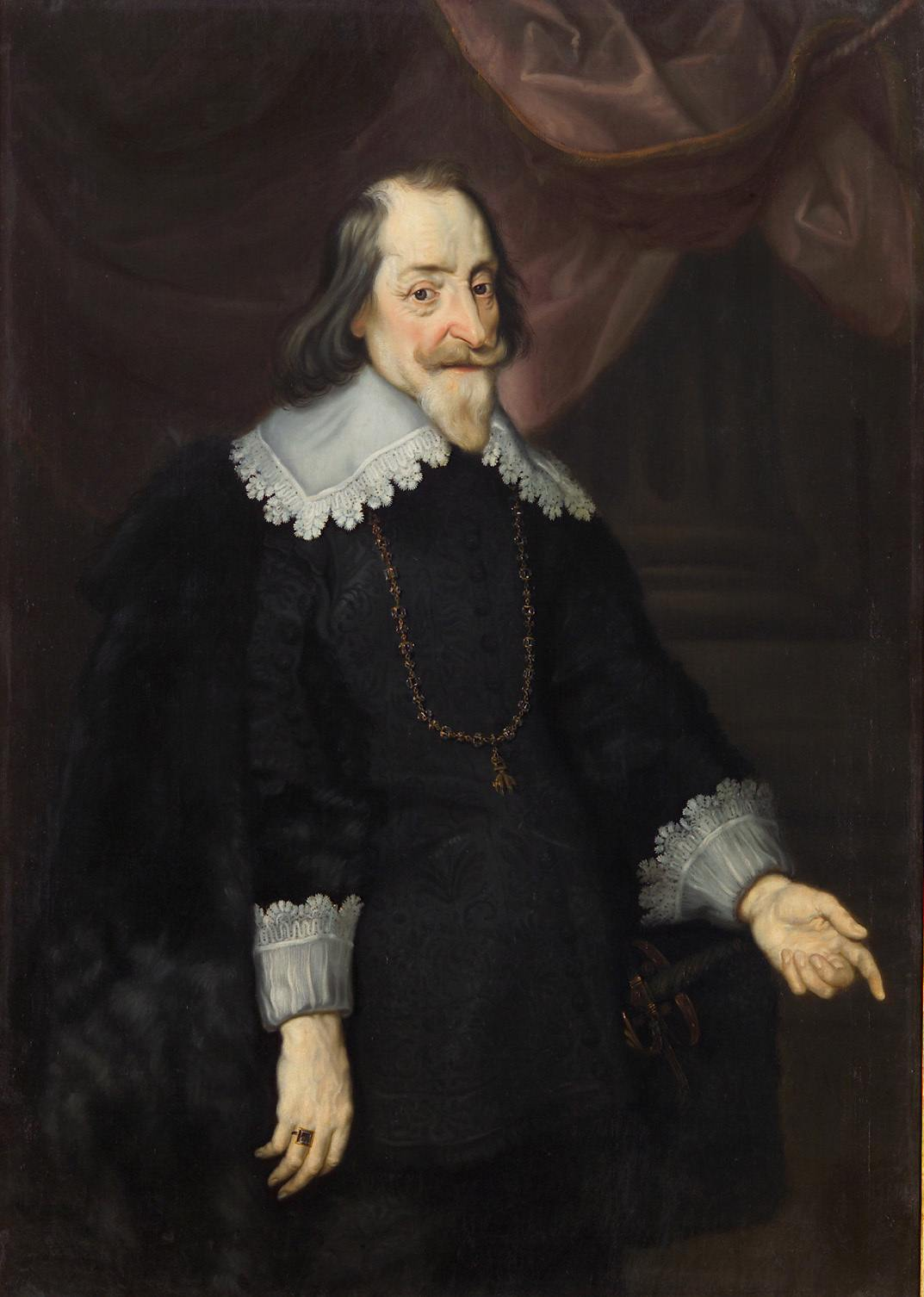
Maximilian I

The succeeding duke, Albert's son, William V (called the Pious), had received a Jesuit education and showed keen attachment to Jesuit tenets. He secured the Archbishopric of Cologne for his brother Ernest in 1583, and this dignity remained in the possession of the family for nearly 200 years. In 1597 he abdicated in favor of his son Maximilian I, and retired to a monastery, where he died in 1626.

=== Thirty Years' War ===
Maximilian I found the duchy encumbered with debt and filled with disorder, but ten years of his vigorous rule effected a remarkable change. The finances and the judicial system were reorganized, a class of civil servants and a national militia founded, and several small districts were brought under the duke's authority. The result was unity and order in the duchy which enabled Maximilian to play an important part in the Thirty Years' War; during the earlier years of which he was so successful as to acquire the Upper Palatinate and the electoral dignity which had been enjoyed since 1356 by the elder branch of the Wittelsbach family. In spite of subsequent reverses, Maximilian retained these gains at the Peace of Westphalia in 1648. During the later years of this war Bavaria, especially the northern part, suffered severely. In 1632 the Swedes invaded, and when Maximilian violated the treaty of Ulm in 1647, the French and the Swedes ravaged the land. After repairing this damage to some extent, the elector died at Ingolstadt in September 1651, leaving his duchy much stronger than he had found it. The recovery of the Upper Palatinate made Bavaria compact; the acquisition of the electoral vote made it influential, and the duchy was able to play a part in European politics which internal strife had rendered impossible for the past four hundred years.

== Electorate of Bavaria ==
=== Absolutism ===
The international position won by Maximilian I adds to the ducal house, on Bavaria itself its effect during the next two centuries were most dubious. Maximilian's son, Ferdinand Maria (1651–1679), who was a minor when he succeeded, tried to repair the wounds caused by the Thirty Years' War, encouraging agriculture and industries and building or restoring numerous churches and monasteries. In 1669, moreover, he again called a meeting of the diet, which had been suspended since 1612.

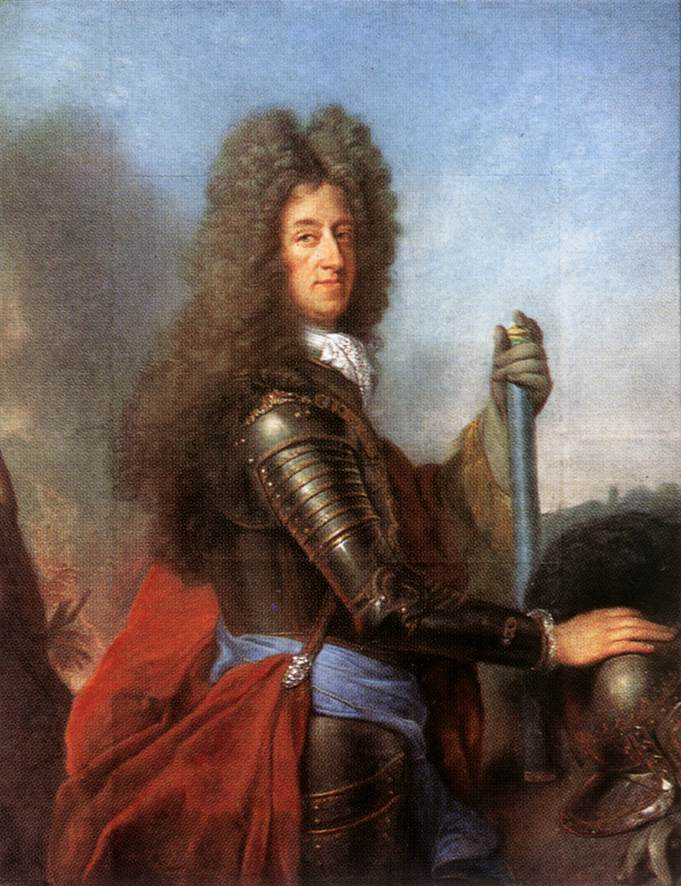
Maximilian II Emanuel

His good work, however, was largely undone by his son Maximilian II Emanuel (1679–1726), whose far-reaching ambition set him warring against the Ottoman Empire and, on the side of France, in the great struggle of the Spanish succession. He shared in the defeat at the Battle of Blenheim, near Höchstädt, on 13 August 1704; his dominions were temporarily partitioned between Austria and the elector palatine by the Treaty of Ilbersheim, and only restored to him, harried and exhausted, at the Treaty of Baden in 1714; the first Bavarian peasant insurrection, known as the Bloody Christmas of Sendling, having been crushed by the Austrian occupiers in 1706.

Untaught by Maximilian II Emmanuel's experience, his son, Charles Albert (1726–1745), devoted all his energies to increasing the European prestige and power of his house. The death of the emperor Charles VI proved his opportunity: he disputed the validity of the Pragmatic Sanction which secured the Habsburg succession to Maria Theresa, allied himself with France, conquered Upper Austria, was crowned king of Bohemia at Prague and, in 1742, emperor at Frankfurt. The price he had to pay, however, was the occupation of Bavaria itself by Austrian troops; and, though the invasion of Bohemia in 1744 by Frederick II of Prussia enabled him to return to Munich, at his death on 20 January 1745 it was left to his successor to make what terms he could for the recovery of his dominions.

Maximilian III Joseph (1745–1777), called "Max the much-beloved", by the peace of Füssen, signed on 22 April 1745, obtained the restitution of his dominions in return for a formal acknowledgment of the Pragmatic Sanction. He was a man of enlightenment, did much to encourage agriculture, industries and the exploitation of the mineral wealth of the country, founded the Academy of Sciences at Munich, and abolished the Jesuit censorship of the press. At the same time, the elector signed more death sentences than any of his predecessors ever had. On 30 December 1777, when he died, the Bavarian line of the Wittelsbachs became extinct, and the succession passed to Charles Theodore, the elector palatine. After a separation of four and a half centuries, the Electorate of the Palatinate, to which the duchies of Jülich and Berg had been added, was thus reunited with Bavaria.

=== Revolutionary and Napoleonic periods ===
Bavaria within the Rheinbund in 1807

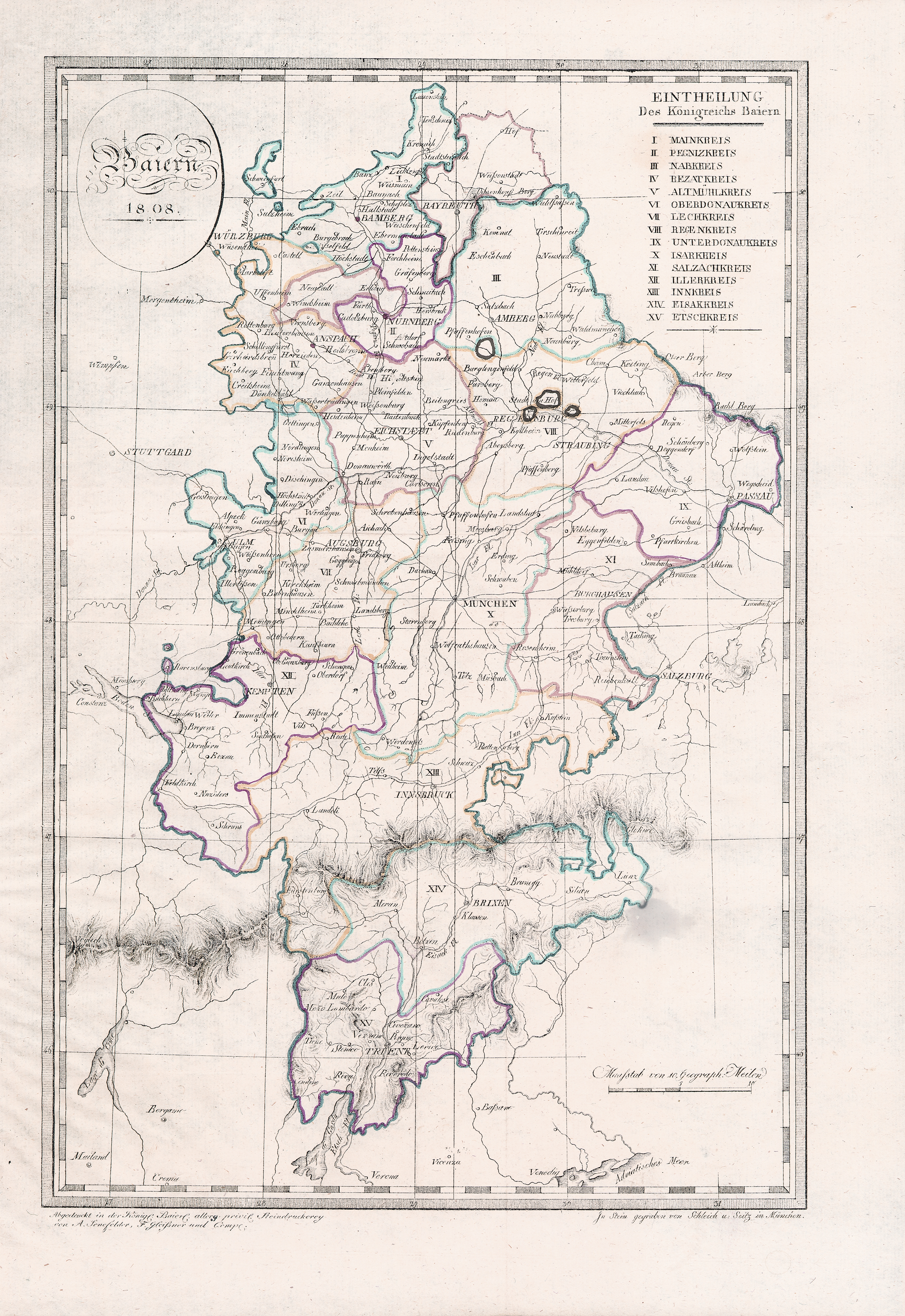
Bavaria and its subdivisions, as at 1808

In 1792, French revolutionary armies overran the Palatinate; in 1795 the French, under Moreau, invaded Bavaria itself and advanced to Munich where they were received with joy by the long-suppressed Liberals, and laid siege to Ingolstadt. Charles Theodore, who had done nothing to prevent wars or to resist the invasion, fled to Saxony and abandoned a regency whose members signed a convention with Moreau, by which he granted an armistice in return for a heavy contribution (7 September 1796).

Between the French and the Austrians, Bavaria was now in a bad situation. Even before the death of Charles Theodore on 16 February 1799, the Austrians had again occupied the country, in preparation for renewing the war with France. The new elector, Maximilian IV Joseph (of Zweibrücken), succeeded to a difficult inheritance. Though both he and his all-powerful minister, Maximilian von Montgelas sympathized more with France than Austria, the state of the Bavarian finances, and the fact that the Bavarian troops were scattered and disorganized, placed him helpless in the hands of Austria. On 2 December 1800, the Bavarian armies were involved in the Austrian defeat at Hohenlinden, and Moreau once more occupied Munich. By the Treaty of Lunéville (9 February 1801) Bavaria lost the Palatinate and the duchies of Zweibrücken and Jülich.

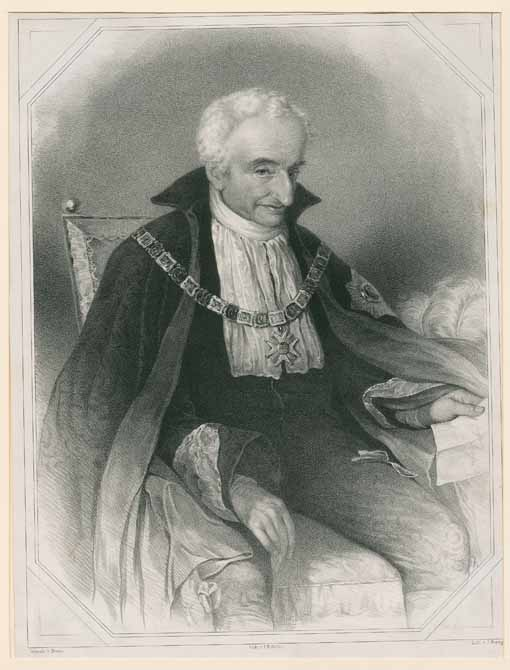
Count Montgelas

In view of the scarcely disguised ambitions and intrigues of the Austrian court, Montgelas now believed that the interests of Bavaria lay in a frank alliance with the French Republic; he succeeded in overcoming the reluctance of Maximilian Joseph and on 24 August a separate treaty of peace and alliance with France was signed in Paris. By the third article of this the First Consul undertook to see that the compensation promised under the 7th article of the treaty of Lunéville for the territory ceded on the left bank of the Rhine, should be carried out at the expense of the Empire in the manner most agreeable to Bavaria (see de Martens, Recueil, vol. vii. p. 365).

Thus in 1803, in accordance to this agreement, in the territorial rearrangements consequent on Napoleon's suppression of the ecclesiastical states and of many free cities of the Empire, Bavaria received the bishoprics of Würzburg, Bamberg, Augsburg and Freisingen, part of that of Passau, the territories of twelve abbeys, and seventeen cities and villages. The whole form a compact territory which more than compensated for the loss of her outlying provinces on the Rhine. Montgelas now aspired to raise Bavaria to the rank of a first-rate power and he pursued this object during the Napoleonic epoch with consummate skill, allowing fully for the preponderance of France – so long as it lasted – but never permitting Bavaria to sink, like so many of the states of the Confederation of the Rhine, into mere French dependency. In the war of 1805, in accordance with a treaty of alliance signed at Würzburg on 23 September, Bavarian troops, for the first time since the days of Charles VII, fought side by side with the French, and by the Treaty of Pressburg, signed on 26 December, the Principality of Eichstädt, the Margraviate of Burgau, the Lordship of Vorarlberg, the counties of Hohenems and Königsegg-Rothenfels, the lordships of Argen and Tettnang, and the city of Lindau with its territory was to be added to Bavaria. On the other hand, Würzburg, obtained in 1803, was to be ceded by Bavaria to the elector of Salzburg in exchange for Tirol. By the 1st article of the treaty, the emperor acknowledged the assumption by the elector of the title of king, as Maximilian I. The price which Maximilian had reluctantly to pay for this accession of dignity was the marriage of his daughter Augusta with Eugène de Beauharnais. On 15 March 1806 he ceded the Duchy of Berg to Napoleon.

For the internal constitution of Bavaria also the French alliance had noteworthy consequences. Maximilian himself was an "enlightened" prince of the 18th-century type, whose tolerant principles had already grievously offended his clerical subjects. Montgelas was a firm believer in drastic reform "from above", and, in 1803, had discussed with the rump of the old estates the question of reforms. But the revolutionary changes introduced by the constitution proclaimed on 1 May 1808 were due to the direct influence of Napoleon. A clean sweep was made of the medieval polity surviving in the somnolent local diets and corporations. In place of the old system of privileges and exemptions were set equality before the law, universal liability to taxation, the abolition of serfdom, the security of person and property, liberty of conscience and of the press. A representative assembly was created on paper, based on a narrow franchise and with very limited powers, but was never summoned.

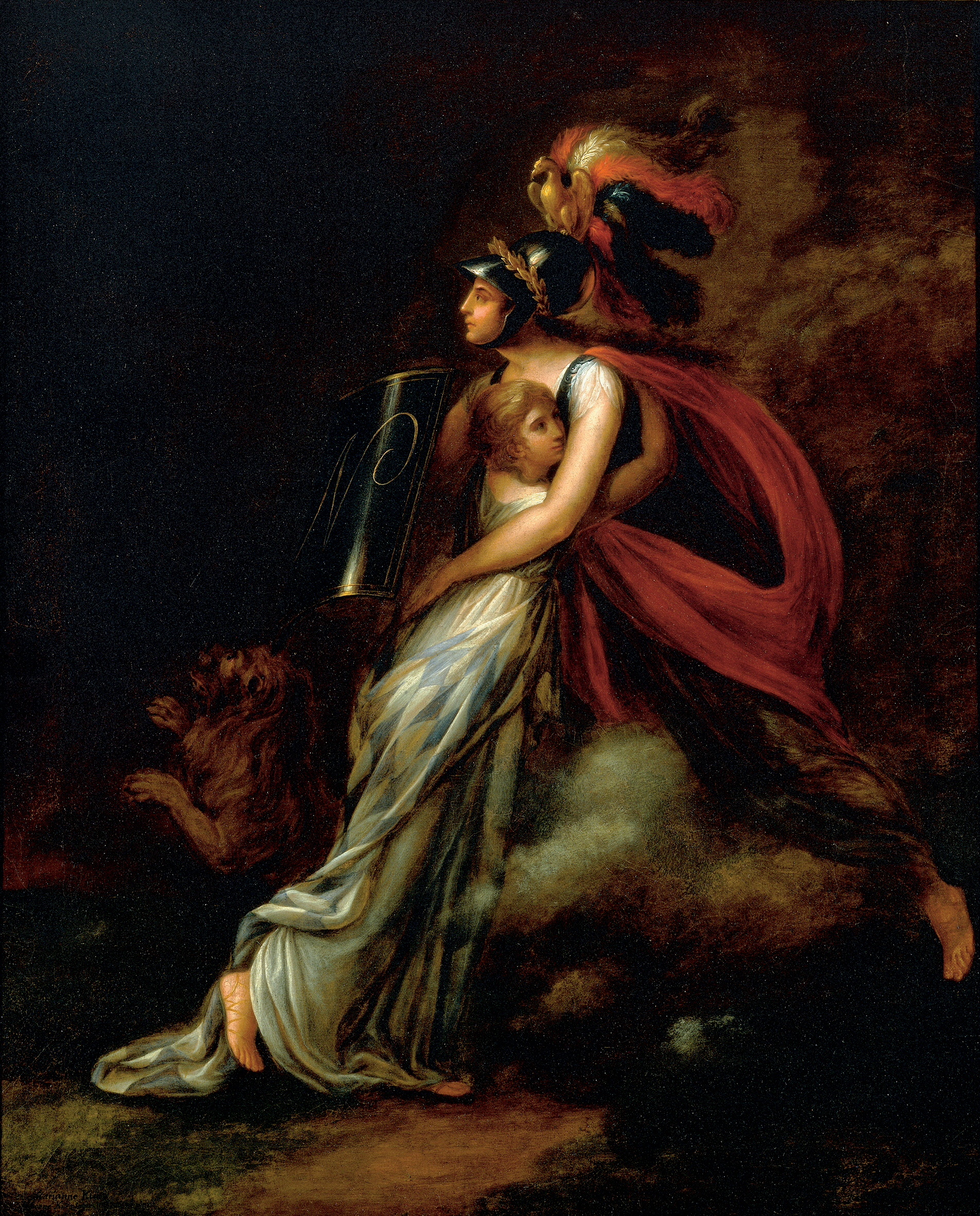
Gallia Protects Bavaria, 1809 painting by Marianne Kürzinger. An allegory, it symbolises the alliance between Napoleon's France and Bavaria.

In 1809 Bavaria was again engaged in war with Austria on the side of France. The Tyroleans rose up against the Bavarian authority and succeeded three times in defeating Bavarian and French troops trying to retake the country. Austria lost the war of the Fifth Coalition against France, and got even harsher terms in the Treaty of Schönbrunn in 1809. Often glorified as Tirol's national hero, Andreas Hofer, the leader of the uprising, was executed in 1810 in Mantua, having lost a third and final battle against the French and Bavarian forces. By the treaty signed at Paris on 28 February 1810, Bavaria ceded southern Tirol to Italy and some small districts to Württemberg, receiving as compensation parts of Salzburg, the Innviertel and Hausruck and the principalities of Bayreuth and Regensburg. So far the policy of Montgelas had been brilliantly successful, but the star of Napoleon had now reached its zenith and already the astute opportunist had noted the signs of the coming change.

The events of 1812 followed; in 1813 Bavaria was summoned to join the alliance against Napoleon, the demand being passionately backed by the crown prince Louis and by Marshal Wrede; on 8 October the treaty of Ried was signed, by which Bavaria threw in her lot with the Allies. Montgelas announced to the French ambassador that he had been compelled temporarily to bow before the storm, adding "Bavaria has need of France". (For Bavaria's share in the war see Napoleonic Campaigns.)

== Kingdom of Bavaria ==
=== Constitution and Revolution ===
Immediately after the first peace of Paris (1814), Bavaria ceded to Austria the northern Tyrol and Vorarlberg; during the Congress of Vienna it was decided that Bavaria would also cede to the Austrians the greater part of Salzburg and the Innviertel and Hausruck. Bavaria received as compensation, besides Würzburg and Aschaffenburg, the Palatinate (region) on the left bank of the Rhine and certain districts of Hesse-Darmstadt and of the former Abbacy of Fulda. But with the collapse of France, the old fears and jealousies against Austria were revived in full force, and Bavaria only agreed to these cessions (treaty of Munich, 16 April 1816) under the promise that, in the event of the powers ignoring her claim to the Baden succession in favor of that of the line of the counts of Hochberg, she should receive also the Palatinate on the right bank of the Rhine. The question was thus left open, the tension between the two powers remained high, and the war was only averted by the authority of the Grand Alliance. At the Congress of Aix (1818) the question of the Baden succession was settled in favor of the Hochberg line, without the compensation stipulated in the treaty of Munich; and by the treaty of Frankfurt, signed on behalf of the four great powers on 20 July 1819, the territorial issues between Bavaria and Austria were settled, in spite of the protests of the former, in the general sense of the arrangement made at Vienna. A small strip of territory was added, to connect Bavaria with the Palatinate, and Bavarian troops were to garrison the federal fortress of Mainz.

Meanwhile, on 1 February 1817, Montgelas had been dismissed; and Bavaria had entered on a new era of constitutional reform. This implied no breach with the European policy of the fallen minister. In the new German confederation, Bavaria had assumed the role of defender of the smaller states against the ambitions of Austria and Prussia. Montgelas had dreamed of a Bavarian hegemony in South Germany similar to that of Prussia in the north. It was to obtain popular support for this policy and for the Bavarian claims on Baden that the crown prince pressed for a liberal constitution, the reluctance of Montgelas to concede it is the cause of his dismissal.

On 26 May 1818, the constitution was proclaimed. The parliament was to consist of two houses; the first comprising the great hereditary landowners, government officials, and nominees of the crown; the second, elected on a very narrow franchise, comprising representatives of the small land-owners, the towns, and the peasants. By additional articles the equality of religions was guaranteed and the rights of Protestants safeguarded, concessions which were denounced at Rome as a breach of the Concordat, which had been signed immediately before. The result of the constitutional experiment hardly justified the royal expectations; the parliament was hardly opened (5 February 1819) before the doctrinaire radicalism of some of its members, culminating in the demand that the army should swear allegiance to the constitution, so alarmed the king that he appealed to Austria and Germany, undertaking to carry out any repressive measures they might recommend. Prussia, however, refused to approve of any coup d'état; the parliament, chastened by the consciousness that its life depended on the goodwill of the king, moderated its tone; and Maximilian ruled till his death as a model constitutional monarch. On 13 October 1825, his son Ludwig I succeeded him.

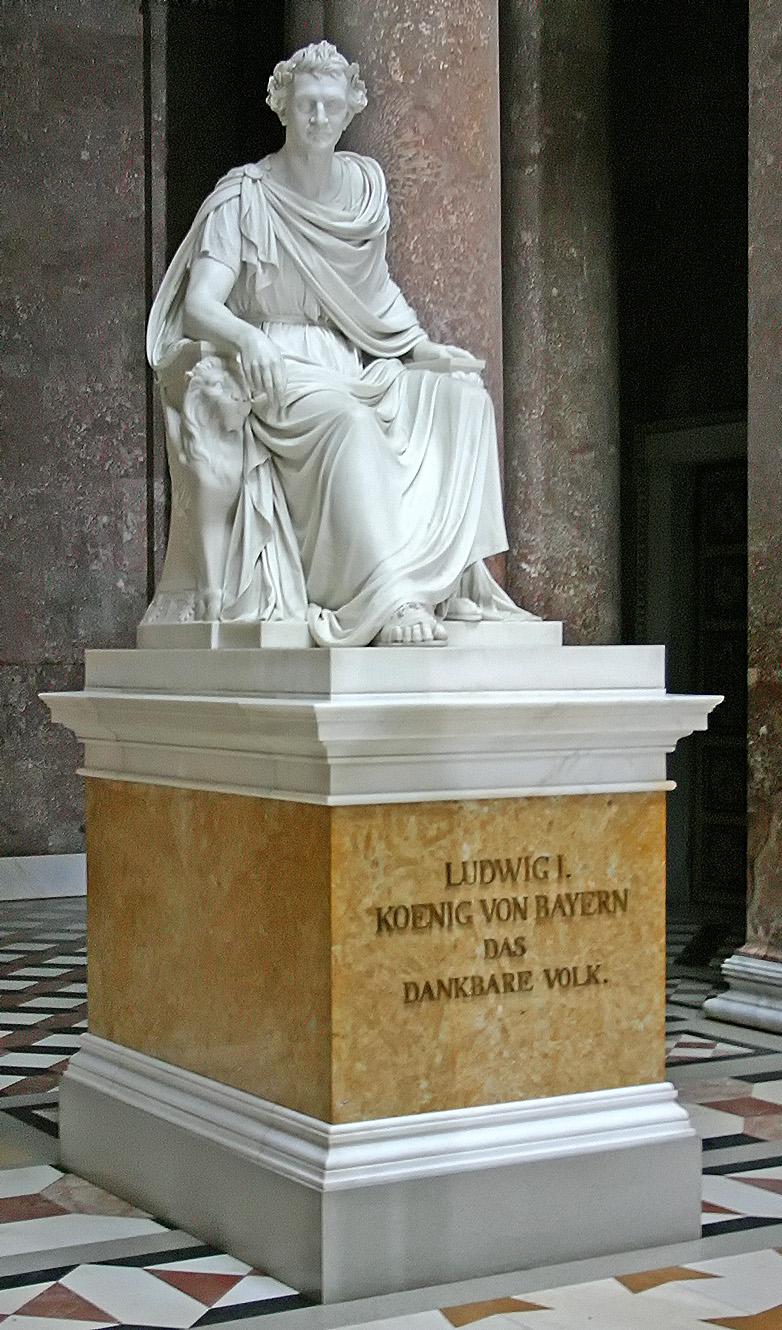
King Ludwig I

Ludwig proved an enlightened patron of the arts and sciences, who transferred the Ludwig-Maximilians-Universität from Landshut to Munich, which, by his magnificent taste in building, he transformed into one of the most beautiful cities of the continent. The earlier years of his reign were marked by a liberal spirit and the reform, especially, of the financial administration; but the revolutions of 1830 frightened him into reaction, which was accentuated by the opposition of the parliament to his expenditure on building and works of art. In 1837, the Ultramontanes came into power with Karl von Abel (1788–1859) as prime minister. The Jesuits now gained the upper hand; one by one the liberal provisions of the constitution were modified or annulled; the Protestants were harried and oppressed, and rigorous censorship forbade any free discussion of internal politics. The collapse of this régime was due, not to popular agitation, but to the resentment of Ludwig at the clerical opposition to the influence of his mistress, Lola Montez. On 17 February 1847, Abel was dismissed for publishing his memorandum against the proposal to naturalize Lola, who was an Irishwoman; and the Protestant Georg Ludwig von Maurer took his place. The new ministry granted the certificate of naturalization; but riots, in which Ultramontane professors of the university took part, resulted. The professors were deprived, the parliament dissolved, and, on 27 November, the ministry dismissed. Lola Montez created Countess Landsfeld, became supreme in the state; and the new minister, Prince Ludwig of Öttingen-Wallerstein (1791–1870), in spite of his efforts to enlist Liberal sympathy by appeals to pan-German patriotism, was powerless to form a stable government. His cabinet was known as the Lolaministerium; in February 1848, stimulated by the news from Paris (Revolution of 1848 in France), riots broke out against the countess; on 11 March the king dismissed Öttingen, and on 20 March, realizing the force of public opinion against him, abdicated in favor of his son, Maximilian II.

Before his abdication Ludwig had issued, on 6 March 1848, a proclamation promising the zealous co-operation of the Bavarian government in the work of German freedom and unity (see German revolutions of 1848–1849). To the spirit of this Maximilian was faithful, accepting the authority of the central government at Frankfurt and on 19 December the sanctioning of the official promulgation of the laws were passed by the German parliament. But Prussia was henceforth the enemy, not Austria. In refusing to agree to the offer of the imperial crown to Frederick William IV, Maximilian had the support of his parliament. In withholding his assent to the new German constitution, by which Austria was excluded from the Confederation, he ran indeed counter to the sentiment of his people; but by this time the back of the revolution was broken, and in the events which led to the humiliation of Prussia at Olmütz in 1851, and the restoration of the old diet of the Confederation, Bavaria was safe in casting in her lot with Austria (see History of Germany).

The guiding spirit in this anti-Prussian policy, which characterized Bavarian statesmanship up to the war of 1866, was Baron Karl Ludwig von der Pfordten (1811–1880), who became minister for foreign affairs on 19 April 1849. His idea for the ultimate solution of the question of the balance of power in Germany was the so-called Trias, i.e. a league of the Rhenish states as a counterpoise to the preponderance of Austria and Prussia. In internal affairs, his ministry was characterized by a reactionary policy less severe than elsewhere in Germany, which led none-the-less from 1854 onward to a struggle with the parliament, which ended in the dismissal of Pfordten's ministry on 27 March 1859. He was succeeded by Karl Freiherr von Schrenk von Notzing (1806–1884), an official of Liberal tendencies who had been a Bavarian representative in the diet of the Confederation. Important reforms were now introduced, including the separation of the judicial and executive powers and the drawing up of a new criminal code. In foreign affairs Schrenk, like his predecessor, aimed at safeguarding the independence of Bavaria, and supported the idea of superseding the actual constitution of the Confederation by a supreme directory, in which Bavaria, as leader of the purely German states, would hold the balance between Prussia and Austria. Bavaria accordingly opposed the Prussian proposals for the reorganization of the Confederation, and one of the last acts of King Maximilian was to take a conspicuous part in the assembly of princes summoned to Frankfurt in 1863 by the emperor Francis Joseph.

Maximilian was succeeded on 10 March 1864 by his son Ludwig II, a youth of eighteen. The government was at first carried on by Schrenk and Pfordten in concert. Schrenk soon retired, when the Bavarian government found it necessary, in order to maintain its position in the Prussian Zollverein, to become a party to the Prussian commercial treaty with France, signed in 1862. In the complicated Schleswig-Holstein question Bavaria, under Pfordten's guidance, consistently opposed Prussia, and headed the lesser states in their support of Frederick of Augustenburg against the policy of the two great German powers. Finally, in the war of 1866, in spite of Bismarck's efforts to secure her neutrality, Bavaria sided actively with Austria.

=== German Empire ===
The rapid victory of the Prussians and the wise moderation of Bismarck paved the way for a complete revolution in Bavaria's relation to Prussia and the German question. The South German Confederation, contemplated by the 6th article of the Treaty of Prague, never came into being; and, though Prussia, in order not to excite the alarm of France, opposed the suggestion that the southern states should join the North German Confederation, the bonds of Bavaria (as of the other southern states) with the north were strengthened by an offensive and defensive alliance with Prussia, as the result of Napoleon's demand for "compensation" in the Palatinate. This was signed at Berlin on 22 August 1866, on the same day as the signature of the formal treaty of peace between the two countries. The separatist ambitions of Bavaria were thus formally given up; she had no longer "need of France"; and during the Franco-Prussian War, the Bavarian army marched, under the command of the Prussian crown prince, against Germany's common enemy. It was on the proposal of King Ludwig II that the imperial crown was offered to King Wilhelm I of Prussia.

Bavaria and the German Empire

This was preceded, on 23 November 1870, by the signature of a treaty between Bavaria and the North German Confederation. By this instrument, though Bavaria became an integral part of the new German empire, she reserved a larger measure of sovereign independence than any of the other constituent states. Thus she retained a separate diplomatic service, military administration, and postal, telegraph, and railway systems. The treaty was ratified by the Bavarian chambers on 21 January 1871, though not without considerable opposition on the part of the so-called Patriot Party. Their hostility was increased by the Kulturkampf, due to the promulgation in 1870 of the dogma of papal infallibility. The Ludwig-Maximilians-Universität München, where Ignaz von Döllinger was professor, became the center of the opposition to the new dogma, and the Old Catholics were protected by the king and the government. The federal law expelling the Jesuits was proclaimed in Bavaria on 6 September 1871 and was extended to the Redemptorists in 1873. On 31 March 1871, moreover, the bonds with the rest of the empire had been drawn closer by the acceptance of a number of laws of the North German Confederation, of which the most important was the new criminal code, which was finally put into force in Bavaria in 1879. The opposition of the Patriot Party, however, reinforced by the strong Catholic sentiment of the country, continued and it was only the steady support given by the king to successive Liberal ministries that prevented its finding disastrous expression in the parliament, where it remained in a majority till 1887, and subsequently, as the Centre Party, continued to form the most compact party.

Ludwig II, whose passion for building palaces and near-total neglect of his governmental duties were becoming a serious crisis, was declared insane and on 10 June 1886, his uncle, Prince Luitpold, became the regent. Three days later on 13 June, Ludwig II was found dead in Lake Starnberg. The question of whether his death was self-imposed, accidental or the result of malicious conspirators remains unanswered. However, it was reported at the time and today is widely accepted that it was a suicide. Due to the insanity of Ludwig's brother, King Otto I, Prince Luitpold continued as regent.

After 1871, Bavaria shared to the full in the rapid development of Germany; but her particularism, founded on traditional racial and religious antagonism to the Prussians, was by no means dead, though it exhibited itself in no more dangerous form than the prohibition, reissued in 1900, to display any but the Bavarian flag on public buildings on the emperor's birthday; a provision which was subsequently modified so as to allow the Bavarian and imperial flags to be hung side by side.

Following Prince Luitpold's death in 1912, his son, Prince Ludwig, became the regent. A year later, Ludwig deposed his cousin, Otto, and proclaimed himself King Ludwig III of Bavaria. During the First World War, Ludwig's eldest son, Crown Prince Rupprecht, commanded the Bavarian army and became one of the leading German commanders on the Western Front.

== Modern times ==
=== Bavaria during the Weimar Republic ===
Bavaria during Weimar Republic. The western territory of Bavaria is the Rhenish Palatinate, which became part of Rhineland-Palatinate after the end of World War II.

Republican institutions replaced royal ones in Bavaria during the upheavals of November 1918. Provisional National Council Minister-President Kurt Eisner declared the establishment of the People's State of Bavaria on 8 November 1918. Eisner was assassinated on 21 February 1919 ultimately leading to a Communist revolt and the short lived Bavarian Socialist Republic (Bayerische Räterepublik or Münchner Räterepublik) being proclaimed from 6 April 1919. After violent suppression by elements of the German Army and notably the Freikorps, the Bavarian Socialist Republic fell on 3 May 1919. The Bamberg Constitution (Bamberger Verfassung) was enacted on 14 August 1919 creating the Free State of Bavaria within the Weimar Republic.

Munich became a hotbed of extremism: the 1919 Bavarian Soviet Republic and the 1923 Beer Hall Putsch involving Erich Ludendorff and Adolf Hitler took place in the same city. For most of the Weimar Republic, though, Bavaria was dominated by the relatively mainstream conservative Bavarian People's Party. The BPP was a Catholic party that represented the Bavarian tradition of particularist conservatism, through which monarchists and even separatist sentiments were conveyed. An attempt supported by a wide coalition of parties, to establish Rupprecht, Crown Prince of Bavaria, as a Staatskommisar with dictatorial powers in 1932 to counter the Nazis failed due to the hesitant Bavarian government under Heinrich Held.

=== Bavaria during the Nazi era ===
With the rise of the Nazis to power in 1933, the Bavarian parliament was dissolved without new elections. Instead, the seats were allocated according to the results in the national election of March 1933, giving the Nazis and its coalition partner, the DNVP, a narrow two-seat majority due to the fact that the seats won by the KPD were declared void. With this controlling power, the NSDAP was declared the only legal party and all other parties in Germany and Bavaria were dissolved. In 1934, the Bavarian parliament was, like all other state parliaments, dissolved too. Shortly after, Bavaria itself was broken up during the reorganization of the Reich. Instead of the states, Reichsgaue were established as administrative sub-divisions. Bavaria was split into six regions, the Reichsgaue Schwaben, München-Oberbayern, Bayerische Ostmark, Franken, Main-Franken and Westmark.

Map of Nazi Germany showing its administrative subdivisions, the Reichsgaue

During the 12 years of Nazi rule, Bavaria was one of Hitler's favorite locations, and he spent much time in his residence at the Obersalzberg. The KZ (concentration camp) in Dachau, near Munich, was the first to be established. But Bavaria was also the scene of passive resistance to the regime, the most well known of this being the White Rose. Nuremberg, Bavaria's second-largest city, became the scene of massive rallies, the Reichsparteitage. Ironically, the last of those in 1939, titled Reichsparteitag des Friedens (Reichsparteitag of peace), was canceled due to the outbreak of the second world war. After the war, the city was chosen for this reason to become the location of the war crimes trials, the Nuremberg Military Tribunals.

Bavaria had approximately 54,000 Jewish people living in its borders at the turn of the 20th century. By 1933, still 41,000 lived in the state. By 1939, this number had shrunk to 16,000. Few of those survived the Nazi rule.

=== Bavaria during the Federal Republic of Germany ===
Following the end of World War II, Bavaria was occupied by US forces, who reestablished the state on 19 September 1945. In 1946 Bavaria lost its district on the Rhine, the Palatinate. The destruction caused by aerial bombings during the war, alongside the arrival of refugees from the parts of Germany now under Soviet occupation, caused major problems for the authorities. By September 1950, 2,155,000 expellees had found refuge in Bavaria, nearly 27 percent of the population. Of these, 1,025,000 were Sudeten Germans from Bohemia and Moravia and 459,000 were Germans from Polish-annexed Silesia. A further large group were German-speakers from Hungary. In the following decades, Sudeten Germans were acknowledged as Bavaria's fourth largest ethnic group, along with Bavarians, Franconians, and Swabians.

Bavaria is home to the Bavarian Party, founded in 1946, whose goal is to establish an independent Bavarian state. For a time, the idea that Bavaria might become independent again was seriously entertained by the Allied occupation authorities, along with a possible union between Bavaria and Austria. With the onset of the Cold War, support for Bavarian independence evaporated both within Bavaria and from the Western allies, and Bavaria became one of the constituent states of the new Bundesrepublik in 1949.

Three years prior, the first post-World War II state elections had been held on 30 June 1946, when 180 delegates were chosen. The main task of those delegates was to draft a new Bavarian constitution since the day-to-day running of the state still lay with the US authorities. The new constitution was accepted by a public vote on 1 December 1946, the same day the first post-war state parliament (German: Landtag) was elected. Bavaria was politically dominated by the Christian Social Union (CSU), sister party of the Christian Democratic Union, the main center-right party in Germany, until 1954. Bavaria was then governed by a coalition under the leadership of the Social Democratic Party of Germany, returning to the CSU in 1957.

Since the 1960s Bavaria has seen a dynamic development to one of Europe's leading economic zones, the country is no longer mainly an agricultural region but hosts a variety of high tech industries.

After the CSU lost more than 17% of the votes in the Bavarian state elections of 2008, incumbent Minister-President Günther Beckstein and Chairman of the CSU, Erwin Huber, announced their resignations. Horst Seehofer was quickly proposed as their successor. At a party convention on 25 October, he was affirmed as the new Chairman of the CSU, and on 27 October he was elected Minister-President by the Landtag with votes from the Free Democratic Party, forming the first coalition government in Bavaria since 1962.

In 2008, Bavaria became the first federal state of Germany to completely ban smoking in bars and restaurants. After this restriction was criticized as being "too harsh" by some members of the CSU, it was relaxed one year later. Supporters of smoking bans then brought about a public referendum on the issue, which led to even firmer restrictions than the initial ban. Thereafter, a more comprehensive ban was introduced in 2010.

== See also ==
- List of rulers of Bavaria
- List of minister-presidents of Bavaria
- Kingdom of Bavaria
- Free State of Bavaria (Weimar Republic)
- History of Franconia
- Haus der Bayerischen Geschichte: Museum

History of cities in Bavaria

- Timeline of Augsburg
- History of Munich and Timeline of Munich
- Timeline of Nuremberg

== Bibliography ==
- Bischel, Matthias (2019). "An English-Language Bibliography on Bavarian History: Academic Publications of the Last Fifty Years". Bavarian Studies in History and Culture. Archived from the original on 7 April 2022.
- Fishman, Joshua A.; García, Ofelia (2011). Handbook of Language and Ethnic Identity: The Success-Failure Continuum in Language and Ethnic Identity Efforts Volume 2. Oxford: Oxford University Press. ISBN 9780195392456.
- James, Peter (1995). The Politics of Bavaria an Exception to the Rule: The Special Position of the Free State of Bavaria in the New Germany. Aldershot: Avebury. ISBN 9781859721667.
- Myers, Paul F.; Mouldin, Wayman Parker (1952). Population of the Federal Republic of Germany and West Berlin. Washington DC: U.S. Department of Commerce, Bureau of the Census. OCLC 4137697.
- Neumann, Günter (2000), "Juthungen § 1. Der Name", in Beck, Heinrich; Geuenich, Dieter; Steuer, Heiko (eds.), Reallexikon der Germanischen Altertumskunde, vol. 16 (2 ed.), De Gruyter, pp. 141–142, ISBN 978-3-11-016782-5
- Reindel, K (1981). "Die Bajuwaren. Quellen, Hypothesen, Tatsachen". Deutsches Archiv für Erforschung des Mittelalters. 37 (2): 451–473. doi:10.7788/daem.1981.37.2.451.
- Schutz, H. (2000). The Germanic Realms in Pre-Carolingian Central Europe, 400-750. New York: Peter Lang.
- Steinberger, Rolf (2008). Austria, Germany, and the Cold War: From the Anschluss to the State Treaty. New York: Berghahn Books. p. 41. ISBN 9781845453268.
- Strayer, J., ed. (1983). Dictionary of the Middle Ages. New York: Charles Scribner's Sons.
- Wolfram, H.; Pohl, W., eds. (1990). Typen der Ethnogenese unter besonderer Berücksichtigung der Bayern. Vol. 1. Vienna: Verlag der österreichischen Akademie der Wissenschaften.
