= Meinhard III =

Meinhard III may refer to:

- Meinhard III, Count of Gorizia (died 1258), also Count of Tyrol
- Meinhard III, Count of Tyrol (died 1363), also Count of Gorizia
