= Margaret, Countess of Tyrol =

Countess of Tyrol (1318-1369)

Margaret
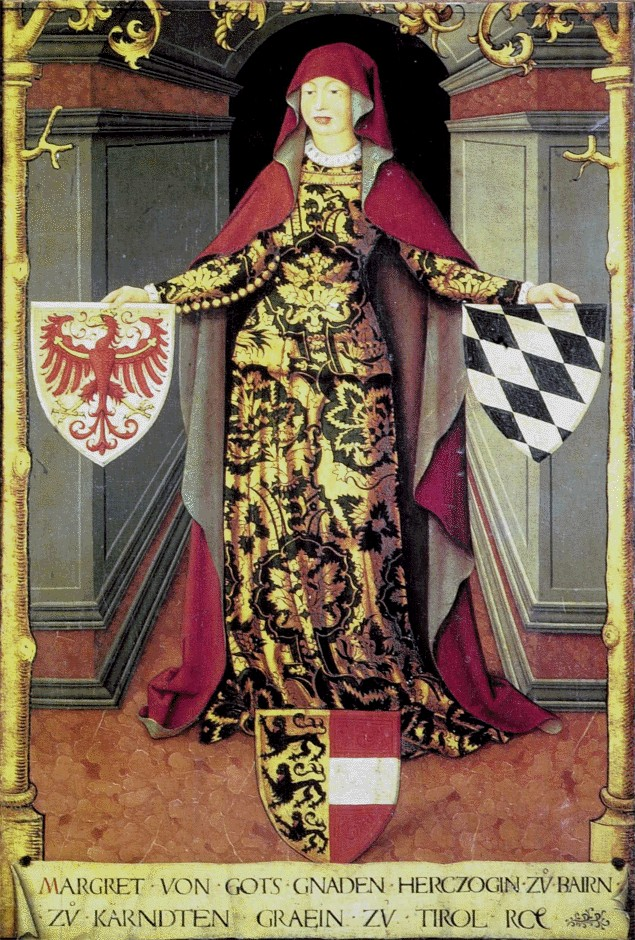
- Portrait of Margaret, Countess of Tyrol, displaying the arms of Tyrol (left), Wittelsbach (right), and Carinthia (centre), c. 1500-1550.

Countess of Tyrol
- Reign: 1335–1363
- Predecessor: Henry II
- Successor: Rudolf the Founder
- Born: 1318
- Died: 3 October 1369; Vienna, Austria
- Burial: Minoritenkirche, Vienna
- Spouse: John Henry, Margrave of Moravia (m. 1330; ann. 1349) Louis V, Duke of Bavaria (m. 1342; died 1361)
- Issue: Meinhard III of Gorizia-Tyrol
- House: House of Gorizia
- Father: Henry of Bohemia
- Mother: Adelaide of Brunswick

Margaret (1318 – 3 October 1369), disparagingly nicknamed Maultasch, was the last Countess of Tyrol from the House of Gorizia (Meinhardiner), and an unsuccessful claimant to the Duchy of Carinthia. Upon her death, Tyrol became united with the Austrian hereditary lands of the Habsburg dynasty.

== Biography ==
=== Descent ===
Margaret was the only surviving daughter of Duke Henry of Carinthia, also landgrave of Carniola, Count of Tyrol and former King of Bohemia, with his second wife, Adelaide of Brunswick, a daughter of the Welf Duke Henry I of Brunswick. As her father's three marriages had produced no male heirs, he reached an agreement with the Wittelsbach Emperor Louis IV in 1330 that enabled Margaret to succeed him in his Carinthian and Tyrolean estates, while Carniola would be handed over to the Habsburgs.

In the ongoing struggle between the rivalling Habsburg, Wittelsbach, and Luxembourg dynasties, Emperor Louis had assured his position by defeating his Habsburg rival Frederick the Fair at the 1322 Battle of Mühldorf – a fact that prompted his former Luxembourg ally, King John of Bohemia, to explore possibilities to increase his own power base. He approached Henry of Carinthia, his former brother-in-law whom he had defeated in the struggle for the Bohemian throne in 1310, and arranged the engagement of his younger son John Henry, brother of the future Emperor Charles IV, to Henry's heiress Margaret in 1327.

John Henry was sent to Tyrol and in 1330, upon approval by Emperor Louis, he and Margaret celebrated their wedding in Innsbruck at the age of eight and twelve, respectively. According to contemporary sources, the children disliked each other from the beginning.

=== Reign ===
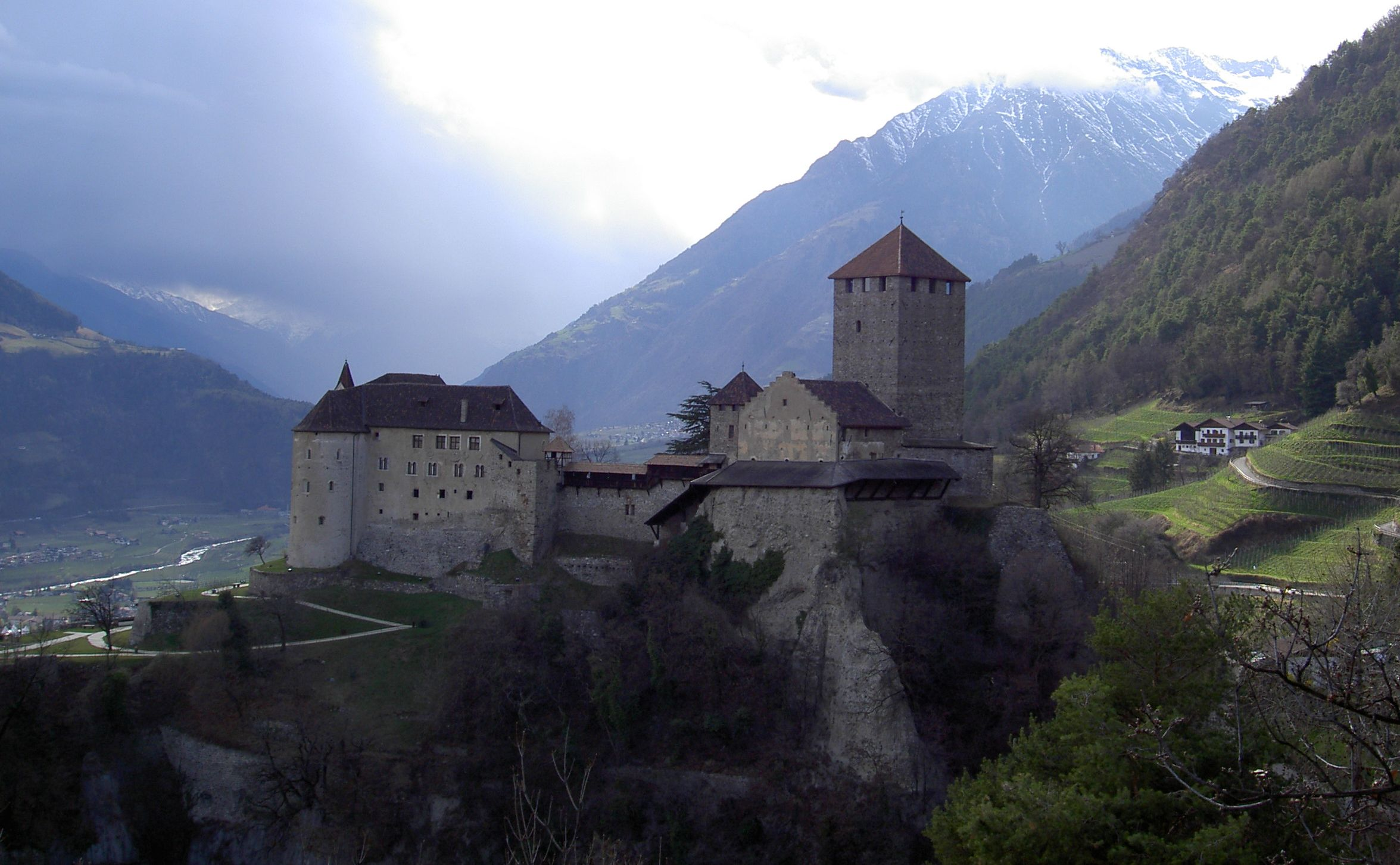
Tyrol Castle

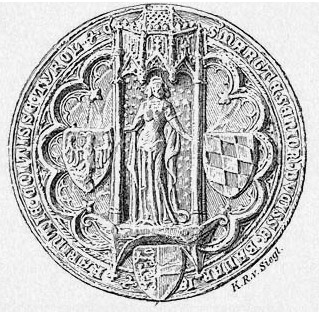
Seal of Margaret, Countess of Tyrol

By the marriage, King John secured access to the Alpine mountain passes to Italy, which in turn drove the Wittelsbach emperor to break the arrangements he had made with Margaret's father. When Henry of Carinthia died in 1335, Louis thus gave Carinthia to the Habsburg Duke Albert II of Austria, who had raised inheritance claims as the eldest son of King Albert I of Germany and Elisabeth of Gorizia-Tyrol, Margaret's paternal aunt. Tyrol, in turn, would be taken by the Wittelsbachs themselves, thus squeezing out Margaret and her Bohemian (Luxembourg) husband entirely. Nevertheless, when the Tyrolean lands were claimed by the Bavarian Wittelsbach dynasty, she cleverly played on her affiliation with the rivalling Luxembourgs. She sent for her husband's capable brother Charles IV who, backed by local nobles, at least enforced Margaret's succession as Countess of Tyrol.

However, the situation again worsened when young John Henry turned out to be a haughty, incompetent co-ruler and philanderer disrespected by the Tyrolean aristocracy. His brother Charles IV temporarily acted as a regent; however, his mediation efforts were rejected, and in 1336/37 he left Tyrol to join his father on a Prussian Crusade. When, on the evening of 1 November 1341, John Henry came home from hunting, Margaret refused her husband admittance to their Tyrol Castle residence. Furious, John Henry moved around the country, but found no shelter in any noble residence. Finally, he was forced to leave the Tyrolean lands and was received as a refugee by the Aquileia patriarch Bertram of St. Genesius.

Margaret again played the rivalling dynasties off against each other and escaped the revenge of the deprived Luxembourgs by turning to the House of Wittelsbach: in the presence of Emperor Louis IV, she married his eldest son Margrave Louis I of Brandenburg on 10 February 1342 in Meran. The fact that she entered the marriage without being granted a divorce from John Henry caused a veritable scandal on the European stage and earned the couple an excommunication by Pope Clement VI. Margrave Louis succeeded in gaining the support of the Tyrolean nobles and took it upon himself to declare Margaret's marriage to John Henry void. The scholars William of Ockham and Marsilius of Padua defended this "first civil marriage" of the Middle Ages, claiming that John Henry had never consummated his matrimony.

Margaret's former brother-in-law Charles IV, who was elected German anti-king in opposition to Emperor Louis in 1346, campaigned in Tyrol the next year and laid siege to Tyrol Castle; however, he had to pull out without success, though not without burning down the cities of Bozen and Meran out of revenge. After the emperor's death in October, Charles was able to consolidate Luxembourg rule and abandoned his hostile attitude. He gave in and dissolved the marriage of his brother with Margaret according to canon law, to obtain papal agreement for John Henry's remarriage to Margaret of Opava, daughter of the Přemyslid Duke Nicholas II in 1349.

Margaret forged a new alliance by the marriage of her son by Louis, Meinhard III, to Margaret of Habsburg, the youngest daughter of the Austrian Duke Albert II. With the assistance of the Habsburgs, the countess and her second husband were finally absolved from excommunication by Pope Innocent VI in 1359.

=== Retirement ===
After the sudden death of her husband Louis in 1361, Margaret's son Meinhard III succeeded his father as Duke of Upper Bavaria and Count of Tyrol. However, Meinhard died less than two years later without heirs and just under a month away from the age of twenty-one. His death precipitated an invasion by his Wittelsbach uncle, Duke Stephen II of Bavaria-Landshut. Stephen, allied with Bernabò Visconti, re-united Landshut with Meinhard's Upper Bavarian lands and also claimed Tyrol. Again facing the threat of losing her patrimony, Margaret was finally induced to contract the County of Tyrol over to her late son's brother-in-law, the Habsburg duke (and self-proclaimed "Archduke") Rudolf IV of Austria, who eventually united it with the Austrian dominions. The conflict over Tyrol was settled by the 1369 Peace of Schärding between Rudolf's brother and successor Duke Albert III of Austria and Duke Stephen II of Bavaria, the financial compensation for which was exigent upon Margaret's death.

Margaret died in exile in Vienna in 1369 and is buried at the Minoritenkirche church.

Margaret's feudal heir would have been her elder cousin, Elizabeth of Carinthia's son, Frederick the Simple, ruler of the island of Sicily, the only descendant of Otto III of Carinthia, the penultimate ruler from the Gorizia-Tyrol dynasty. After his line, the succession would have gone in 1401 to Joanna of Aragon, Countess of Foix, and in 1407 to Yolande of Aragon, Queen of Naples (both daughters of John I, King of Aragon). Only in 1740 would that descent converge with the actual holders of the Tyrol, when Maria Theresa, wife of the Aragonian heir Francis III, Duke of Lorraine, succeeded in Tyrol as well.

== Nicknames ==
In the fierce dispute over her divorce and remarriage, Margaret received the nickname Maultasch (literally "bag mouth", cf. Maultasche, meaning "whore" or "vicious woman") in contemporary ecclesiastical propaganda. The epithet is first documented in a 1366 sequel of the Sächsische Weltchronik (Saxon World Chronicle); she was also called Medusa by the Florence chronicler Filippo Villani and is further known by a variety of nicknames, including Kriemhild, Medusa, Mouthpoke, Pocket-mouth, Satchel-mouth, the Big Mouth, the Mouth Bag, the Pocket-Mouthed, the She-Wolf of the Tyrol, the Ugly Duchess, and With the Pouch Mouth.

Contemporaries, such as the chronicler John of Winterthur, called her exceptionally beautiful; however, with the lack of contemporary portraits, the nickname Maultasch led to the widespread notion of a woman with deformed features. Quentin Matsys's 1513 portrait The Ugly Duchess (which was thought to have been made after a sanguine by Leonardo da Vinci, but it is more likely that the latter is a copy after Matsys') may refer to Margaret, and it was Sir John Tenniel's model for the "Duchess" in his illustrations of Lewis Carroll's Alice's Adventures in Wonderland. In 1816, Jacob Grimm collected the "Legends of Margarete" in his book German sagas, and Lion Feuchtwanger used her story in his 1923 novel The Ugly Duchess. The tale of Margaret's unsuccessful siege of Carinthian Hochosterwitz Castle and its shrewd garrison was popularized by the psychologist Paul Watzlawick.

== Bibliography ==
- Baum, Wilhelm (1994). Margarete Maultasch. Erbin zwischen den Mächten. Graz-Wien-Cologne.

Margaret, Countess of Tyrol House of Gorizia Born: 1318 Died: 3 October 1369
Regnal titles
Preceded by Henry II	Countess of Tyrol; 1335–1363 with John Henry (1335–1341); Louis (1341–1361); Meinhard III (1361–1363)	Succeeded by Rudolf the Founder
