= Stephen II of Bavaria =

Duke of Bavaria from 1347 to 1375

Stephan II
- Duke of Bavaria
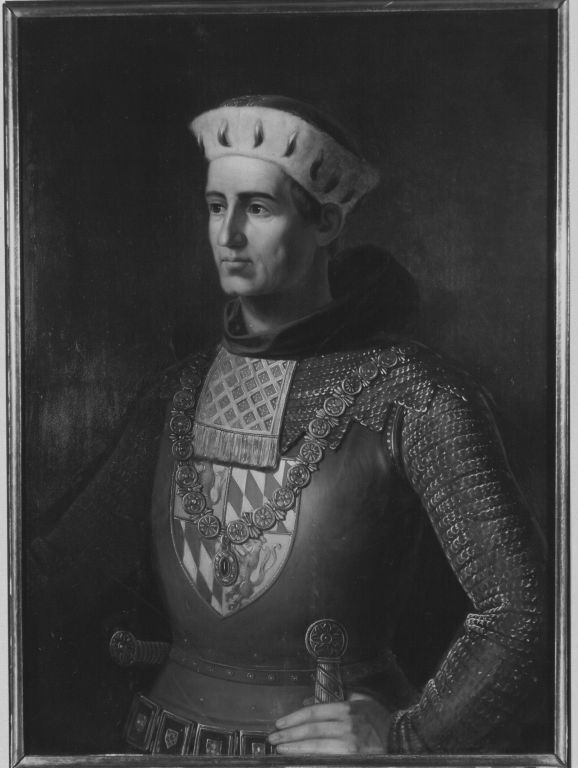
- Stephen II, Duke of Bavaria (painting by Julius Zimmermann, c. 1851)
- Born: 1319
- Died: 13 May 1375 (aged 55–56); Landshut or Munich
- Spouses: Elisabeth of Sicily; Margarete of Nuremberg
- Issue: Stephen III, Duke of Bavaria; Frederick, Duke of Bavaria; John II, Duke of Bavaria; Agnes, Queen of Cyprus
- House: Wittelsbach
- Father: Louis IV, Holy Roman Emperor
- Mother: Beatrix of Świdnica

Stephen II (1319 – 13 May 1375, Landshut; German: Stephan) was Duke of Bavaria from 1347 until his death. He was the second son of Emperor Louis IV the Bavarian and his first wife Beatrice of Silesia and a member of the Wittelsbach dynasty.

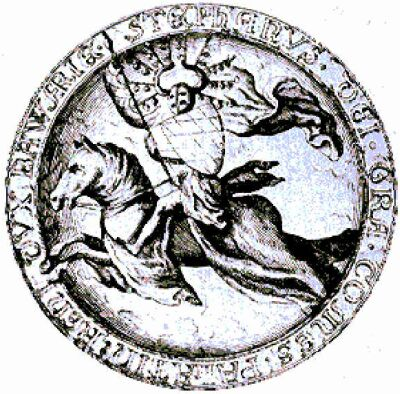
Seal of Stephen II.

== Biography ==
During the reign of Emperor Louis IV his son Stephen served as vogt of Swabia and Alsace. The Emperor had acquired Brandenburg, Tyrol, Holland and Hainaut for his House but he had also released the Upper Palatinate for the Palatinate branch of the Wittelsbach in 1329. When his father died in 1347, Stephen succeeded him as Duke of Bavaria and Count of Holland and Hainaut together with his five brothers. Louis IV had reunited Bavaria in 1340 but in 1349 the country was divided for the emperor's sons again into Upper Bavaria, Lower Bavaria-Landshut and Bavaria-Straubing. Stephen II ruled from 1349 to 1353 together with his brothers William I and Albert I in Holland and Lower Bavaria-Landshut, since 1353 only in Lower Bavaria-Landshut.

After the temporary reconciliation of the Wittelsbach with Charles IV, Holy Roman Emperor, who had finally confirmed all Wittelsbach possessions, Stephen joined Charles' expedition to Italy in 1354. But soon the Golden Bull of 1356 caused a new conflict since only the Palatinate branch of the Wittelsbach and his brother Louis VI the Roman as margrave of Brandenburg were invested with the electoral dignity. Stephen II was the last son of Emperor Louis IV who was in 1362 absolved from excommunication.

When Duke Meinhard, the son of his older brother Louis V the Brandenburger died in 1363, Stephen II succeeded also in Upper Bavaria and invaded Tyrol. To strengthen his position against Rudolf IV, Duke of Austria he confederated with Bernabò Visconti. Stephen finally renounced Tyrol to the Habsburgs with the Peace of Schärding for a huge financial compensation after the death of Margarete Maultasch in 1369.

His conflict with his brother Louis VI the Roman on the Bavarian heritage of Meinhard finally caused also the loss of Brandenburg by the Wittelsbach dynasty since Louis then made Charles IV his contracted heir. However, Stephen accepted his brother Otto, the last Wittelsbach regent of Brandenburg, as his nominal co-regent when he returned to Bavaria in 1373. Due to the loss of Brandenburg the Bavarian dukes received a financial compensation one more time. Stephen was succeeded by his three sons.

He is buried in the Frauenkirche in Munich.

== Family and children ==
Stephen was married twice. First, 27 June 1328 to Elisabetta of Sicily, daughter of King Frederick III of Sicily and Eleanor of Anjou. Second, he was married 14 February 1359 to Margarete of Nuremberg, daughter of John II of Nuremberg and Elisabeth of Henneberg. All his children were from his first marriage, including three sons, who finally divided Bavaria among themselves in 1392 and one daughter:

1. Stephen III of Bavaria-Ingolstadt (1337–September 26, 1413, Niederschönfeld).
2. Frederick of Bavaria-Landshut (1339–December 4, 1393, Budweis).
3. John II of Bavaria-Munich (1341–1397), married Katherina of Gorz
4. Agnes (b. 1338), married c. 1356 King James I of Cyprus.

Two of Stephen's sons (Stephen III and Frederick) and one grandson (John's son Ernest) were married to daughters of his ally Bernabò Visconti.

In 1447 Bavaria-Ingolstadt was united with Bavaria-Landshut, which was seized by Bavaria-Munich in 1503.

== Sources ==
- Thomas, Andrew L. (2010). A House Divided: Wittelsbach Confessional Court Cultures in the Holy Roman Empire, c.1550-1650. Brill.

Stephen II of Bavaria House of Wittelsbach Born: 1319 Died: 13 May 1375
Regnal titles
| Preceded by Louis IV | Duke of Bavaria; 1347–49 with Louis V, Louis VI, William I, Albert I and Otto V | Partitioned into Upper and Lower Bavaria |
| Created from Bavaria | Duke of Lower Bavaria; 1349–53 with William I and Albert I | Partitioned into Bavaria-Landshut and Bavaria-Straubing |
| Created from Lower Bavaria | Duke of Bavaria-Landshut; 1353–75 | Succeeded by John II, Frederick and Stephen III |
| Preceded by Meinhard | Duke of Upper Bavaria; 1363 | Reunion with Bavaria-Landshut |
