= Louis V of Bavaria =

Duke of Bavaria from 1347 to 1361

Louis V
- Duke of Bavaria
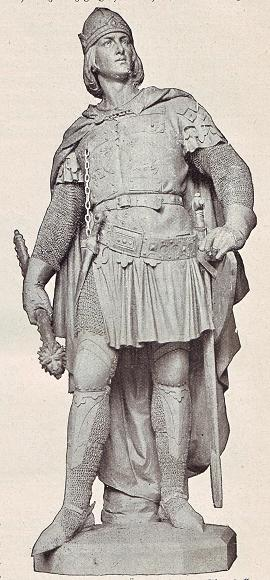
- Born: May 1315
- Died: 18 September 1361; Zorneding, Bavaria
- Spouse: Margaret of Denmark; Margaret, Countess of Tyrol
- Issue: Hermann of Bavaria; Meinhard III of Gorizia-Tyrol
- House: Wittelsbach
- Father: Louis IV, Holy Roman Emperor
- Mother: Beatrix of Świdnica

Louis V, called the Brandenburger (May 1315 – 18 September 1361), a member of the House of Wittelsbach, ruled as Margrave of Brandenburg from 1323 to 1351 and as Duke of Bavaria from 1347 until his death. From 1342 he also was co-ruling Count of Tyrol by his marriage with the Meinhardiner countess Margaret.

== Family history ==
Louis V was the eldest son of King Louis IV of Germany and his first wife, Beatrice of Świdnica. His father, Duke of Bavaria since 1294, had been elected king in 1314, rivalled by the Habsburg anti-king Frederick the Fair. He had to defend his rights in a lengthy throne quarrel, finally defeated Frederick's forces in the 1322 Battle of Mühldorf, and in 1328 received the Imperial crown; though not by the pope but by the "Roman people" led by Sciarra Colonna.

== Margrave of Brandenburg ==
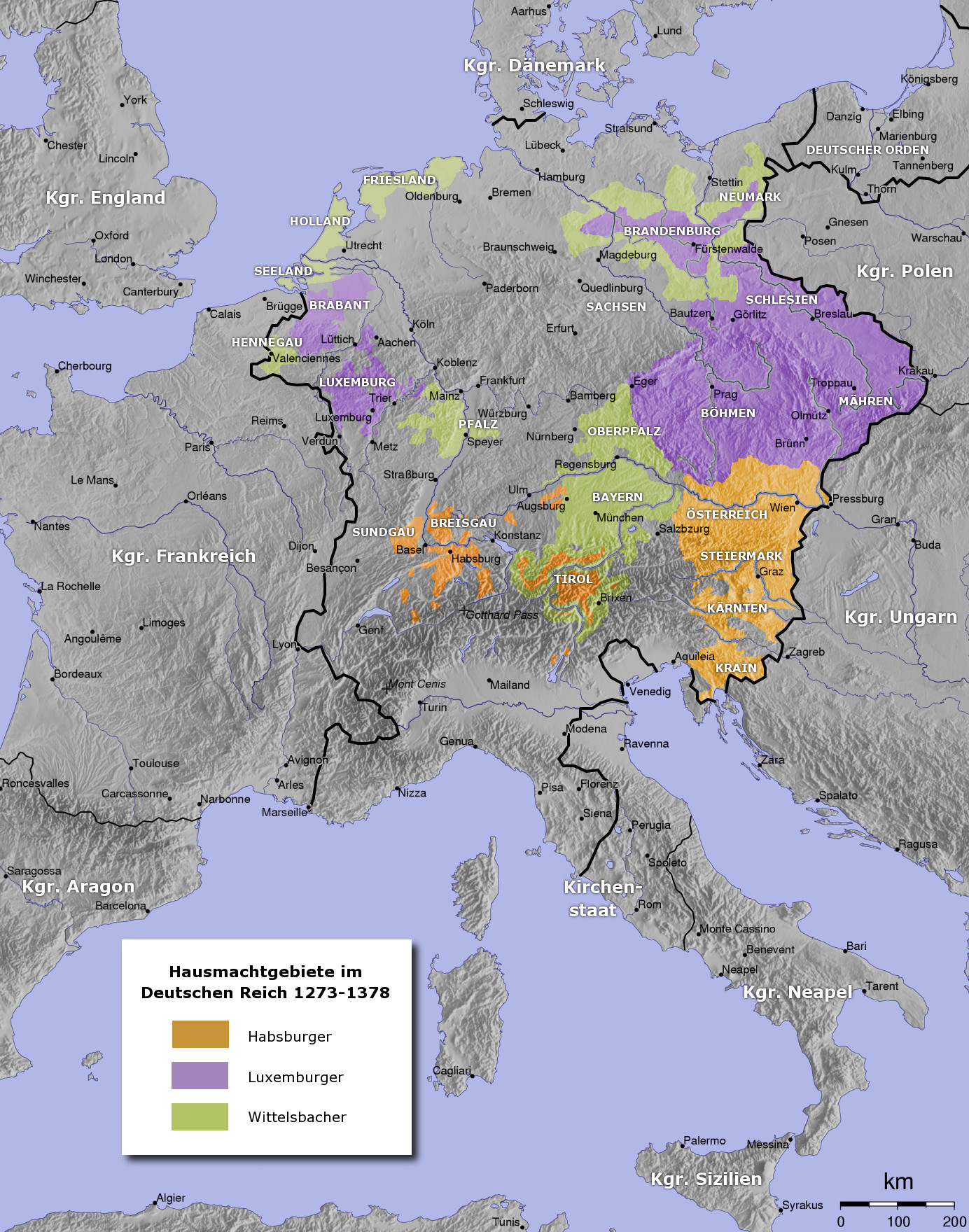
Holy Roman Empire 1273-1378: Habsburg, Luxembourg, and Wittelsbach territories

Upon his victory at Mühldorf, Louis IV took the occasion to seize the princeless Margraviate of Brandenburg, where the last Ascanian ruler Henry the Child had died without heirs in 1320. Ignoring the claims raised by Henry's Ascanian relative Duke Rudolf I of Saxe-Wittenberg, a supporter of his Habsburg rival anyway, he appointed his eldest son, the future Louis V, margrave in 1323. Still a minor, he remained under tutelage of Count Berthold VII of Henneberg, who acted as a Brandenburg regent. Duke Rudolf I in late 1324 renounced the Brandenburg estates in turn for a compensation.

To further strengthen the rule of the Wittelsbach dynasty in Northern Germany, Margrave Louis was married to Margaret (1305–1340), the eldest daughter of King Christopher II of Denmark, in 1324. Nevertheless, the Wittelsbach rule in Brandenburg never earned much popular support. As a consequence of the murder of Provost Nikolaus von Bernau by Berlin and Cölln citizens in 1325, the twin-town was punished with a papal interdict. Subsequently, the public unrest led to a resurgence of the centuries-long Brandenburg–Pomeranian conflict from 1328 onwards. The Pomeranian dukes had to withdraw from the Uckermark region after a series of battles throughout the late 1320s and early 1330s. In 1330, they took their duchy as a papal fief to circumvent the Brandenburg claims. In 1336, Louis joined the Teutonic Knights on a crusade in Lithuania, indirectly causing the mass suicide of 4,000 Lithuanians at Pilėnai. In 1338, they finally concluded a peace with the Wittelsbach margrave, who renounced his claims on overlordship but maintained the right of succession.

Having received the Brandenburg princely territory as a fiefdom, Louis contributed to the 1338 Declaration at Rhense, emphasizing his father's rights against the interference by Pope Benedict XII. In 1340, he and Count John III of Holstein backed Valdemar IV, brother of Louis' wife Margaret, to succeed to the Danish throne. The House of Wittelsbach maintained good relations to the Danish court, even after Margaret's death in the same year.

From 1342 onwards, Margrave Louis mainly stayed in Bavaria and Tyrol. On 10 February 1342, he married the Tyrolean countess Margaret (Margarethe Maultasch), in order to acquire her estates for the Wittelsbach family; nevertheless, she was not yet divorced from her previous husband, the Luxembourg prince John Henry. The year before Margaret had expelled her husband from Tyrol. John Henry was a son of King John I of Bohemia, who had deposed Margaret's father, Henry of Gorizia-Tyrol as King of Bohemia in 1310. While Emperor Louis IV had the scholars William of Ockham and Marsilius of Padua defend this first "civil marriage" of the Middle Ages, Pope Clement VI, however, immediately excommunicated the couple and the scandal was known across Europe. Though Tyrol was punished with a papal interdict, and the Bishops of Brixen and Trent strongly objected to Louis' rule, the Wittelsbachs were able to gain the support of the local nobles by granting them numerous privileges.

== Duke of Bavaria ==
When his father died in October 1347, Louis succeeded him as Duke of Bavaria as well as Count of Holland, Zeeland and Hainaut, together with his five brothers. On 12 September 1349, Bavaria and the Wittelsbach possessions in the Low Countries were partitioned: Margrave Louis and his younger brothers Louis VI the Roman and Otto V the Bavarian received Upper Bavaria; their brothers Stephen II, William I and Albert I received Lower Bavaria, Holland and Hainaut.

Still banned, Margrave Louis could not apply for the German crown and his party tried to move the Wettin margrave Frederick II of Meissen to the acceptance of the royal title, however, he mistrusted the inconstancy of his voters and rejected the request. Louis then negotiated with his father's ally King Edward III of England to compete against the new Luxembourg king Charles IV, the elder brother of Margaret's husband John Henry. Edward was indeed elected on 10 January 1348 at Lahnstein, but resigned just four months later. Finally, the Wittelsbach party elected Count Günther von Schwarzburg as anti-king in 1349. Louis V successfully resisted Charles IV even though Günther von Schwarzburg's kingship failed. He managed to keep all possessions for the Wittelsbach dynasty until his death.

First Louis successfully repulsed an attack of Charles IV against Tyrol in 1347. In alliance with Denmark and Pomerania, he then drove back a revolt in 1348 - 1350 caused by the conman "False Waldemar," an imposter who pretended to be Waldemar, Margrave of Brandenburg, claiming he had been declared dead erroneously while on a pilgrimage to the Holy Land. Probably a strawman of the Luxembourg emperor Charles IV, and/or the Anhalt and Saxon branches of the House of Ascania, he was invested with the margraviate between 1348 and 1350, and took on his position as a margrave with military support of Charles IV and the Ascanians. The Wittelsbachs were expelled from most of Brandenburg and only controlled the Neumark territory and some adjacent areas. Together with Denmark, the Pomeranian dukes sided with the Wittelsbachs, and the alliance had gained already ground in 1350 when the conflict ended With the Treaty of Bautzen (16 February): Louis finally came to terms with Charles IV, who re-invested the House of Wittelsbach with Brandenburg. The civil war caused a huge devastation in Brandenburg.

Louis released Brandenburg in December 1351 to his brothers Louis VI and Otto V, in exchange for the sole rule of Upper Bavaria. Louis then combined the administration of Upper Bavaria and Tyrol, residing both in Munich and Meran. In 1349 and 1352 he issued two decrees to relieve the consequences of the plague and enabled Jews to re-settle in the Upper Bavarian lands.

Louis VI the Roman, Brandeburg margrave between 1351 and 1365, had to re-establish the Wittelsbach rule against the opposition of the Ascanians, which he accomplished by 1355. During this process, the Brandenburg-Pomeranian border in the Uckermark was finally settled in 1354. With the Golden Bull of 1356, only the Palatinate branch of the Wittelsbach family and Louis VI the Roman as Margrave of Brandenburg were invested with the electoral dignity, which caused a new conflict between Louis V and Charles IV.

Duke Louis V maintained good relations with his Habsburg relatives and in 1352 helped arbitrate conflicts of Duke Albert II of Austria with the Swiss Confederacy. When Louis' son Meinhard III married Margaret of Austria, the daughter of Duke Albert II, in September 1359, he and his consort were absolved from their excommunication with the support of the Habsburg family.

Louis suddenly died in September 1361 in Zorneding near Munich during a ride from Tyrol to Munich. He was succeeded by his son Meinhard III who died two years later, whereafter his mother Margaret bequeathed her Tyrolean estates to the Habsburg duke Rudolf IV of Austria. Louis V is buried in the Munich Frauenkirche.

== Family and children ==
Louis was married two times.

1. 1324: Margrete of Denmark (c. 1305 – 1340), daughter of King Christopher II of Denmark
  1. Beatrix of Bavaria (died 1359), Queen consort of King Erik Magnusson of Sweden (ruled as co-king from 1356 to 1359)
2. 1342: Margaret, Countess of Tyrol (1318–1369), daughter-in-law of John of Luxembourg, king of Bohemia, wife of John Henry of Luxembourg (divorced in 1349)
  1. Hermann of Bavaria (1343–1360)
  2. Meinhard III (1344–1363), married 1359 with Margarete of Habsburg (1346–1366), daughter of Duke Albert II of Austria
  3. daughter
  4. daughter

== Map ==
- The Holy Roman Empire 1347

== Sources ==
- Heitz, Gerhard; Rischer, Henning (1995). Geschichte in Daten. Mecklenburg-Vorpommern (in German). Münster-Berlin: Koehler&Amelang. ISBN 3-7338-0195-4.
- Materna, Ingo; Ribbe, Wolfgang; Adamy, Kurt (1995). Brandenburgische Geschichte (in German). Akademie Verlag. ISBN 3-05-002508-5.
- Mollat, Guillaume (1965). The Popes at Avignon, 1305-1378. Harper & Rowe.

Louis the Brandenburger House of Wittelsbach Born: 1315 Died: 1361
Vacant Escheated to King Louis IV of Germany Title last held by Henry II	Margrave of Brandenburg; 1323–1351	Succeeded by Louis II
Preceded by Louis IV	Duke of Bavaria; 1347–1349 with Stephen II, Louis VI, William I, Albert I and Otto V	Partitioning
New title	Duke of Upper Bavaria; 1349–1361 with Louis VI and Otto V (1349–1351)	Succeeded by Meinhard (III)
Preceded by Margaret	Count of Tyrol; 1342–1361 with Margaret	Succeeded by Meinhard (III)
