= False Waldemar =

Holy Roman impostor

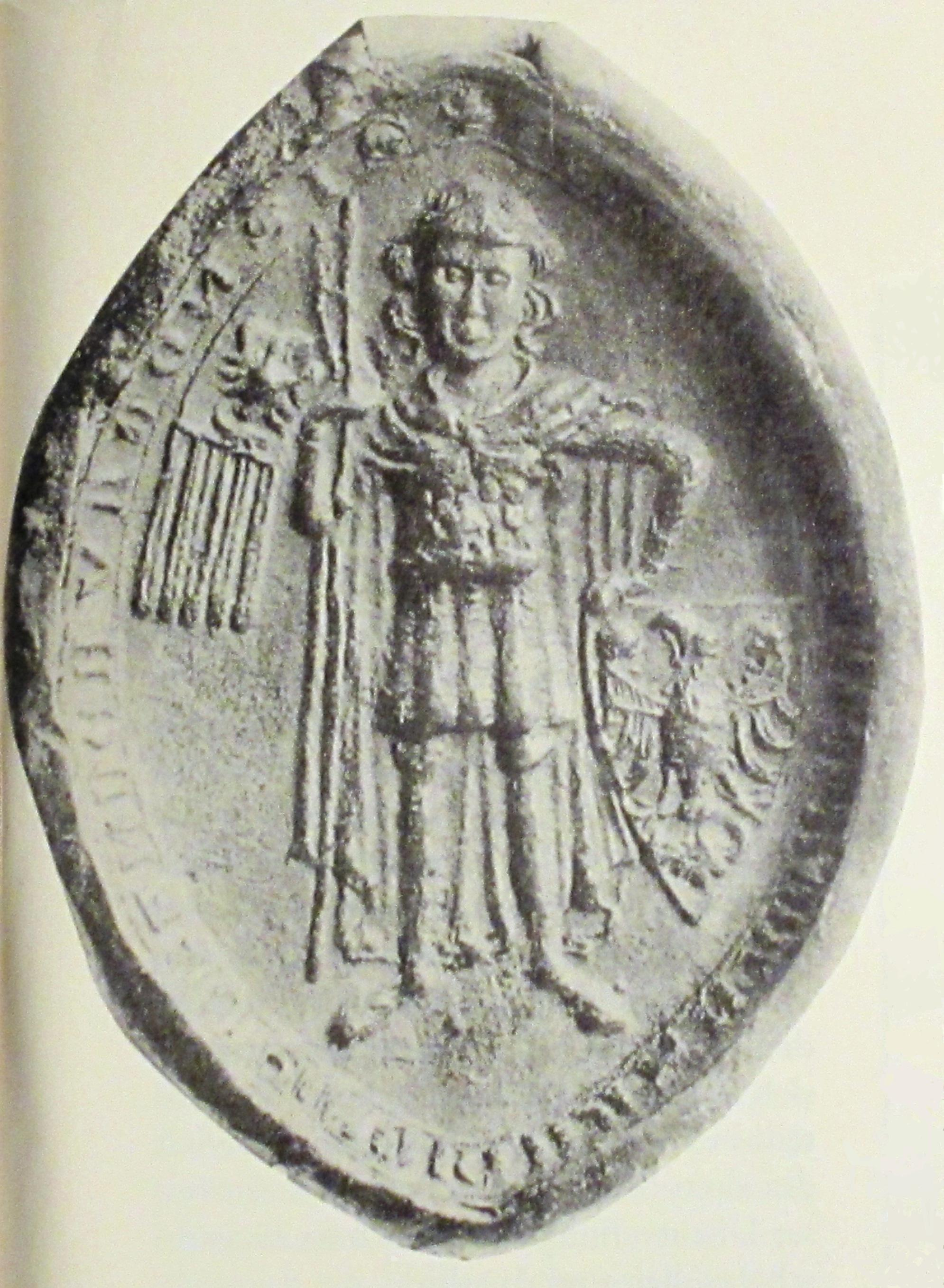
False Waldemar

The False Waldemar (died 1356), also known as the Wrong Waldemar, was an impostor who from 1348 to 1350 was invested with the Margraviate of Brandenburg by Charles IV.

== Life ==
The legitimate Waldemar, Margrave of Brandenburg-Stendal was buried in 1319. After this supposed extinction of the Brandenburg House of Ascania, the Wittelsbach Emperor Louis the Bavarian awarded the March of Brandenburg to his own son Louis in 1320. Twenty-eight years later, in the summer of 1348 (or, according to Carlyle, twenty-five years in 1345) an elderly man claiming to be a returning pilgrim presenting himself to the Archbishop of Magdeburg Otto as the old Brandenburg Margrave Waldemar. He claimed the burial of 1319 had been staged, and that he had in the meantime been on a pilgrimage to the Holy Land. This was allegedly Jacob Roebuck or Rehbuck, possibly a journeyman miller. Thomas Carlyle wrote that he might have been in the real Waldemar's employ, where he could have learned his master's manners. This and other rumors are not more than speculation by contemporaries and chroniclers. His true identity is still unknown.

The False Waldemar quickly gained adherents, especially among the rivals of the Wittelsbach royals. He posed as a representative of the ancestral Ascanian princely house, which he promised to help against the foreign and unpopular Bavaria. Within weeks the False Waldemar was able to convince a large portion of the March. Emperor Charles IV, on the defensive, invested the Wrong Waldemar on 2 October 1348 with the Margraviate of Brandenburg. Only a few towns held on to the Wittelsbach, including Treuenbrietzen, which during this period gained its prefix treu- meaning 'faithful'.

Two years later, in April 1350, the False Waldemar was exposed as a cheat. Charles deposed him as because of an agreement with the Wittelsbach (Treaty of Eltville). From this time on, Waldemar held an Ascanian court at Anhalt-Dessau, where he retained courtly honor all his life, before he died in 1356 of natural causes.

== In literature ==
Thomas Carlyle in his History of Friedrich II of Prussia called False Waldemar "the wickedest and worst trouble of their [Ascanian] raising", "a new goblin, where already there were plenty, in the dance round poor Ludwig [Louis the Bavarian]". Willibald Alexis wrote his novel Der falsche Woldemar (The False Woldemar) in 1842. A more recent novel is Der letzte Askanier (The Last of Ascanians) by Horst Bosetzky (1997), which explores the events around the Wrong Waldemar, with the author adding his own theory as to the identity of the alleged Ascanian.
