= Meinhard, Duke of Upper Bavaria =

Meinhard III
- Count of Tyrol
- Count: 1361–1363
- Predecessor: Louis
- Successor: Rudolf the Founder
- Born: 9 February 1344; Landshut, Duchy of Bavaria
- Died: 13 January 1363 (aged 18); Tirol Castle, County of Tyrol
- Noble family: House of Wittelsbach
- Spouse: Margaret of Austria
- Father: Louis V, Duke of Bavaria
- Mother: Margaret, Countess of Tyrol

Meinhard (9 February 1344 – 13 January 1363), a member of the House of Wittelsbach, was duke of Upper Bavaria and count of Tyrol (as Meinhard III) from 1361 until his death. He was the son of Duke Louis V of Bavaria with Countess Margaret of Tyrol and as such also the last descendant of the Tyrolean branch of the House of Gorizia.

== Biography ==
Meinhard was born in Landshut during the reign of his Wittelsbach grandfather, Emperor Louis IV, who had prevailed against his Habsburg rival Frederick the Fair. His father Louis V, the eldest son of the emperor, in 1323 was enfeoffed with the Margraviate of Brandenburg upon the extinction of the Ascanian margraves. He did however concentrate on his Bavarian heritage and in 1342 married Countess Margaret of Tyrol, whose first matrimony with John Henry of Luxembourg was not yet divorced. This marriage earned the couple not only the enmity of the House of Luxembourg, but also the excommunication by Pope Clement VI. When Emperor Louis IV died in 1347, his son was not able to obtain the Imperial Crown, which passed from the Wittelsbach dynasty to the Luxembourg scion Charles IV.

In the course of a rapprochement between the Wittelsbach and Habsburg families, Louis' son Meinhard was raised at the Habsburg court in Vienna and when he came of age, he was married to Margaret of Austria (1346–1366) on June 1358 in Passau. Margaret was a daughter of his father's ally, the Habsburg duke Albert II of Austria, and on this occasion his parents were absolved from the excommunication. After the sudden death of Louis V in 1361, his seventeen-year-old son ascended to rule in Upper Bavaria and in the County of Tyrol, in which he was strongly influenced by the Bavarian nobility. Meinhard also had to fend off attacks by his Wittelsbach uncle Duke Stephen II of Bavaria-Landshut and his Palatinate cousins. He fled to the court of the Prince-Bishop of Eichstätt, was temporarily arrested in Munich and finally retired to the Tyrolean home lands of his mother, possibly with the help of the Habsburg duke Rudolf IV of Austria.

Meinhard III died at Tirol Castle near Meran in 1363. His early death induced his mother Margaret to deny the inheritance claims raised by Count Meinhard VI of Gorizia and the House of Wittelsbach, when she ceded Tyrol to Duke Rudolf IV of Austria. Therefore, Meinhard's uncle Stephen II of Bavaria-Landshut, who had succeeded him in Upper Bavaria, invaded Tyrol but finally released the county in 1369, in return for a huge financial compensation. The unification of Tyrol with Austria was completed.

Meinhard, Duke of Upper Bavaria House of Wittelsbach Born: 1344 Died: 1363
Regnal titles
Preceded by Louis and Margaret	Count of Tyrol; 1361–1363	Succeeded by Rudolf
Preceded by Louis V	Duke of Upper Bavaria; 1361–1363	Succeeded by Stephen II
