= Bavarian War (1420–1422) =

15th-century conflict in Bavaria

Date	1420–1422
Location	Bavaria
Result	Victory of Bavaria-Munich

Belligerents
Bavaria-Ingolstadt	Bavaria-Landshut; Bavaria-Munich

Commanders and leaders
Louis VII the Bearded	Henry XVI; Ernest; William III

The Bavarian War from 1420 to 1422, also known as the Great War of the Lords, was a conflict between Louis VII the Bearded of Bayern-Ingolstadt and Henry XVI of Bavaria-Landshut. The conflict overshadowed Louis VII's reign, which lasted more than thirty years.

== Background and history ==
Henry XVI already had a dispute with Louis VII's father Stephen III. On 17 April 1414, Henry and other enemies of Louis VII founded the Parakeet Society. On 8 July 1415, the society was changed into the League of Constance, an alliance for mutual defense against Louis VII. In 1417 in Constance, Louis insulted Henry by calling him "the son of a cook". When Louis then accused Henry of having shed human blood, Henry and fifteen of his followers physically attacked Louis and injured him severely. After this attack, Louis described Henry as a pluethunt ("blood hound"), which did little to defuse the conflict.

Henry XVI evaded punishment for the attack on Louis VII only through the intercession of Frederick of Brandenburg and his cousins Dukes Ernest and William III in Munich and especially by paying 6000 guilders to King Sigismund. Henry XVI wanted revenge.

The conflict escalated into a war when an army from Bavaria-Ingolstadt burned down the castle of the Burgrave of Nuremberg. John III, who had succeeded his brother William II as Duke of Bavaria-Straubing in 1418, remained neutral.

== Destruction ==
The village of Neidertshofen near Gaimersheim was probably destroyed during the Bavarian War. The village of Dettenheim was also burnt down. Among the ruined castles were the seat of the burgraves of Nuremberg, the castle of the Bavarian nobleman Kaspar Törring, Guttenberg Castle at Kraiburg am Inn in Upper Bavaria and Betzenstein Castle (at Betzenstein).

== End of the war ==
The war ended when Bavaria-Ingolstadt was defeated in the Battle of Alling. At the instigation of King Sigismund, who intended to focus his forces on the Hussite Wars, a four-year ceasefire between the warring parties was concluded on 2 October 1422 in Regensburg under the mediation of John II of Heideck, the bishop of Eichstätt. The Duchy of Bavaria-Ingolstadt would be governed by a royal Landeshauptmann, while Louis VII followed them to his court in the Kingdom of Hungary. Henry XVI was sent to the Grand Duchy of Lithuania to support the Teutonic Knights. Louis VII sued Henry XVI for the murder attempt at Constance and the destruction of Kaspar Törring's castle.

== References and sources ==
- Bernhard Glasauer (2009), "Herzog Heinrich XVI. (1393–1450) der Reiche von Bayern-Landshut. Territorialpolitik zwischen Dynastie und Reich", Münchner Beiträge zur Geschichtswissenschaft (PhD thesis) (1st ed.), München: Herbert Utz Verlag, pp. 159–194, ISBN 978-3-8316-0899-7
- Matthias von Lexer: Johannes Turmair's genannt Aventinus bayerische Chronik, Verlag für Kunstreproduktionen Chr. Schmidt, Neustadt an der Aisch, 1996, ISBN 3-89557-023-0
