= Bavarians =

Ethnographic group of Germans

Boarn (Bavarian) Bayern (German)
- Flag of Bavaria

Total population
- c. 15 million

Languages
- Native and historic Bavarian; Predominant; German

Religion
- Christianity (Catholic Church with a Protestant minority)

Related ethnic groups
- Other Germanic peoples (especially Slavs, Celts, Hungarians, Other Germans)

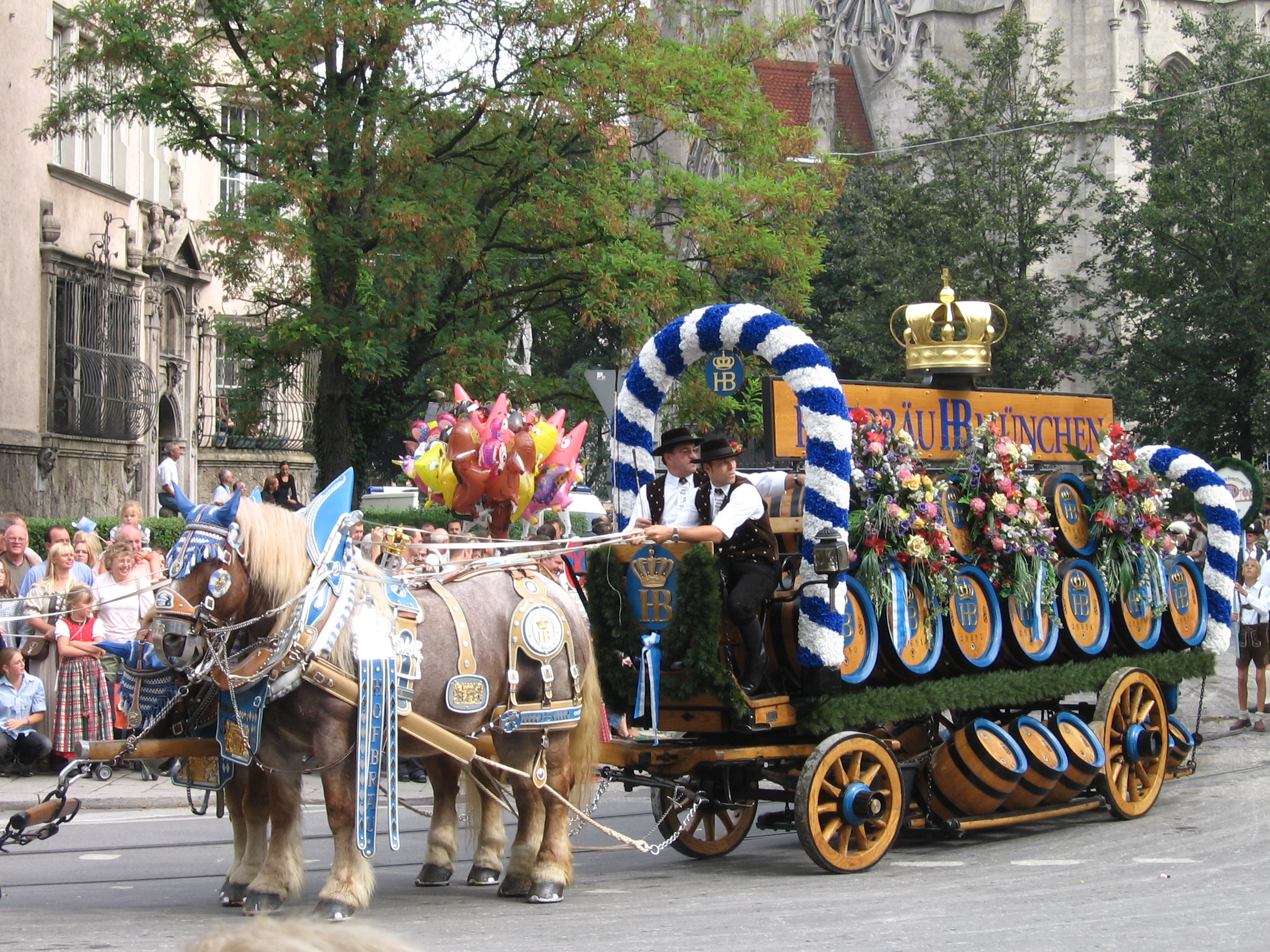
The Oktoberfest in Munich, the most widely known festival of Bavarian culture, held since 1810 (2006 photograph)

Bavarians (Note: Bavarian: Boarn; Standard German: Bayern) are an ethnographic group of Germans native to Bavaria, a state in Germany. The group's dialect or language is known as Bavarian, native to Altbayern ("Old Bavaria"), roughly the territory of the historic Electorate of Bavaria in the 17th century.

Like the neighboring Austrians, Bavarians are traditionally Catholic. In much of Altbayern, membership in the Catholic Church remains above 70%, and the center-right Christian Social Union in Bavaria (successor of the Bavarian People's Party of 1919–1933) has traditionally been the strongest party in the Landtag, and also the party of all minister-presidents of Bavaria since 1946, with the single exception of Wilhelm Hoegner, 1954–1957.

== Areal and dialectal subdivision ==
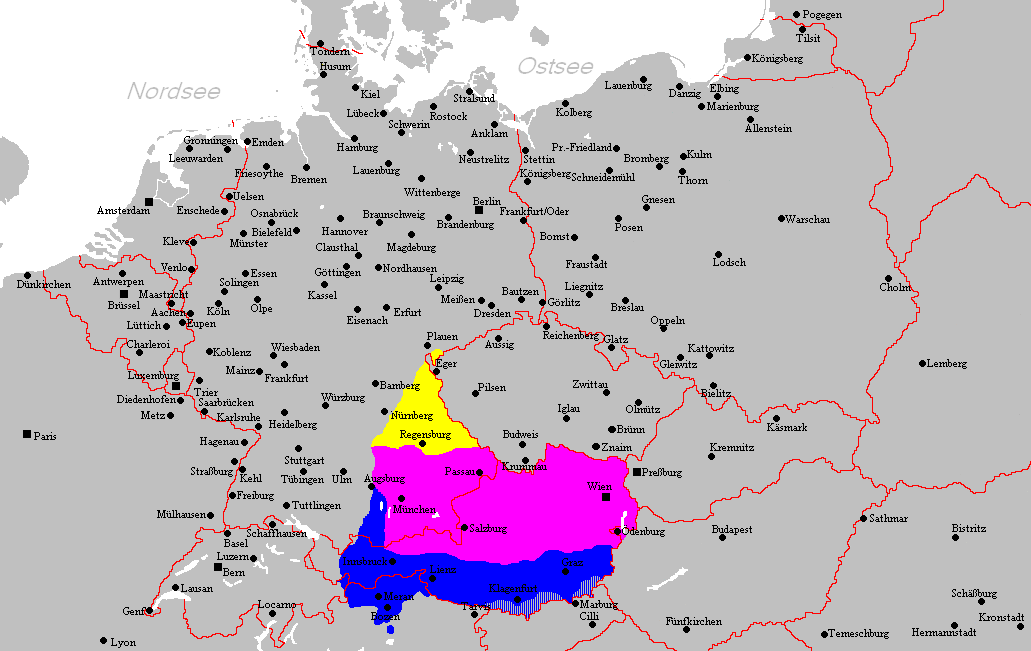
Bavarian (Austro-Bavarian) speaking areas

There is no linguistic distinction between Bavarians and Austrians. The territory of Bavaria has changed significantly over German history; in the 19th century the Kingdom of Bavaria acquired substantial territories of Franconia and Swabia, while having to return territories to Austria who had become Bavarian only a few years earlier. Thus, only three of the seven administrative regions of the state of Bavaria are culturally Bavarian: Upper Bavaria (Oberbayern), Lower Bavaria (Niederbayern) and the Upper Palatinate (Oberpfalz), to the exclusion of Bavarian Franconia (historically inhabited by Franks) and Bavarian Swabia (inhabited by Swabians).

The Bavarian language is divided into three main dialects:

- Upper Palatinian (Oberpfälzisch) is spoken in northern Bavaria (Bohemian Forest, Regensburg).
- Danube Bavarian (Donaubairisch) is spoken in central and south-eastern Bavaria and in Central and Lower Austria (Munich, Salzburg, Vienna).
- Alpine Bavarian is spoken in south-western Bavaria, in southern Austria (Tyrol, Carinthia, Styria) and in South Tyrol.

== History ==
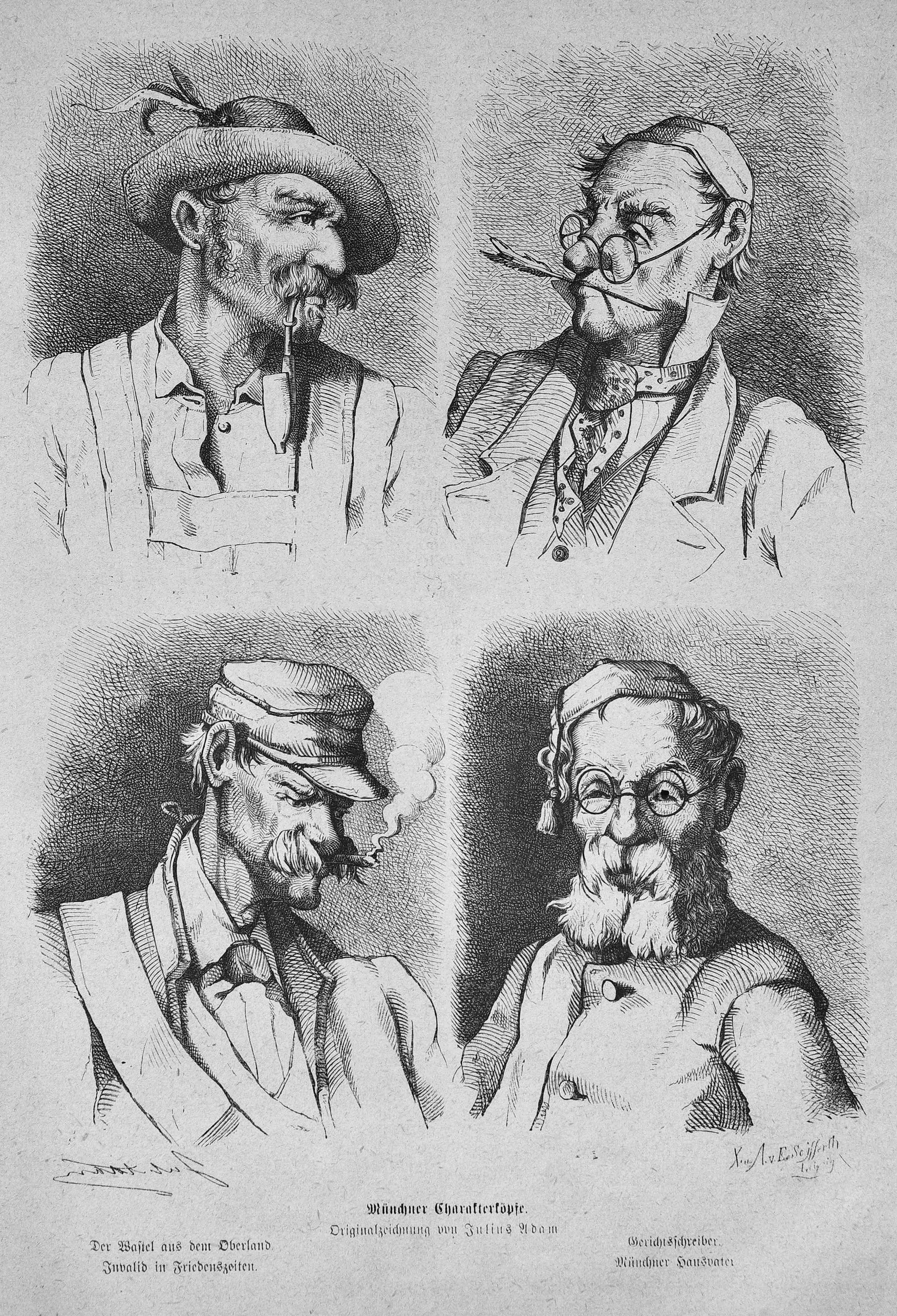
Caricature of four "Munich types" (Münchner Charakterköpfe): Highlander (Der Wastl aus dem Oberland "Wastl from the Oberland"), clerk (Gerichtsschreiber "court secretary"), shirker (Invalid in Friedenszeiten "peacetime-invalid"), petty bourgeois (Münchner Hausvater "Munich pater familias"), Julius Adam, Die Gartenlaube (1875).

=== Origins ===
The Baiuvarii were the early Bavarians, who are known from records starting in the 6th century. Their name indicates a connection to the Bohemian Forest area, which had been the territory of the Boii during antiquity, although the nature of this connection is uncertain. The name is Latinized from the ethnonym *Bajōwarjōz, meaning "citizens of Bohemia" from Proto-Germanic *Bajōhaimaz (Boiohaemum, Bohemia), meaning "Boii home", which was a term already mentioned by Tacitus in his Germania at the end of the 1st century AD, by which time parts of the Celtic Boii had already left the area, leaving it to be dominated by Suevic Germanic groups in close contact with the Romans, such as the Marcomanni in what is now the Czech Republic, and their neighbours the Hermunduri and Varisci in what is now northern Bavaria. On the southern side of the river Danube were the Vindelici in the Roman-controlled province of Raetia.

Bavarians are first mentioned in the mid-6th century, in the foothills north of the Alps, on both sides of the Danube. It is difficult to distinguish the mobile and mixing groups of the Danube in this period archaeologically. The timing comes after the period when the neighbouring Alamanni (to the west) and Thuringians (to the north) had come under Frankish hegemony, and in Italy the kingdoms of Theoderic and Odoacer had come to an end, creating a new power vacuum in the Alpine region. They seem to have been closely related to the Lombards who were developing as a force to the east of them. Their legal system shows heavy Roman influence, and their unification appears to have been under a Duke installed by the Franks (Old Bavarian law codes refer to five main lineages).

The Danubian frontier between the Roman empire and "Germania" had by this time become a region where older populations had been added to significantly by generations of Roman border troops, Germanic clients, and then various "barbarian" peoples from outside the empire, some of whom had been under the hegemony of Attila the Hun. "Elbe Germans", came from the river Elbe to the north, which was under Thuringian rule, and is where the Lombards had also been. But also more northern groups had moved along the Elbe from the direction of the North Sea, as did some Saxons who joined the Lombards, and possibly the Heruls. Also, East Germanic groups such as the Goths had entered the Pannonian region east of the Bavarians in the generations leading up to the empire of Attila. These peoples had not only contributed to the Hunnic empire, but also sometimes been settled peacefully as Roman foederati.

Also entering the area, more contemporary with the Bavarians and Lombards, were Slavs, who particularly settled the Upper Palatinate as well as around Regensburg itself (distr. Großprüfening).

Neighboring the emerging Bavarian people in the 6th to 7th centuries were the Alamanni to the west (with the river Lech as boundary, which remains a dialectal division today), and Thuringians to the north, both dominated to some extent by the Franks as were the Bavarians (in the late 7th century however, there was a period where Radulf, King of Thuringia rebelled and some independence was returned to these three regions for a while).) Slavs were settling to the north-east, and Goths and Langobards to the east and south were later displaced by Slavs and Magyars.

Much like was the case in neighboring Alemannia, Bavaria was nominally Christian by virtue of being ruled by Christian dukes from the 6th century, but Christianization of its population was a gradual process lasting throughout the 7th century and into the 8th; Saint Corbinian was sent by Pope Gregory II to minister to duke Grimoald and work towards the evangelization of Bavaria; he became the first bishop of Freising. A Diocese of Laureacum (Lorch) had been in existence since the 4th century, in the 8th century moved to Passau, which became a bridge-head for the Christianization of Austria and Hungary. The Bishopric of Regensburg was founded in 739 by Boniface. The Lex Baiuvariorum was a codex of Germanic law, comprising 23 articles of traditional law recorded in the 740s. Bavaria within the Carolingian Empire was bordering on Swabia in the west, Thuringia in the north, Lombardy in the south and Slavic Carinthia in the east.

=== Holy Roman Empire ===
The Duchy of Bavaria was a stem duchy of the Holy Roman Empire, established in the 10th century, derived from an earlier duchy ruled by the Frankish Agilolfings during the 6th to 8th centuries.

The Margraviate of Austria was formed an eastern march to the Duchy of Bavaria in 976, and became a duchy in its own right, the Duchy of Austria, in 1156, in the 13th century falling under the dominion of the House of Habsburg. In the 14th and 15th centuries, upper and lower Bavaria were repeatedly subdivided. Four Duchies (or "partial duchies", Teilherzogtümer) existed after the division of 1392: Lower Bavaria-Straubing, lower Bavaria-Landshut, Bavaria-Ingolstadt and Bavaria-Munich.

Munich, now the capital and cultural center of Bavaria, was founded in the high medieval period, and was the capital of the "partial duchy" of Bavaria-Munich 1392–1503. In 1503, Bavaria was re-united by Duke Albrecht IV of Bavaria-Munich (although the formerly Bavarian offices Kufstein, Kitzbühel and Rattenberg in Tirol were lost in 1504) and established Munich as the capital of all of Bavaria in 1506. In 1623, Bavaria was elevated to Electorate (Kurfürstentum).

=== Modern history ===
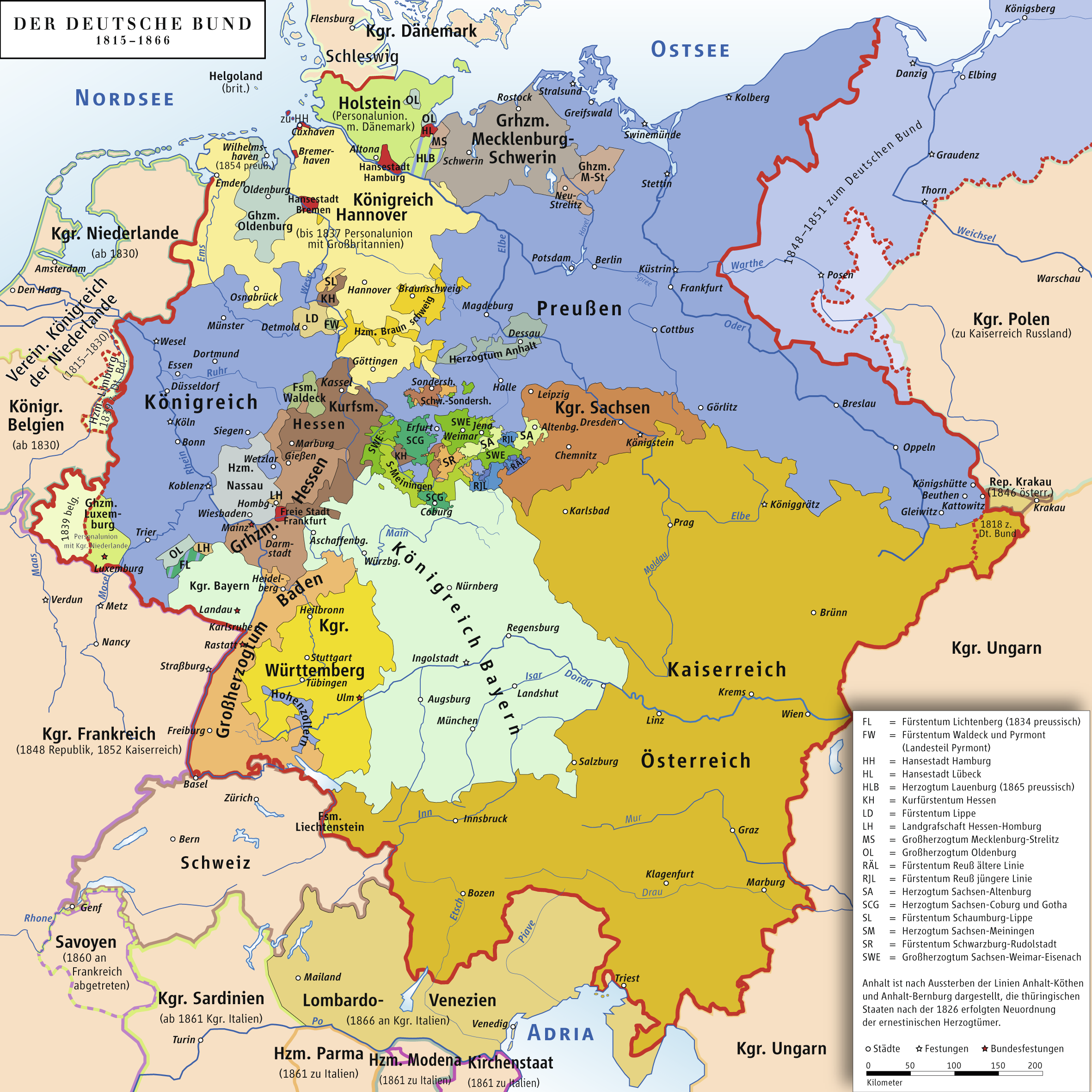
Kingdom of Bavaria within the German Confederation 1816, including the Rhenish Palatinate

The Kingdom of Bavaria was established at the Peace of Pressburg (1805), in the wake of the French victory at Austerlitz. The kingdom's territory fluctuated greatly over the following years, eventually fixed at the Treaty of Paris (1814), which established most of what remain the borders of the modern state. The kingdom in 1837 was divided into eight administrative regions (Regierungsbezirke), Upper Bavaria, Lower Bavaria, Franconia, Swabia, Upper Palatinate and Palatinate. Ludwig I of Bavaria changed his royal titles to Ludwig, King of Bavaria, Duke of Franconia, Duke in Swabia and Count Palatinate of the Rhine.

As of 1818, the total population of the kingdom was at 3.7 million, rising to 4.4 million by 1840 and to 6.2 million by 1900, reaching 6.5 million in 1910. Modern Bavaria has 12.5 million inhabitants (as of 2012); the population of Altbayern or Bavaria proper is at 6.7 million.

== List of notable Bavarians ==
=== Scientists ===
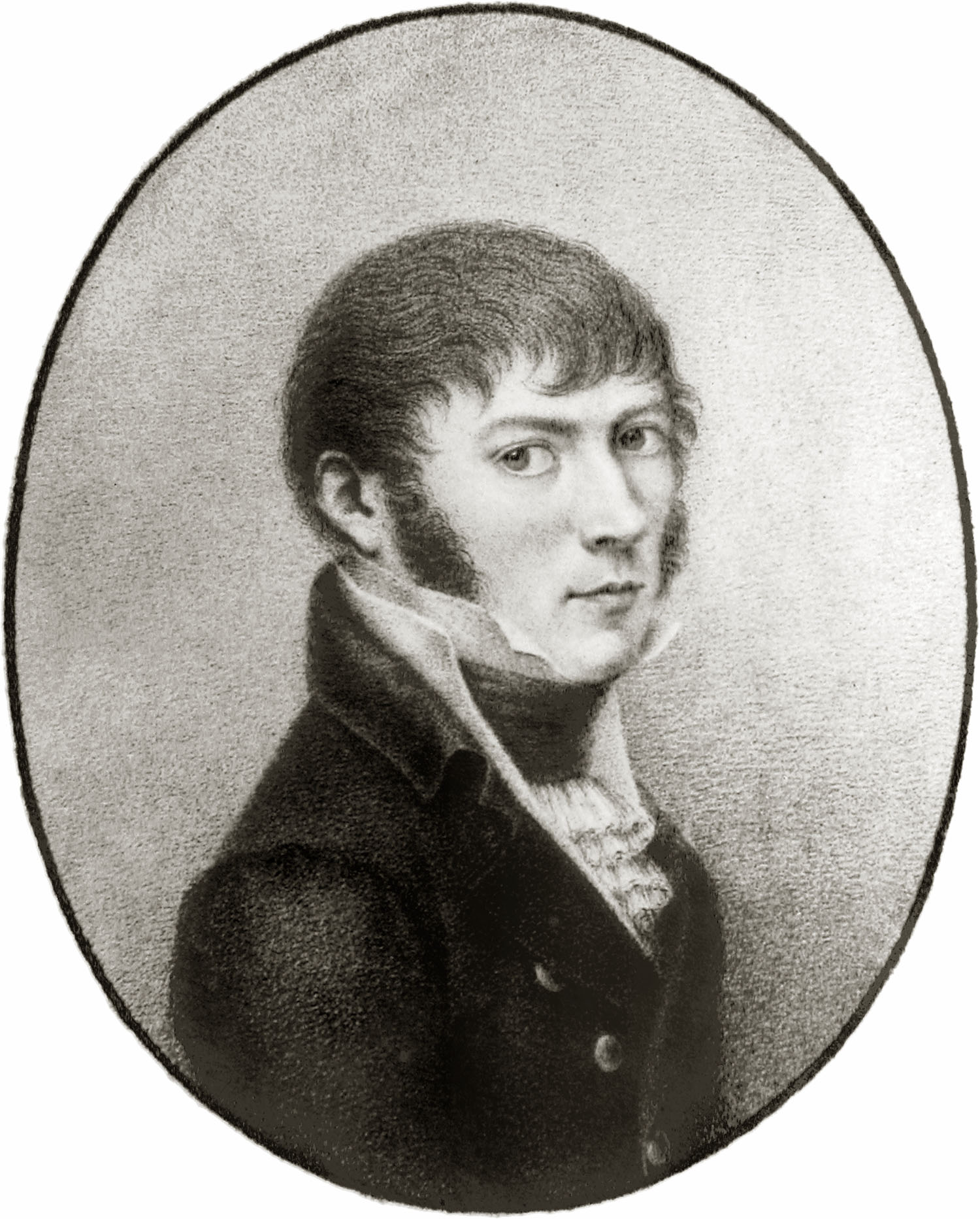
Joseph von Fraunhofer

- Johann Schmidlap (16th century), fireworks maker and rocket pioneer
- Joseph von Fraunhofer (1787–1826), physicist known for discovering the dark absorption lines known as Fraunhofer lines in the sun's spectrum
- Max Joseph von Pettenkofer (1818–1901), chemist and hygienist
- Johannes Stark (1874–1957), physicist, laureate of the 1919 Nobel Prize in Physics
- Ludwig Prandtl (1875–1953), fluid dynamicist, physicist, and aerospace scientist
- Feodor Lynen (1911–1979), biochemist, laureate of the 1964 Nobel Prize in Physiology or Medicine
- Rudolf Mössbauer (1929–2011), physicist, laureate of the 1961 Nobel Prize in Physics

=== Business ===
- Johanna Händlmaier (?–1950), company co-founder of Händlmaier and creator of a recipe for a sweet Bavarian mustard
- Stefan Schörghuber (1961–2008), businessman

=== Politicians ===
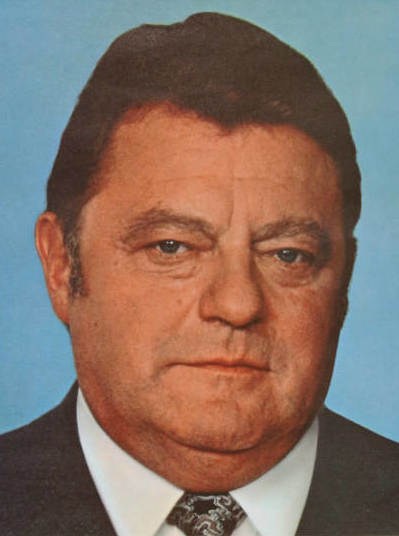
Franz Josef Strauß

- Maximilian II of Bavaria (1811–1864), King of Bavaria (1848–1864)
- Ludwig II of Bavaria (1845–1886), King of Bavaria (1864–1886)
- Heinrich Luitpold Himmler (1900–1945), Reichsführer of the Schutzstaffel and a leading member of the Nazi Party (NSDAP) of Germany
- Franz Josef Strauß (1915–1988), politician, Minister-President of Bavaria (1978–1988)
- Henry Kissinger (1923-2023), politician, 56th U.S. Secretary of State (1973-1977)
- Roman Herzog (1934–2017), politician, judge, and legal scholar, President of the Federal Republic of Germany (1994–1999)
- Edmund Stoiber (1941–), politician, Minister-President of Bavaria (1993–2007)
- Horst Seehofer (1949–), politician, Minister-President of Bavaria (2008–2018)

=== Artists ===
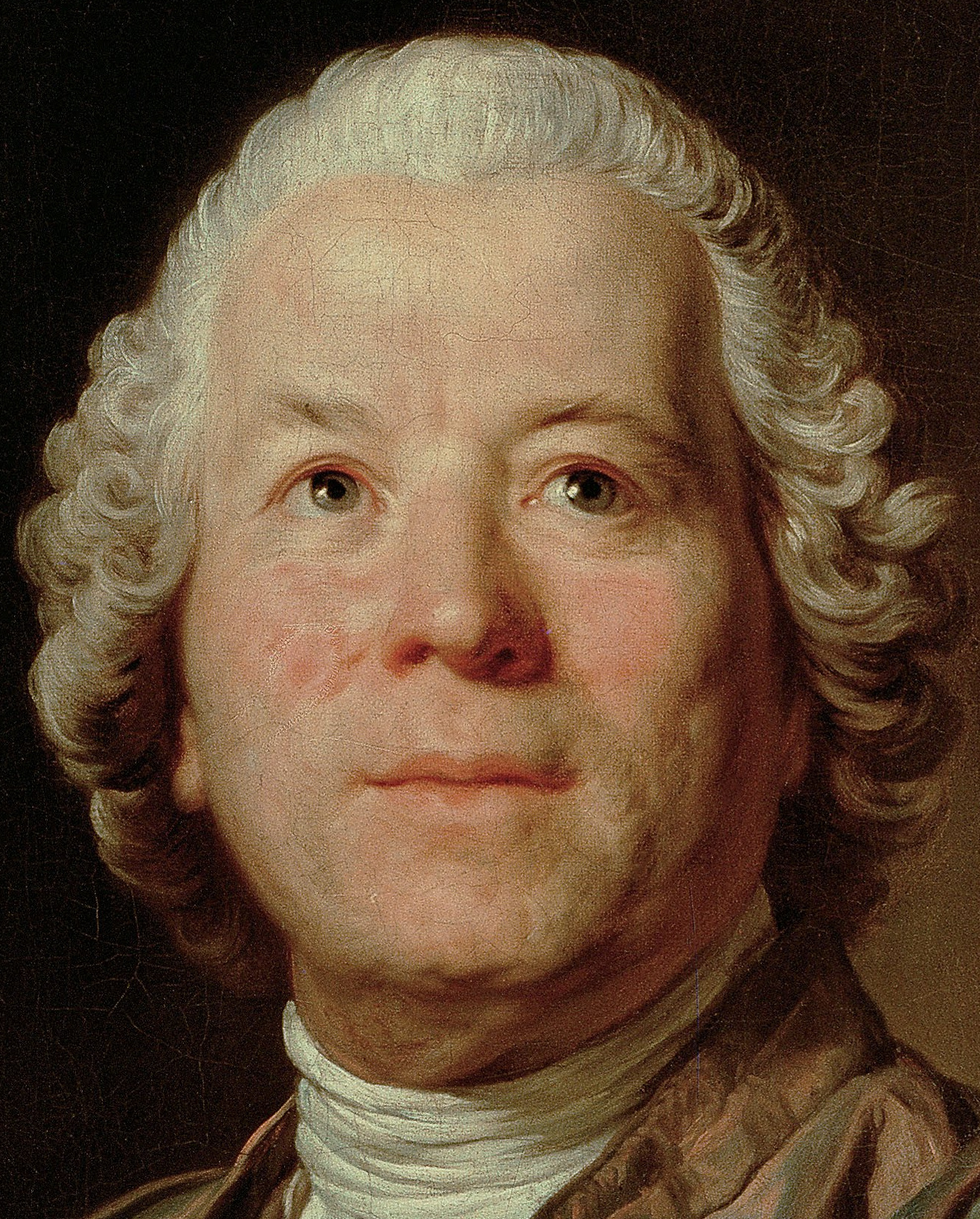
Christoph Willibald Gluck

- Asam brothers, Cosmas Damian (1686–1739) and Egid Quirin (1692–1750), sculptors, workers in stucco, painters, and architects
- Christoph Willibald Gluck (1714–1787), composer
- Franz Hanfstaengl (1804–1877), painter, lithographer, and photographer
- Carl Spitzweg (1808–1885), painter
- Richard Strauss (1864–1949), composer, conductor, pianist, and violinist
- Ludwig Thoma (1867–1921), writer
- Emerenz Meier (1874–1928), folk poet
- Franz Marc (1880–1916), painter and printmaker
- Karl Valentin (1882–1948), comedian
- Carl Orff (1895–1982), composer and music educator
- Michael Ende (1929–1995), writer
- Franzl Lang (1930–2015), singer and actor
- Gerhard Polt (1942–), writer, filmmaker, actor, and cabaret artist
- Werner Herzog (1942–), filmmaker, actor, and writer
- W.G. Sebald (1944–2001), writer and academic
- Uschi Glas (1944–), actress and singer
- Rainer Werner Fassbinder (1945-1982), filmmaker, actor
- Patrick Süskind (1949–), writer and screenwriter
- Bernd Eichinger (1949–2011), film producer, director, and screenwriter
- Ottfried Fischer (1953–), retired actor and Kabarett artist
- Jonas Kaufmann (1969–), operatic tenor

=== Athletes ===
- Franz Beckenbauer (1945–2024), former professional footballer and manager
- Rosi Mittermaier (1950–2023), alpine skier
- Philipp Lahm (1983–), former professional footballer and captain of the German national team which won the 2014 World Cup
- Magdalena Neuner (1987–), former professional biathlete
- Thomas Müller (1989–), professional footballer
- Bastian Schweinsteiger (1984-), former professional footballer

=== Others ===
- Herenaus Haid (1784–1873), theologian
- Nikolaus Hollweg (1897–1923), World War I veteran and Bavarian police officer who was killed during the Beer Hall Putsch.
- Traudl Junge (1920–2002), from 1942 to 1945 secretary of Adolf Hitler
- Joseph Ratzinger (1927–2022), professor of theology and from 2005 to 2013 Pope Benedict XVI
- Werner Heisenberg (1901-1976), theoretical physicist; major pioneer of the theory of Quantum mechanics, principal scientist in the German nuclear program during World War II

== See also ==
- Weisswurstäquator, German for the White Sausage Equator. A humorous term used in Germany to describe the dividing line between Southern Germany (including Bavaria) and Northern Germany.
- Swabians, another Germanic ethnic group
- Frisians, another Germanic ethnic group
- Bavarian nationalism
