= Sophia of Bavaria =

Queen of Germany (1389–1419) and Bohemia (1389–1419)

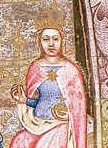

Queen consort of Bohemia
- Tenure: 2 May 1389 – 16 Aug 1419
- Coronation: 13 March 1400

Queen consort of Germany
- Tenure: 2 May 1389 – 20 August 1400
- Born: 1376
- Died: 4 November 1428 (aged 52); Pressburg (now Bratislava)
- Burial: St Martin's Cathedral, Pressburg (now Bratislava)
- Spouse: Wenceslaus, King of the Romans
- Father: John II, Duke of Bavaria
- Mother: Catherine of Gorizia

Sophia Euphemia of Bavaria (Czech: Žofie Bavorská; German: Sophie von Bayern; 1376 – 4 November 1428) was a Queen of Bohemia and the spouse of Wenceslaus, King of Bohemia, King of the Romans and Duke of Luxembourg. She was briefly interim regent of Bohemia after the death of Wenceslaus in 1419.

== Early life ==
Sophia was a member of the House of Wittelsbach and was the youngest child and only daughter of John II, Duke of Bavaria-Munich, and his spouse Catherine of Gorizia. Sophia's two brothers were Ernest, Duke of Bavaria-Munich, and William III, Duke of Bavaria.

Her paternal grandparents were Stephen II, Duke of Bavaria and his first wife Elisabetta of Sicily, daughter of King Frederick III of Sicily and Eleanor of Anjou. Sophia was a cousin of Isabeau of Bavaria, Queen of France. Sophia's maternal grandparents were Count Meinhard VI of Gorizia and Catharina of Pfannberg.

Sophia grew up in the care of her uncle, Frederick, Duke of Bavaria, in Landshut. Sophia liked hunting, which was one thing she had in common with her future husband. In 1388 uncle took her to Prague, where he worked through political negotiations to have his niece married off. He said that the twelve-year-old princess was impressed with Wenceslaus, moreover, the marriage was for political reasons. Sophia's father was represented in the negotiation of the marriage by her uncle Duke Frederick.

== Queen ==
On 2 May 1389 in Prague, Sophia married Wenceslaus, King of the Romans. Wenceslas and Sophia were probably married by the king's chancellor, Bishop Jan. Wenceslaus was in a dispute with the Archbishop of Prague, which threatened Sophia's coronation. She could have only been crowned queen by an archbishop.

Wenceslaus celebrated the marriage by making a number of excellent manuscripts such as the Wenceslas Bible. There was also a manuscript on marital fidelity. The relationship was described as happy. Sophia had no children.

Sophia's husband was certainly not an incompetent ruler, in chronicles he was described in a biased manner. Sophia is described as economically talented. In March 1393, her confessor Saint John of Nepomuk died under torture. It was said that he died refusing to reveal her confession, but he was also at that time involved in a conflict with the Archbishop of Prague Jan of Jenštejn. During the rebellion and the imprisonment of her spouse in 1402–1403, she lived in Hradec Králové. Queen Sophia was initially a follower of Jan Hus and listened to his sermons, and like Wenceslaus, she gave him her protection. After Hus was banned by the Pope in 1410, however, she withdrew her support. She was convinced that the death of Hus, in 1415, would lead to a riot.

== Queen dowager regent ==
Wenceslaus died in 1419. As a queen dowager, Sophia sought refuge with her brother-in-law, Sigismund of Hungary, whose claims on the throne of Bohemia she supported. For a period of time, Sophia was the official regent of Bohemia.

In October 1419, the leading Bohemians signed a treaty with queen dowager Sophia with a promise to protect law and order. She soon lost authority, however. Sophia and Sigismund were involved in managing a property in Prešpurk together. There were rumours that Sophia and Sigismund had an affair. Sigismund remarked that the Queen dowager of Bohemia would surely marry again – possibly to Wladyslaw II Jagiello of Poland.

Sophia died on 4 November 1428.

== Sources and Literature ==
- BAUER J. Podivné konce českých panovnic. Vydání 1. Třebíč: Akcent, 2002.
- ČECHURA, J. Ženy a milenky českých králů. Vydání 1. Praha: Akropolis, 1994.
- ČECHURA, Jaroslav. České země v letech 1378–1437. Lucemburkové na českém trůně II. Praha: Libri, 2000. 438 s. ISBN 80-85983-98-2.
- KOPIČKOVÁ, B., Mnichovský fascikl č. 543. Korespondence královny Žofie z období březen 1422 – prosinec 1427. In: Mediaevalia Historica Bohemica 8, 2001, s. 121–138.
- SPĚVÁČEK, Jiří. Václav IV. 1361–1419. K předpokladům husitské revoluce. Praha: Nakladatelství Svoboda, 1986. 773 s.
- ŠMAHEL, F. - BOBKOVÁ, L. (eds.), Lucemburkové. Česká koruna uprostřed Evropy, Praha: NLN 2012, str. 758–762.

Royal titles
| Preceded by Joanna of Bavaria | Queen consort of Germany; 1389–1400 | Succeeded by Elisabeth of Nuremberg |
| Preceded by Joanna of Bavaria | Queen consort of Bohemia; 1389–1419 | Succeeded by Barbara of Cilli |
