= Margaret of Brandenburg (1410–1465) =

Duchess of Mecklenburg, Duchess of Ingolstandt

- Born: 1410
- Died: 27 July 1465; Landshut
- Noble family: House of Hohenzollern
- Spouses: Albert V, Duke of Mecklenburg; Louis VIII of Bavaria-Ingolstadt; Count Martin of Waldenfels
- Father: Frederick I, Elector of Brandenburg
- Mother: Elisabeth of Bavaria-Landshut

Margaret of Brandenburg (1410 – 27 July 1465, Landshut) was a Princess of Brandenburg by birth and through successive marriages Duchess of Mecklenburg, Duchess of Bavaria-Ingolstadt and Countess of Waldenfels.

Margaret was a daughter of Elector Frederick I of Brandenburg (1371–1440) from his marriage to Elisabeth of Bavaria-Landshut (1383–1442), daughter of Duke Frederick of Bavaria-Landshut. Margaret's brothers were Frederick II and Albert III Achilles, who successively ruled Brandenburg.

She married in 1423 Duke Albert V of Mecklenburg, but he died shortly after his marriage, even before they could begin living together. Margaret received as dowry Dömitz and Gorlosen from her father.

On 20 July 1441 Margaret married Louis VIII of Bavaria-Ingolstadt (1403–1445), to secure peace in the land. Through this marriage, Louis regained possessions he had lost to Elector Frederick I during the Bavarian War of 1420–1422. Two children were born of this marriage. Both, however, died young.

In 1446, finally, Margaret secretly married her tutor, Count Martin of Waldenfels (d. 1471). This relationship has been incorporated into the tragedy Louis the Bearded by Georg Köberle, published in 1844.

== References and sources ==
- Beatrix Schönewald (2004), "Die Herzoginnen von Bayern-Ingolstadt", Sammelblatt des Historischen Vereins Ingolstadt (in German), vol. 113, pp. 35–54, especially pp. 52–53
- Bernhard Glasauer (2009), Herzog Heinrich XVI. (1393–1450) der Reiche von Bayern-Landshut. Territorialpolitik zwischen Dynastie und Reich (thesis), Münchner Beiträge zur Geschichtswissenschaft (in German), vol. 5, München: Herbert Utz Verlag, ISBN 978-3-8316-0899-7
- Renate Kremer (2000), Die Auseinandersetzungen um das Herzogtum Bayern-Ingolstadt 1438–1450 (thesis), Schriftenreihe zur bayerischen Landesgeschichte (in German), vol. 113, München: C. H. Beck, ISBN 3-406-10694-3
- Theodor Straub (1992), "Die fünf Ingolstädter Herzoginnen", Bayern-Ingolstadt, Bayern-Landshut. 1392–1506. Glanz und Elend einer Teilung (in German), Ingolstadt: Stadtarchiv Ingolstadt, pp. 43–50, especially pp. 49–50, ISBN 3-932113-06-3
