= Ludwig VIII =

Ludwig VIII may refer to:

- Louis VIII, Duke of Bavaria (1403–1445)
- Louis VIII, Landgrave of Hesse-Darmstadt (1691–1768)
