= Adolf, Duke of Bavaria =

Duke Of Bavaria from 1435 to 1441

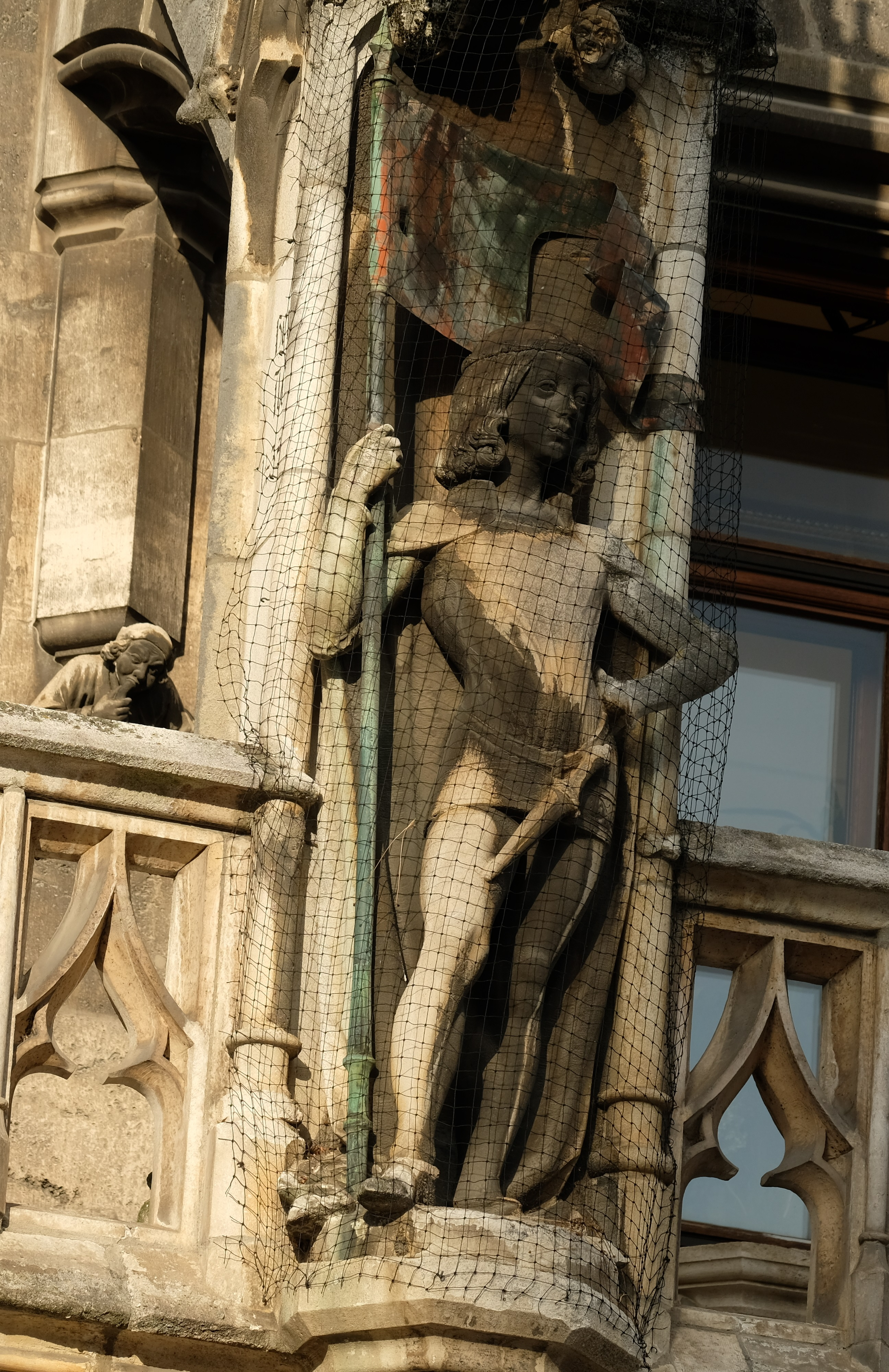
Statue of Adolf, Duke of Bavaria at the New Town Hall (Munich)

Adolf (7 January 1434, Munich - 24 October 1441, Munich) was a German nobleman. He was a Duke of Bavaria-Munich in the House of Wittelsbach.

He was the eldest son of William III, Duke of Bavaria and Margaret of Cleves. His younger brother William of Bavaria-Munich died in infancy. Since William III's brother Ernest and Ernest's son Albert III were available as ruling dukes, Adolf's role was very limited. Having been made a duke at the age of one, he died aged only seven and thus had little effect on the duchy's fortunes.

Adolf, Duke of Bavaria House of Wittelsbach
Regnal titles
Preceded by William III	Duke of Bavaria-Munich; 1435-1441	Succeeded by Albert III
