= Catherine of Gorizia =

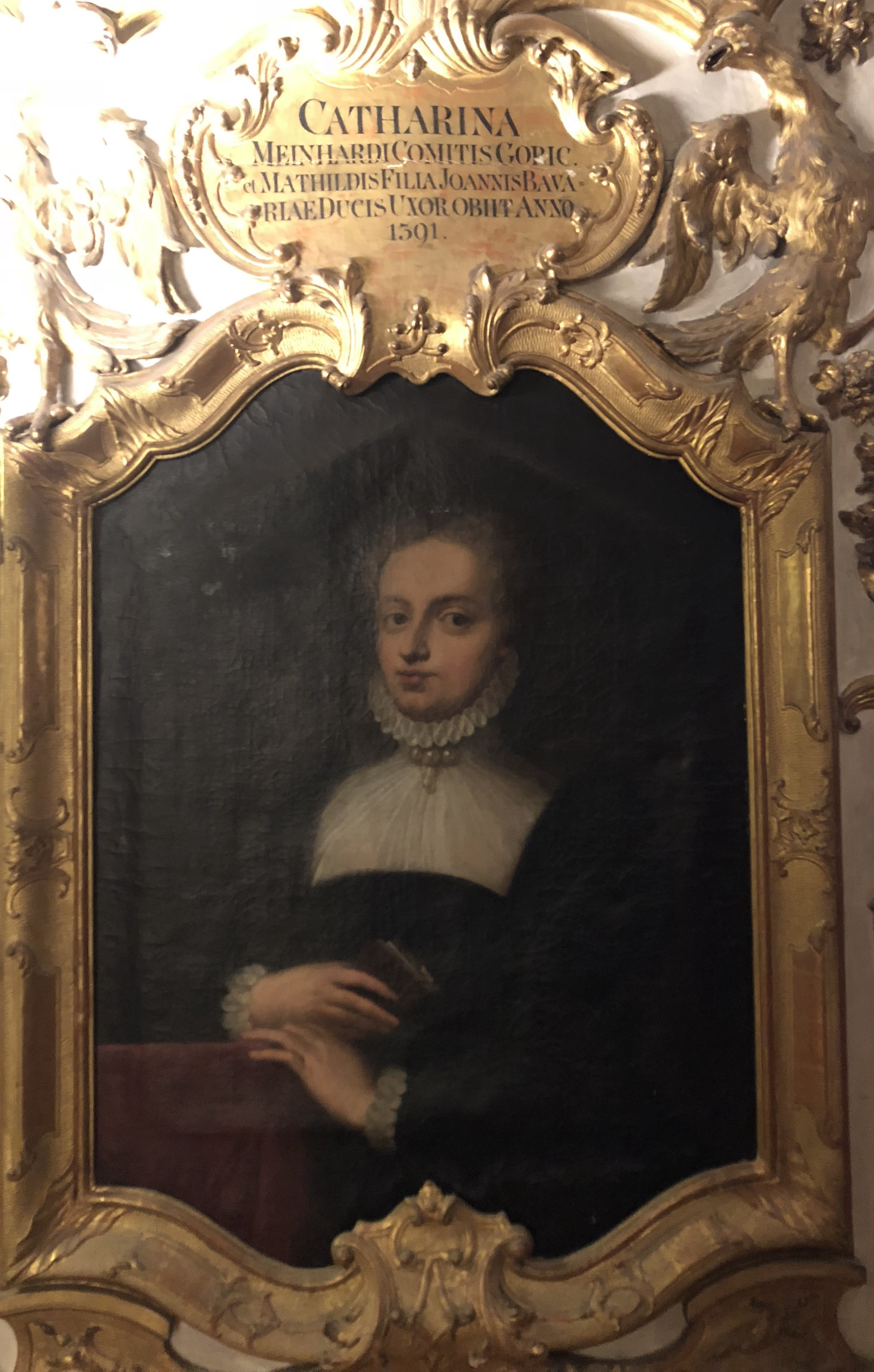
- Catherine of Gorizia (1350–1391), daughter of Meinhard VI of Gorizia and the wife of John II, Duke of Bavaria, in the Ancestral Gallery (Ahnengallerie) at the Residenz in Munich, Germany
- Died: 1391
- Noble family: Meinhardiner
- Spouse: John II, Duke of Bavaria
- Issue: Ernest I of Bavaria-Munich; William III of Bavaria-Munich; Sophia, Queen of Germany
- Father: Meinhard VI of Gorizia
- Mother: Catherine of Pfannberg

Catherine of Gorizia (died 1391) was the daughter of Count Meinhard VI of Gorizia and his first wife Catherine of Pfannberg.

== Marriage and issue ==
In 1372, she married Duke John II of Bavaria-Munich. They had three children:

- Ernest, Duke of Bavaria-Munich (1373 – 2 July 1438 in Munich)
- William III, Duke of Bavaria-Munich (1375 in Munich – 1435 in Munich)
- Sofia of Bavaria (1376 – 26 September 1425 in Bratislava), married on 2 May 1389 in Prague to King Wenceslaus
