= Parakeet Society =

The Parakeet Society was a union of the enemies of Louis VII the Bearded, duke of Bavaria-Ingolstadt. It was founded on April 17, 1414 by his cousin, duke Henry XVI of Bavaria-Landshut. The other members of the society were Ernest of Bavaria-Munich, his brother William III and John, Count Palatine of Neumarkt.

On February 16, 1415, Frederick of Nuremberg and Elector Palatine Louis III became members of the society. Its members met on July 8, 1415 at the Council of Constance and turned the society into a union for mutual defense against Louis VII, to persist until Louis’ death. This anti-Louis alliance became known as the League of Constance.

All the members of the Parakeet Society were princes. The symbol of the society, the parakeet, was intended to make fun of Louis’ coat of arms, which showed the raven of Oswald of Northumbria.
