= League of Constance =

The League of Constance may refer to:

- League of Constance (1415), an alliance of German princes against Louis VII, Duke of Bavaria
- League of Constance (1474), an alliance uniting the Swiss, Rhineland towns and the duke of Austria against Charles the Bold, Duke of Burgundy
