= Ernest, Duke of Bavaria =

Duke of Bavaria-Munich

Ernest
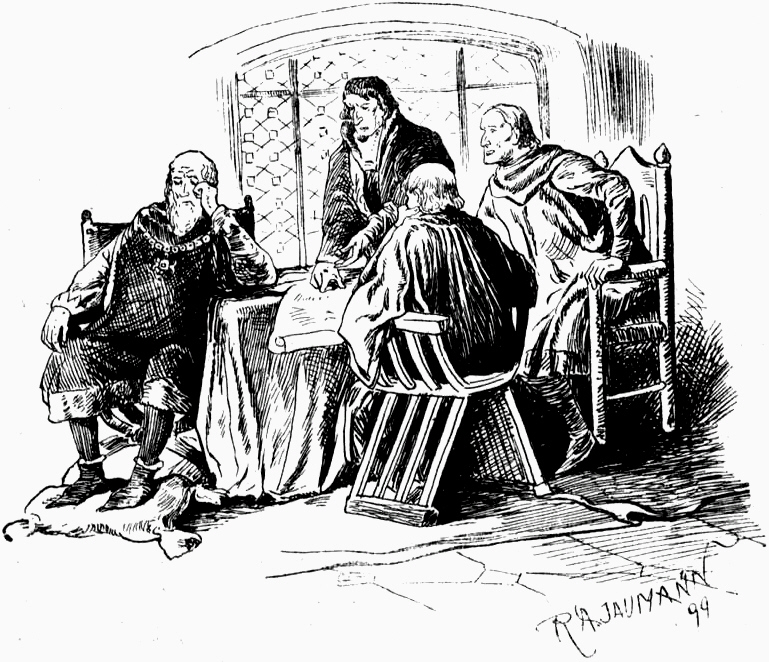
- Born: 1373; Munich
- Died: 2 July 1438; Munich
- Buried: Frauenkirche in Munich
- Noble family: House of Wittelsbach
- Spouse: Elisabetta Visconti
- Issue: Albert III, Duke of Bavaria
- Father: John II, Duke of Bavaria
- Mother: Catherine of Gorizia

Ernest of Bavaria-Munich (German: Ernst, Herzog von Bayern-München), (Munich, 1373 – 2 July 1438 in Munich), from 1397 Duke of Bavaria-Munich.

== Biography ==
Ernest was a son of John II and ruled the duchy of Bavaria-Munich together with his brother William III.

He restrained uprisings of the citizenry of Munich in 1396 and 1410 and forced his uncle Stephen III to confine his reign to Bavaria-Ingolstadt in 1402. Afterwards Ernest still fought several times successfully against the dukes of Bavaria-Ingolstadt Stephen III and his son Louis VII the Bearded as ally of Henry XVI of Bavaria-Landshut. He was a member of the Parakeet Society and of the League of Constance.

After the extinction of the Wittelsbach dukes of Bavaria-Straubing, counts of Holland and Hainaut, Ernest and his brother William struggled with Henry and Louis but finally received half of Bavaria-Straubing including the city of Straubing in 1429.

As ally of the House of Luxembourg Ernest backed his deposed brother in law Wenceslaus against the new king Rupert of the older branch of his own Wittelsbach dynasty as well as Wenceslaus' brother Sigismund in his wars against the supporters of Jan Hus. This led to devastations in Northern Bavaria until 1434.

When his son Albert III married secretly the maid Agnes Bernauer in 1432, Ernest ordered her murdered. She was accused of witchcraft and thrown into the River Danube and drowned. The civil war with his son finally ended with a reconciliation. He is buried in the Frauenkirche in Munich.

== Family and children ==
Ernest married, in Pfaffenhofen an der Ilm, on 26 January 1395 to Elisabetta Visconti, daughter of Bernabò Visconti and had the following children:

1. Albert III, Duke of Bavaria (23 March 1401, Munich–29 February 1460, Munich)
2. Beatrix (c. 1403–12 March 1447, Neumarkt), married to:
  1. 1424 in Ortenburg Count Hermann III of Cilli;
  2. 1428 in Riedenburg Count Palatine John of Neumarkt.
3. Elisabeth (c. 1406–5 March 1468, Heidelberg), married to:
  1. 1430 in Mainz Adolf, Duke of Jülich-Berg;
  2. 1440 in Worms Count Hesso of Leiningen.
4. Amalie (1408–1432), a nun in St. Klara Monastery in Munich.

== Sources ==
- Thomas, Andrew L. (2010). A House Divided: Wittelsbach Confessional Court Cultures in the Holy Roman Empire, c. 1550-1650. Brill.

Ernest, Duke of Bavaria House of Wittelsbach Born: 1373 Died: 2 July 1438
Regnal titles
Preceded by John II	Duke of Bavaria-Munich; 1397 – 1438	Succeeded by Albert III
Preceded by John III	Duke of Bavaria-Straubing; 1429 – 1438	Succeeded by Albert III
