= Henry XVI of Bavaria =

Duke of Bavaria-Landshut (1386–1450)

Henry XVI
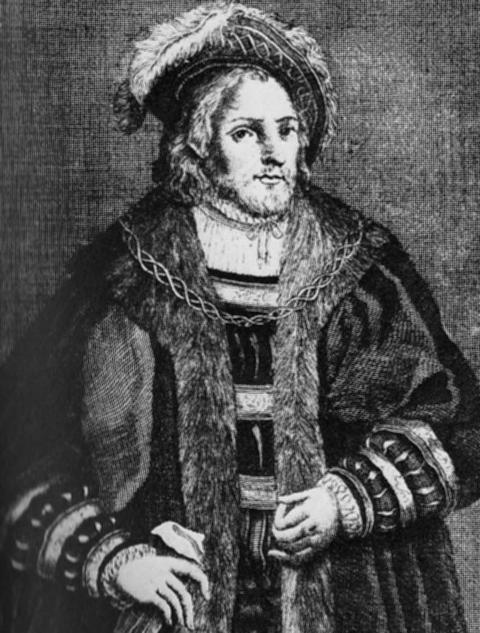
- Portrait of Henry XVI, 15th century

Duke of Bavaria-Landshut
- Reign: 4 December 1393 – 30 July 1450
- Predecessor: Frederick
- Successor: Louis IX

Duke of Bavaria-Ingolstadt
- Reign: 7 April 1445 – 30 July 1450
- Predecessor: Louis VIII
- Successor: Louis IX
- Born: 1386 probably Burghausen Castle
- Died: 30 July 1450 (aged 63–64); Landshut
- Spouse: Margaret of Austria
- Issue: Albrecht; Friedrich; Ludwig IX "der Reiche"; Johanna; Elisabeth; Margarete
- House: House of Wittelsbach
- Father: Frederick, Duke of Bavaria
- Mother: Maddalena Visconti

Henry XVI of Bavaria, also listed as Henry IV of Bavaria-Landshut (1386 – 30 July 1450, in Landshut; German: Heinrich der Reiche, Herzog von Bayern-Landshut, lit. 'Henry the Rich, Duke of Bavaria-Landshut'), from 1393 Duke of Bavaria-Landshut. He was the son of Duke Frederick and Maddalena Visconti, daughter of Bernabò Visconti.

== Life ==
Henry was the eldest child of Frederick and Maddalena. He had two younger sisters, Elizabeth and Magdalena, and an older half-sister, Isabella, from his father's first marriage to Anna of Neuffen..

After the death of his father in 1393 when Henry was only seven years old, his mother Maddalena was made regent for her young son, while Henry`s two paternal uncles Stephen and John were made guardians.

Maddalena died in 1404 and from then on Henry ruled by himself.

Henry became engaged to Margaret of Austria in 1405. Since Henry and Margaret were related within the third degree, a papal dispensation had to be granted from Pope Alexander VI. The dispensation was granted on November 12,1412. Henry and the 17-year old Margaret were then married at Bayern-Landshut on the 25 November of the same year.

Duke Henry XVI was the first of the three famous rich dukes, who reigned Bavaria-Landshut in the 15th century. Their residence was Trausnitz Castle in Landshut, a fortification which attained enormous dimensions. Having inherited not only the black hair but also the despotic temperament of the Visconti, Henry oppressed very cruelly uprisings of the citizenry of Landshut in 1410 and fought successfully against his cousin Louis VII the Bearded, the duke of Bavaria-Ingolstadt. He united Louis’ enemies in the Parakeet Society of 1414 and the League of Constance of 1415.

While the duchy of Bavaria-Straubing was still divided between Bavaria-Ingolstadt, Bavaria-Munich and Bavaria-Landshut after the extinction of the dukes of Straubing in 1429, Henry managed to receive the duchy of Bavaria-Ingolstadt almost completely in 1447. Henry died in 1450, it is not sure if the plague was the cause as sometimes reported. He was succeeded by his only surviving son Louis IX the Rich.

Henry banished his wife to Burghausen Castle to extend his freedom. His son and grandson took over this tradition, even though not all later marriages were that unhappy.

== Family and children ==
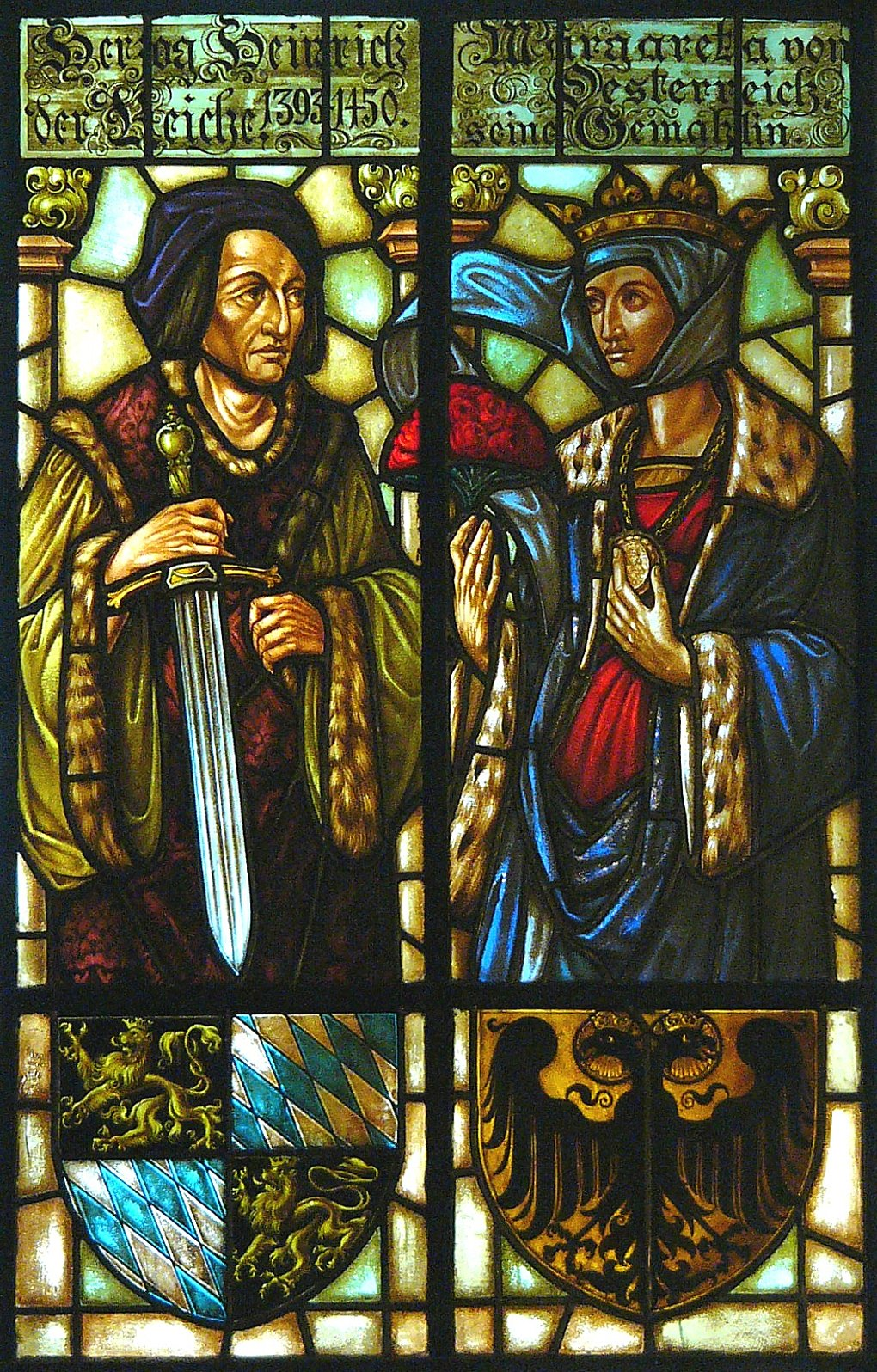
Henry XVI and his wife Margaret

He was married in Landshut on 25 November 1412 to Margaret, daughter of Duke Albert IV of Austria and Joanna Sophia of Bavaria. Their children were:

1. Albert (1414, Burghausen – ca. 1418).
2. Frederick (1415 – 7 June 1416, Burghausen).
3. Louis IX (23 February 1417, Burghausen – 18 January 1479, Landshut).
4. Joanna (1413 – 20 July 1444, Mosbach), married in Burghausen in 1430 to Count Palatine Otto I of Mosbach.
5. Elizabeth (1419 – 1 January 1451, Landshut), married in Stuttgart 1445 to Ulrich V, Count of Württemberg.
6. Margaret (b. 1420), a nun at Seligental.

He also had one or several mistresses of whom nothing is known, with whom he had three illegitimate children:

1. Georg von Zangberg, who married and had offspring.
2. Elisabeth von Zangberg, a nun.
3. Barbara von Zangberg, a nun.

== See also ==
- Zangberg in Bavaria

Henry XVI of Bavaria House of Wittelsbach Born: 1386 Died: 30 July 1450
Regnal titles
Preceded by Frederick	Duke of Bavaria-Landshut; 1393–1450	Succeeded by Louis IX
Preceded by Louis VIII	Duke of Bavaria-Ingolstadt; 1447–1450	Succeeded by Louis IX
