= Margaret of Cleves, Duchess of Bavaria-Munich =

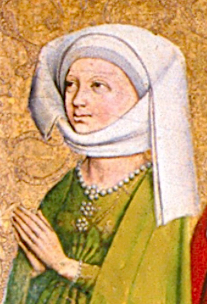
Margarethe von Cleve

Margaret of Cleves (23 February 1416 – 20 May 1444) was a German noblewoman. She was the eldest daughter of Adolph I, Duke of Cleves, and his second wife Marie of Burgundy. She married

- William III, Duke of Bavaria (1375–1435), having two sons with him:
  - Adolph (1434–1441);
  - William (1435);
- Ulrich V, Count of Württemberg (1413–1480), having one child with him
  - Catharina (1441–1497) - became a Premonstratensian then a Dominican nun in Würzburg, then finally ending up in the monastery under the protection of bishop Rudolf van Würzburg
