= Bavaria-Munich =

Duchy part of the Holy Roman Empire

Duchy of Bavaria-Munich Herzogtuom Baiern-Münichen (Middle High German)
- 1392–1505
- Banner of Bavaria-Munich Coat of arms of the Dukes of Bavaria-Munich

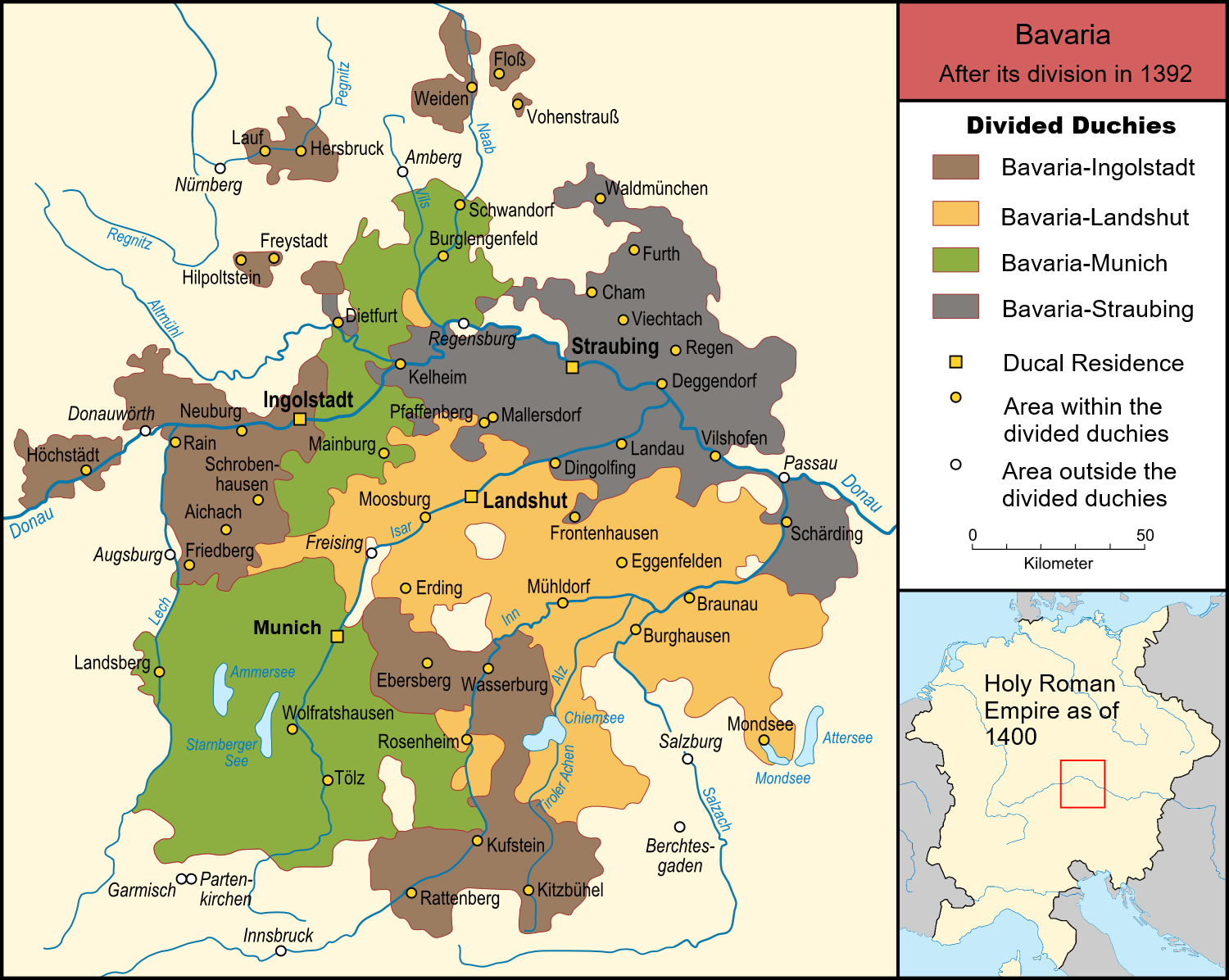
- Bavaria-Munich (green) with Bavaria-Landshut (orange), Bavaria-Ingolstadt (brown) and Bavaria-Straubing (grey)
- Status: Duchy
- Capital: Munich; 48°8′N 11°34′E
- Government: Monarchy
- Duke of Bavaria-Munich
  - 1392–1397: Johann II, Stephen III, and Friedrich
  - 1397–1438: Ernest and William III (until 1435)
  - 1438–1460: Albert III
  - 1460–1463: John IV and Sigismund
  - 1463–1465: Sigismund
  - 1465–1508: Sigismund (until 1467) and Albert IV
- Historical era: Middle Ages
  - Bavaria-Munich and Bavaria-Ingolstadt split off from Bavaria-Landshut: 1392
  - Bavaria-Munich, Bavaria-Ingolstadt, and Bavaria-Landshut divide Bavaria-Straubing: 1425
  - Bavaria-Dachau separates from Bavaria-Munich: 3 September 1467
  - Bavaria-Dachau returns to Bavaria-Munich: 1 February 1501
  - Reunification of the Duchy of Bavaria: 30 July 1505
Preceded by
Duchy of Bavaria
Upper Bavaria
Bavaria-Landshut
Succeeded by
Duchy of Bavaria

Bavaria-Munich (Middle High German: Baiern-Münichen) was a duchy that was a constituent state of the Holy Roman Empire from 1392 to 1505, ruled by the Wittelsbach dynasty. It was created after the division of the Bavarian inheritance in 1392, and was re-unified at the end of the War of the Succession of Landshut after the defeat of George the Rich. The dukes of the realm held court in Munich. It existed concurrently with Bavaria-Landshut and Bavaria-Ingolstadt.

== Territorial development ==
After Emperor Charles IV invaded Brandenburg, Otto V, Duke of Bavaria was allowed to keep his electoral dignity, and was furthermore extended lands in the Nordgau as compensation. Bavaria was split into parts that were roughly financially equal: the territorially disparate Bavaria-Ingolstadt and the largely territorially congruous Bavaria-Munich.

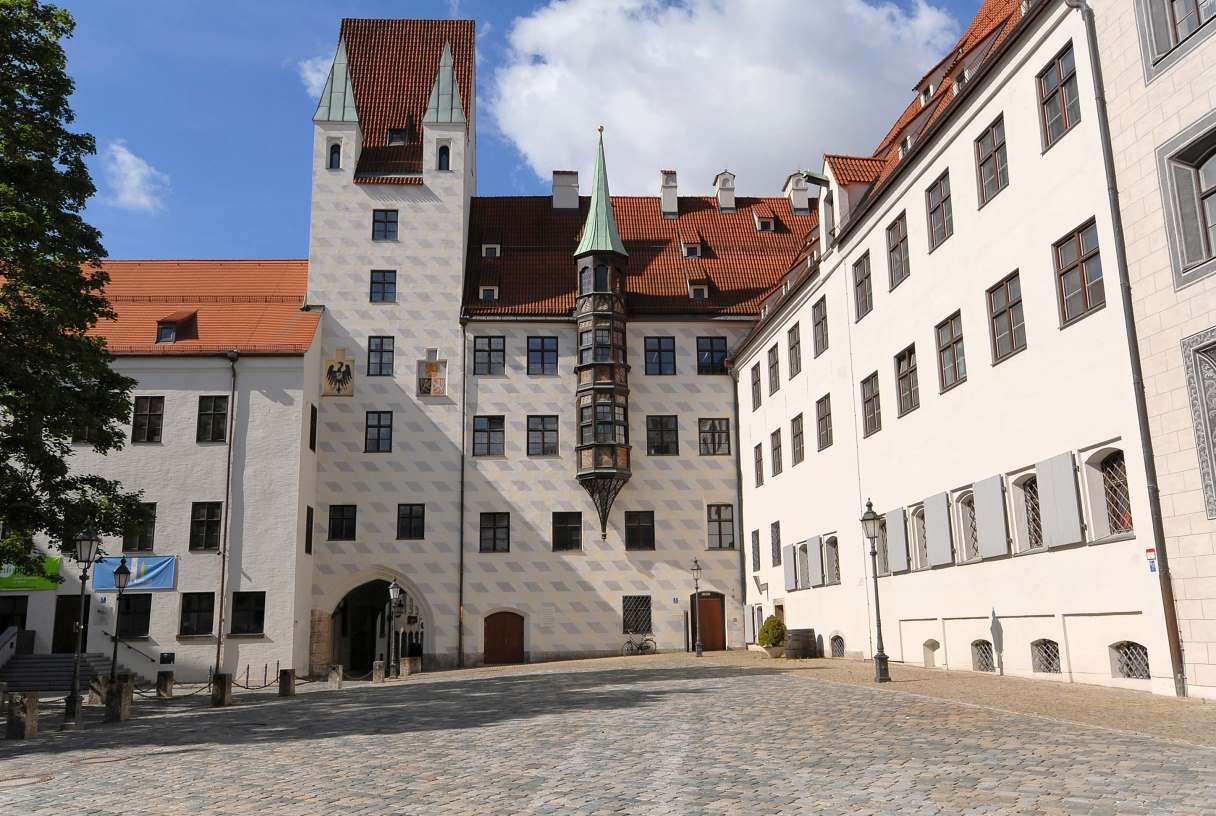
The Old Court in Munich

After the death of Stephen II in 1375, his sons Stephen III, Frederick, and John II jointly ruled Bavaria-Landshut. After seventeen years, the brothers decided to formally divide their inheritance. John received Bavaria-Munich, Stephen received Bavaria-Ingolstadt, while Frederick kept what remained of Bavaria-Landshut.

During the Great War of the Lords, Munich-Bavaria was able to take Markt Schwaben and Ebersberg from Bavaria-Ingolstadt. In the Bratislava Award, the Straubing Lands were also granted to the duchy. As a result, large swathes of the Bavarian Forest were granted to the duchy.

After the death of the last duke of Bavaria-Ingolstadt in 1447, Bayern-Landshut took control of the territory, with Bayern-Munich receiving very little. The ruler of Bavaria-Landshut, George the Rich, had no male heir, and thus designated his daughter Elizabeth as his heir. However, this was in contravention of both Wittelsbach and Imperial succession law, and so Albert IV began the War of the Succession of Landshut. After Duke Albert's victory, the realm was once again referred to simply as the Duchy of Bavaria.

== Political history ==
The Late Middle Ages in Bavaria were characterised by land divisions. The first division of Upper and Lower Bavaria took place in 1255 after the death of Otto II, Duke of Bavaria. Emperor Louis IV reunited the two realms, but once again split them between his six sons in the Landsburg Treaty of 1349. After the death of Meinhard, Duke of Upper Bavaria in 1363, his duchy went to Stephen II of Lower Bavaria-Landshut. However, in 1392, Stephen's sons divided the land again after 17 years of unified government. As a result, the three divided duchies of Bavaria-Landshut, Bavaria-Ingolstadt, and Bavaria-Munich were created. Bavaria-Landshut went to Duke Frederick, Bavaria-Ingolstadt went to Duke Stephen, and Bavaria-Munich went to Duke John.

=== Bavarian dynastic conflicts ===
Stephen III felt as if his share of the inheritance had been unfairly small, and so began the Bavarian Dynastic War of 1394/95 against the Munich and Ingolstadt lines. At the end of the hostilities, it was agreed that Bavaria-Munich and Bavaria-Ingolstadt should be governed jointly. After John II died in 1397, Stephen III sought to establish dominance over John's sons Ernest and William. He supported the Munich guilds to rise up against the young dukes in the Munich Riots of 1397–1403. However, in 1403, Ernest and Wilhelm restored order to their lands, and restored the divisions agreed upon in the division of 1392.

The next decade was characterised by conflict between Frederick's son Henry and Stephen's son Louis. Ludwig believed, like his father, that he had been disadvantaged by the inheritance, which eventually culminated in the Great War of the Lords. Ludwig hoped that he could use his military might in order to be duly compensated for the indignity his father had suffered at his allegedly meagre inheritance. Ernest and Wilhelm desperately sought to mediate between the two dukes, but eventually sided with the Landshuters in a settlement in 1410, which imposed a forced alliance between the two. However, they eventually shifted their support to Henry after he had been assaulted by Louis at the Council of Constance.

The Munich dukes won the confidence of Emperor Sigismund after William was appointed the protector of the Council of Basel. As a result, they successfully received territories in Lower Bavaria from the Bratislava Award of 1429. When William died, his son Adolf was merely a child, and thus the succession of Bavaria-Munich depended entirely upon Duke Albert of Bavaria-Munich. Albert's illegitimate liaisons with the commoner Agnes Bernauer further complicated the issue, and so his father Ernest ordered her to be drowned in the Danube. This briefly caused Albert to side with Ludwig, although Albert later reconciled with his father, and married Anna of Brunswick-Grubenhagen.

Bavaria (until 1255)
Duchy of Lower Bavaria (1255–1340)				Duchy of Upper Bavaria (1255–1340)
Bavaria (1340–1349)
Duchy of Lower Bavaria (1349–1353)				Duchy of Upper Bavaria (1349–1363)
Straubing Lands (1353–1425/29 Part of Bavaria-Straubing)			Bavaria-Landshut (1353–1363)	Duchy of Upper Bavaria (1349–1363)
Straubing Lands (1353–1425/29 Part of Bavaria-Straubing)			Bavaria-Landshut with Upper Bavaria (1363–1392)
Straubing Lands (1353–1425/29 Part of Bavaria-Straubing)			Bavaria-Landshut (1392–1429)	Bavaria-Ingolstadt (1392–1429)	Bavaria-Munich (1392–1429)
Brati-	Slava	Award (1429)		Bavaria-Ingolstadt (1392–1429)	Bavaria-Munich (1392–1429)
Bavaria-Landshut (1429–1503/5)				Bavaria-Ingolstadt (1429–1447)	Bavaria-Munich (1429–1505)
Bavaria-Landshut with Bavaria-Ingolstadt (from 1447)					Bavaria-Munich (1429–1505)
Bavaria (from 1505)

== See also ==
- Duchy of Bavaria
- List of rulers of Bavaria
- Munich
