= Louis VII of Bavaria =

Duke of Bavaria-Ingolstadt from 1413 (c. 1368–1447)

Louis VII
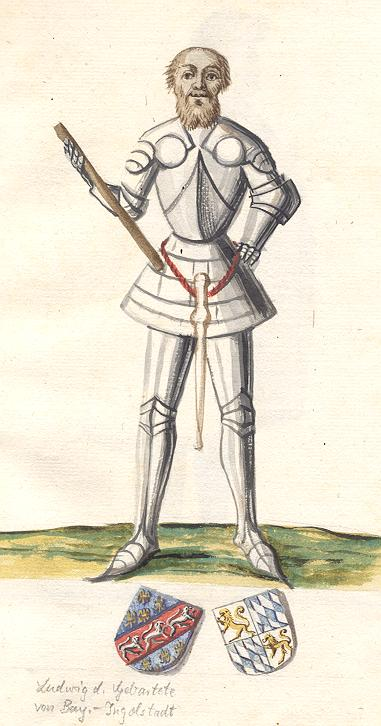
- Born: c. 1368
- Died: 1 May 1447; Burghausen
- Noble family: House of Wittelsbach
- Spouses: Anne de Bourbon-La Marche; Catherine of Alençon
- Issue: 4, including Louis VIII, Duke of Bavaria
- Father: Stephen III, Duke of Bavaria
- Mother: Taddea Visconti

Louis VII (c. 1368 – 1 May 1447), called the Bearded (German: Ludwig der Bärtige) was the Duke of Bavaria-Ingolstadt from 1413 until 1443. He was a son of Duke Stephen III and Taddea Visconti.

== Biography ==
As brother of Isabella of Bavaria-Ingolstadt, wife of Charles VI of France, he spent several years in France. When he succeeded his father in 1413 he ordered to build the New Castle of Ingolstadt, which was strongly influenced by French Gothic.

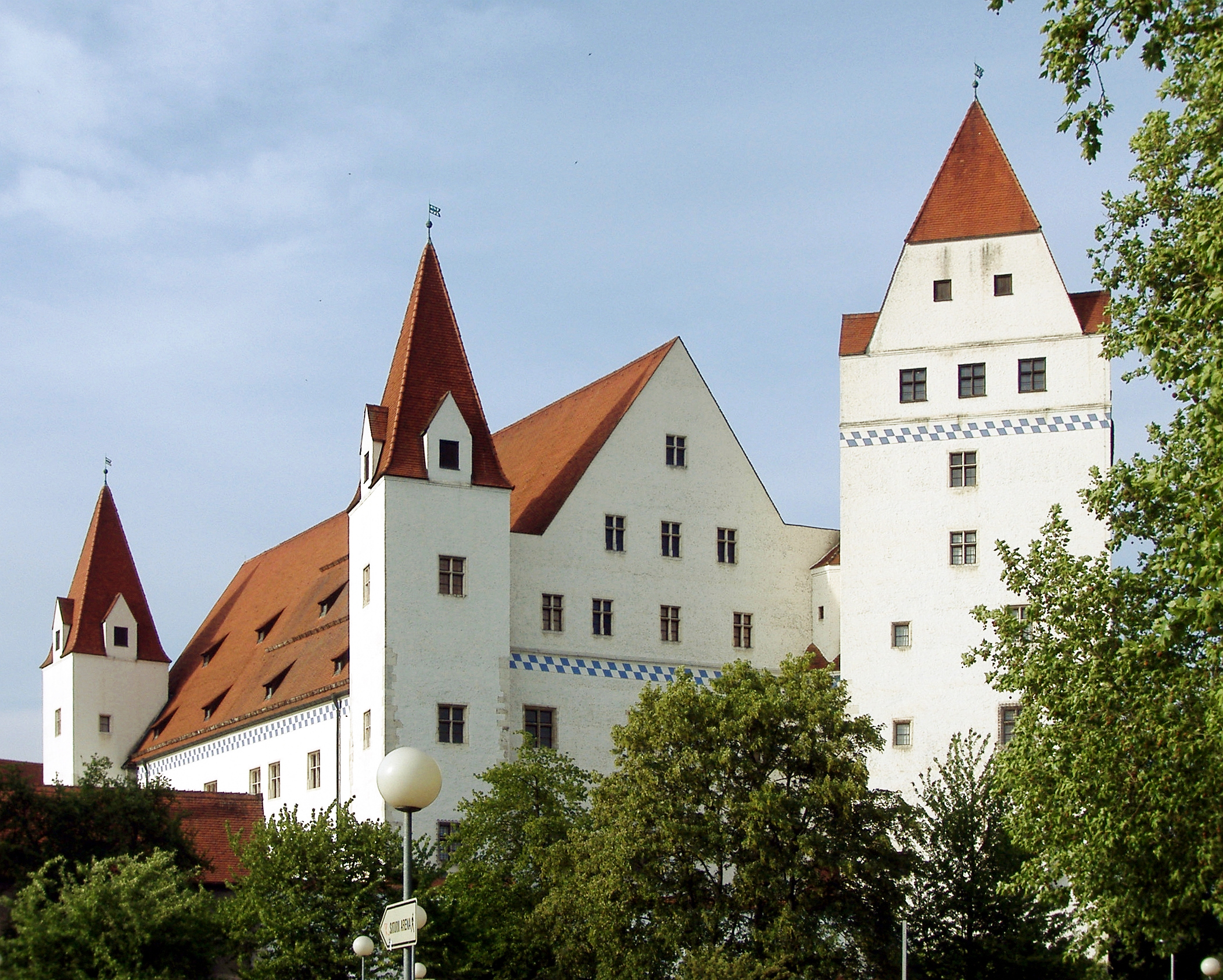
New Castle of Ingolstadt

In 1408 Louis, Duke William II of Bavaria-Straubing and Duke John the Fearless of Burgundy, defeated the citizens of Liège who revolted against William's brother John, the prince-bishop of Liège, on the field of Othée. The hot-tempered Louis was not only in conflict with his former ally John the Fearless but fought also several times against his cousin Henry XVI of Bavaria-Landshut, who had united his enemies in the Parakeet Society of 1414 and the League of Constance of 1415.

The death of John of Bavaria in 1425 caused a new conflict between Louis and his cousins Henry, Ernest and William III, Duke of Bavaria-Munich. As a result, John's duchy Bavaria-Straubing then was partitioned between the four dukes in 1429.

Finally, Louis was imprisoned in 1443 by his own son, Louis VIII, who had allied with Henry XVI. Louis died in 1447 as Henry's prisoner. Since Louis VIII had died already two years before, the duchy of Bavaria-Ingolstadt passed to Henry.

== Marriages ==
Louis married twice. His first wife was Anne de Bourbon-La Marche, a daughter of John I, Count of La Marche, whom he married on 1 October 1402. She was the widow of Jean de Berry, Count of Montpensier. She died in 1408. They had two sons:

- Louis VIII of Bavaria-Ingolstadt (1 September 1403 – 7 April 1445) and
- Johann (born 1404) who died in early infancy.

In 1413, he married secondly Catherine of Alençon, the daughter of Peter II of Alençon and Marie Chamaillart, Viscountess of Beaumont-au- Maine. They had a son:

- Johann (born 6 February 1415) and
- an unnamed daughter.

Both children died young. By various mistresses, Louis fathered several illegitimate children.

== Sources ==
- Adams, Tracy (2010). The Life and Afterlife of Isabeau of Bavaria. The Johns Hopkins University Press. ISBN 9780801899263.

Louis VII of Bavaria House of Wittelsbach Born: c. 1368 Died: 1 May 1447
Regnal titles
Preceded by Stephen III	Duke of Bavaria-Ingolstadt; 1413–1443	Succeeded by Louis VIII
