= Herenaus Haid =

Herenaus Haid was a German Roman Catholic clergyman, teacher, catechist and author.

== Life and works ==
He was born in the Diocese of Regensburg on 16 February 1784; died 7 January 1873. His parents were quite destitute, and Haid, in his earliest youth, was deprived of all schooling. He was a shepherd's boy and had learned from his pious mother only how to say the rosary and to recite the little catechism of Petrus Canisius. Despite privation and obstacles, he finished his preparatory studies at Neuburg and his theological studies at Landshut. At Munich, which diocese he entered in 1807 after his ordination, he obtained the degree of Doctor of Divinity in 1808.

But parochial work was not to be his field. His relations with Johann Michael Sailer inclined him to a literary life. It was through Sailer's intervention too that he was called to St. Gall as professor of exegesis. Here he taught from 1813 to 1818, and also acted as spiritual director in the seminary. His ability was soon recognized even at Munich, and he was called back and placed in charge of an important parish. The exasperation shown in anti-religious circles of Munich at his return is the best evidence of his apostolic zeal and energy. After much chicanery and government pressure he was relegated to a country parish (1824). But he ventured to return to the capital under Ludwig and was highly honoured by his bishop.

One of his most intimate friends, Johann Nepomuk von Ringseis, paid in his Erinnerungen ("Memories") (I, p. 113) a glowing tribute to Haid's labors as a confessor.

During the closing years of his life Haid was afflicted with almost total blindness, but he bore his affliction with the greatest resignation. When death claimed him he had almost reached his ninetieth year.

== Works ==
Among the first shorter productions of Haid's pen was a treatise Der Rosenkranz nach Meinung der kathol. Kirche ("The Rosary according to the Catholic Church") (Landshut, 1810).

His life work was the establishment of the catechism course in his church of Unsere liebe Frau (Our Lady), whereby he has merited a place in the history of catechism. The origin and growth of this foundation is described in his large work Die gesamte christliche Lehre in ihrem Zusammenhang ("the whole Christian teaching in its context") (7 volumes, Munich, 1837–45). In the preface to the seventh volume he explains the manner in which he was wont to conduct his catechizing. In his simple statements is to be found a complete theory or system of catechism.

He lays special stress on the Roman catechism and the catechism of Canisius. The deep veneration in which Haid, from his earliest youth, had held the latter found expression in his later writings, when he not only edited under different forms and translated the Summa doctrinæ christianæ of Peter Canisius, but also published some of the smaller works and a comprehensive biography of their author.

An account of a number of Haid's smaller works, not mentioned above, is to be found in the third volume of the Bucherlexikon of Christian Gottlob Kayser (Leipzig, 1835), 16.
