= Louis VIII of Bavaria =

Duke of Bavaria-Ingolstadt (1403–1445)

Louis VIII

Duke of Bavaria-Ingolstadt
- Reign: 1443–1445
- Predecessor: Louis VII
- Successor: Henry XVI
- Born: 1 September 1403; Paris, Kingdom of France
- Died: 7 April 1445 (aged 41); Ingolstadt, Bavaria-Ingolstadt
- Spouse: Margaret of Brandenburg
- House: House of Wittelsbach
- Father: Louis VII
- Mother: Anne de Bourbon

Louis VIII of Bavaria (German: Ludwig VIII der Höckrige, Louis the Hunchback) (1 September 1403 – 7 April 1445) was Duke of Bavaria-Ingolstadt from 1443 until his death. He was born in Paris, a son of Louis VII and his first wife Anne de Bourbon-La Marche, a daughter of John I, Count of La Marche. He died in 1445 at Ingolstadt.

== Biography ==
In 1416 he obtained the title of count of Graisbach. He married Margarete of Brandenburg (1410 - 27 July 1465), daughter of Frederick I of Brandenburg, on 20 July 1441. Since 1438 Louis had been feuding with his father Louis VII, who gave undue preference to another (illegitimate) son. Louis allied with Henry XVI of Bavaria-Landshut against his father, who was finally taken prisoner in 1443, but Louis VIII died two years later. When Louis VII also died in 1447, Henry finally succeeded in Bavaria-Ingolstadt.

Louis VIII of Bavaria House of Wittelsbach Born: 1 September 1403 Died: 7 April 1445
Regnal titles
Preceded by Louis VII	Duke of Bavaria-Ingolstadt; 1443–1445	Succeeded by Henry XVI
