= John II of Bavaria =

Duke of Bavaria-Munich

John II, Duke of Bavaria
- Born: 1341
- Died: 1397 (aged 55–56)
- Noble family: House of Wittelsbach
- Spouse: Catherine of Gorizia
- Issue: Ernest I of Bavaria-Munich; William III of Bavaria-Munich; Sophia, Queen of Germany
- Father: Stephen II
- Mother: Elisabeth of Sicily

Duke John II of Bavaria-Munich (1341 – 1397), (German: Johann II, Herzog von Bayern-München), since 1375 Duke of Bavaria-Munich. He was the third son of Stephen II and Elizabeth of Sicily.

== Family ==
His maternal grandparents were Frederick III of Sicily and Eleanor of Anjou. Her parents were Charles II of Naples and Maria Arpad of Hungary.

Maria was a daughter of Stephen V of Hungary and his wife, queen Elisabeth, who was daughter of Zayhan of Kuni, a chief of the Cuman tribe and had been a pagan before her marriage.

Stephen V was a son of Béla IV of Hungary and Maria Laskarina. Maria Laskarina was a daughter of Theodore I Lascaris and Anna Angelina. Anna was a daughter of Eastern Roman Emperor Alexius III and Euphrosyne Doukaina Kamaterina.

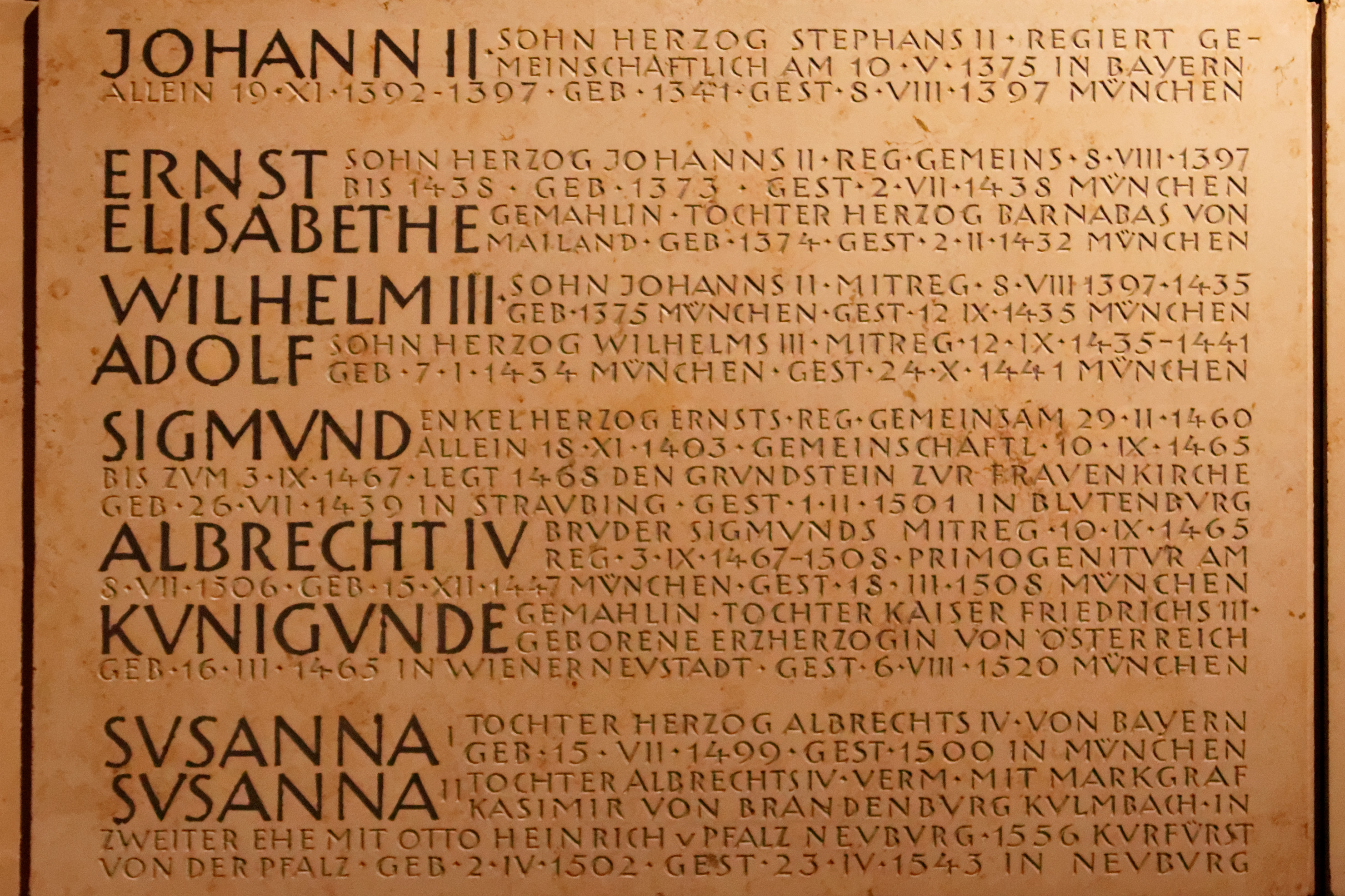
Memorial plaque to the Wittelsbacher buried in the crypt of Frauenkirche.

== Duke of Bavaria ==
From 1375 to 1392 John ruled in Bavaria-Landshut with his brothers Stephen III and Frederick. In 1385 John II and his wife inherited a third of County of Gorizia with Lienz, but already in 1392 he sold his part to the Habsburgs. In 1392 John initiated a new partition of Bavaria since he refused to finance the Italian adventures of his brothers who were both married with daughters of Bernabò Visconti but also Stephen's expensive holding of court. The duchy of Bavaria-Landshut then was reduced since Bavaria-Ingolstadt and Bavaria-Munich were created. Frederick kept Bavaria-Landshut while Stephen received Bavaria-Ingolstadt which he soon treated as a disadvantage. Therefore, John ruled Bavaria-Munich for three years only until 1395, then he shared his power again with Stephen after an armed conflict between both brothers.

John II was succeeded by his sons Ernest and William III who finally managed to enforce their sole rule over Bavaria-Munich against Stephen III. John is buried in the Frauenkirche in Munich.

== Marriage and children ==
John married in 1372 Catherine of Gorizia, a daughter of Count Meinhard VI of Gorizia and Catharina of Pfannberg. Their children were:

1. Ernest I of Bavaria-Munich (1373–2 July 1438, Munich)
2. William III of Bavaria-Munich (1375, Munich–1435, Munich).
3. Sofia of Bavaria (1376–26 September 1425, Pressburg), married in Prague 2 May 1389 King Wenceslaus.

He also had an illegitimate son, Johann Grünwalder (1393–1452), who was Cardinal and Bishop of Freising.

== Sources ==
- Thomas, Andrew L. (2010). A House Divided: Wittelsbach Confessional Court Cultures in the Holy Roman Empire, c. 1550-1650. Brill.

John II of Bavaria House of Wittelsbach Born: 1341 Died: 1397
Regnal titles
Preceded by Stephen II	Duke of Bavaria-Munich; 1375–1397	Succeeded by Ernest
