= William III of Bavaria =

Duke of Bavaria

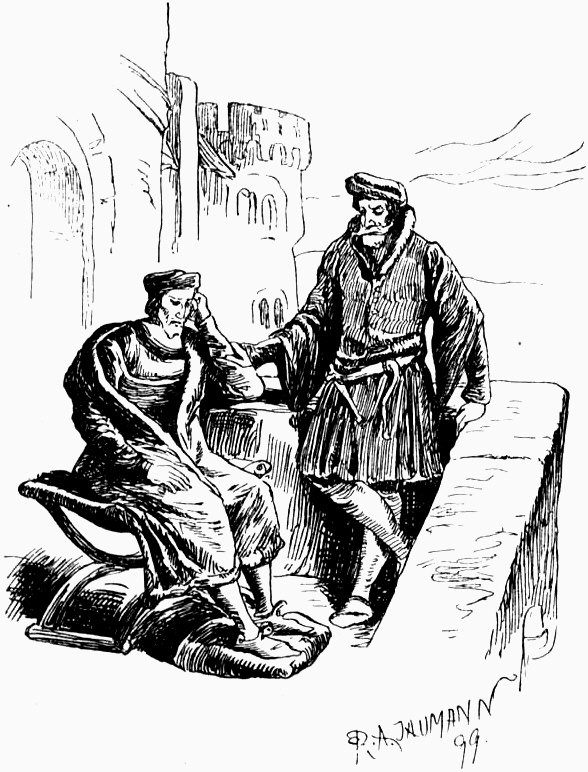
Albert III and his uncle William III.

William III (1375 – 12 September 1435; (German: Wilhelm III., Herzog von Bayern), was Duke of Bavaria-Munich (1397–1435), together and in concord with his older brother Ernest, Duke of Bavaria. William III was a son of John II and a member of the Parakeet Society.

== Biography ==
William was born in Munich.

After the extinction of the Wittelsbach dukes of Bavaria-Straubing, counts of Holland and Hainaut, William and his brother Ernest struggled with their cousins Henry and Louis but finally received half of Bavaria-Straubing in 1429.

William III supported Sigismund, Holy Roman Emperor against the Hussites and was a possible candidate for the Emperor's succession but died already in 1435. His own son (by his wife Margaret of Cleves) was Duke Adolf of Bavaria who succeeded him as a co-regent of Ernest until he died in 1441. William III is buried in the Frauenkirche in Munich.

== General bibliography ==
- Klaus von Andrian-Werburg: Urkundenwesen, Kanzlei, Rat und Regierungssystem der Herzoge Johann II., Ernst und Wilhelm III. von Bayern-München (1392–1438). Lassleben, Kallmünz 1971, ISBN 3-7847-4410-9 (Münchener historische Studien, Abteilung Geschichtliche Hilfswissenschaften, Vol. 10; dissertation, Ludwig-Maximilians-Universität München 1961).
- Karin Kaltwasser: Herzog und Adel in Bayern-Landshut unter Heinrich XVI. dem Reichen (1393–1450). Dissertation, University of Regensburg 2004.
- August Kluckhohn: Herzog Wilhelm III. von Bayern, der Protector des Baseler Konzils und Statthalter des Kaisers Sigmund. In: Forschungen zur deutschen Geschichte. Vol. 2, 1862, pp. 519–615.
- Christoph Kutter: Die Münchener Herzöge und ihre Vasallen. Die Lehenbücher der Herzöge von Oberbayern-München im 15. Jahrhundert. Ein Beitrag zur Geschichte des Lehnswesens. Dissertation, Ludwig-Maximilians-Universität München 1993.
- Sigmund Ritter von Riezler: Wilhelm III., Herzog von Baiern-München. In: Allgemeine Deutsche Biographie (ADB). Vol. 42, Duncker & Humblot, Leipzig 1897, pp. 703–705 (online).
- Theodor Straub: Bayern im Zeichen der Teilungen und Teilherzogtümer. In: Max Spindler, Andreas Kraus (eds.): Handbuch der bayerischen Geschichte. 2nd edition. Vol. 2, C. H. Beck, Munich 1988, ISBN 3-406-32320-0, pp. 196–287, especially 248–249.

William III of Bavaria House of Wittelsbach Born: 1375 Died: 12 September 1435
Regnal titles
Preceded by John II	Duke of Bavaria-Munich; 1397–1435	Succeeded by Ernest
Preceded by John III	Duke of Bavaria-Straubing; 1429–1435	Succeeded by Ernest
