= Frederick, Duke of Bavaria =

Duke of Bavaria from 1375 (1339–1393)

- Born: 1339
- Died: 4 December 1393 (aged 53–54); České Budějovice
- Noble family: House of Wittelsbach
- Spouses: Anna of Neuffen; Maddalena Visconti
- Issue: Elisabeth; Henry XVI the Rich; John; Elisabeth; Margareta; Magdalene
- Father: Stephen II, Duke of Bavaria
- Mother: Elisabeth of Sicily

Frederick (1339 – 4 December 1393) was Duke of Bavaria from 1375. He was the second son of Stephen II and Elizabeth of Sicily.

== Reign ==
From 1375 to 1392 he ruled Bavaria-Landshut jointly with his brothers Stephen III and John II and managed to administer the richest part of the duchy, the region of Landshut which he also kept after the division of Bavaria among the brothers in 1392, when Bavaria-Landshut was reduced since Bavaria-Ingolstadt and Bavaria-Munich were created for his brothers.

In 1383 Frederick fought on the French side in Flanders against the English. He visited his uncle Albert I of Straubing-Holland in Quesnoy and participated in the siege of Bourbourg. On 1 November he went for an annual pension of 4000 francs in Paris in the service of King Charles VI, whose marriage to his niece Elizabeth he ran significantly. In the summer of 1385 he accompanied Elizabeth - later named Isabeau de Bavaria - to Amiens for her marriage with the King.

In 1387 Frederick imprisoned the archbishop of Salzburg to force him to finish his alliance with a confederation of cities in Swabia. Frederick was an advisor of King Wenceslaus of Bohemia in legal affairs and a favorable candidate for the king's succession when he died in 1393 at Budweis, South Bohemia. He was succeeded in Bavaria-Landshut by his son Henry.

== Family and children ==
He was married twice. First, 1360 to Anna of Neuffen, daughter of Berthold VII of Neuffen. In this marriage he had only a daughter, Elisabeth (Isabella) (1361 – 17 January 1382), married to Marco Visconti, Lord of Parma.

Secondly, he was married on 2 September 1381 to Maddalena Visconti, daughter of Bernabò Visconti and Beatrice Regina della Scala. Their children were:

1. Henry XVI the Rich (1386–1450).
2. John, died young.
3. Elizabeth (1383 – 13 November 1442, Ansbach), married to Frederick I, Margrave of Brandenburg.
4. Margareta (b. 1384), died young.
5. Magdalene (1388–1410), married in 1404 to Count John Meinhard VII, Count of Gorizia.

Frederick, Duke of Bavaria House of Wittelsbach Born: 1339 Died: 4 December 1393
Regnal titles
Preceded by Stephen II	Duke of Bavaria-Landshut; 1375–1393	Succeeded by Henry XVI the Rich
