= Bavaria-Landshut =

Duchy in the Holy Roman Empire

Coordinates: 48°32′N 12°09′E

Duchy of Bavaria-Landshut Herzogtuom Baiern-Landshut (Middle High German)
- 1353–1503
- Banner of Bavaria-Landshut

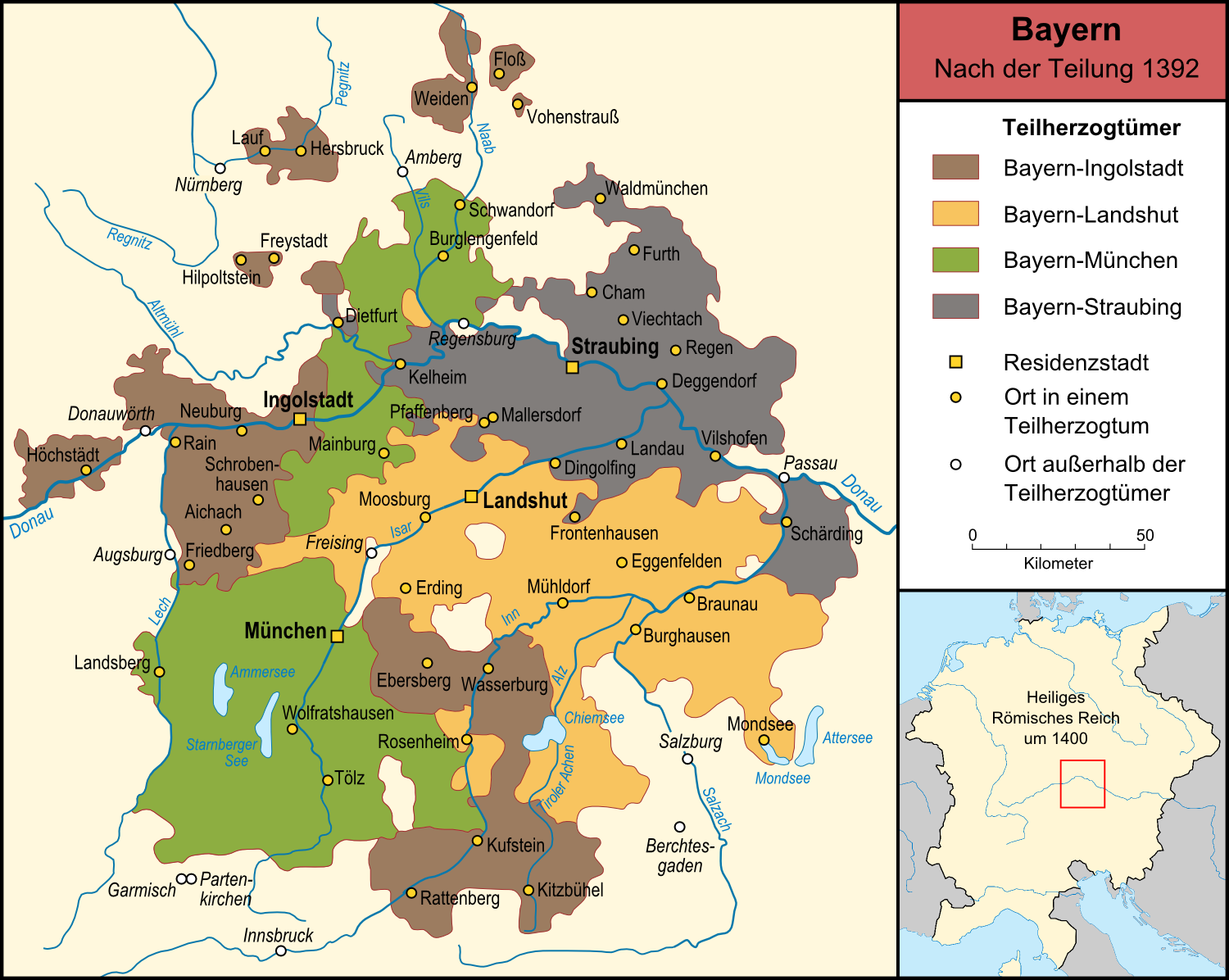
- Bavaria-Landshut (orange), with Bavaria-Munich (green), Bavaria-Ingolstadt (brown) and Bavaria-Straubing (grey) after the division of 1392
- Status: Duchy
- Capital: Landshut
- Government: Monarchy
- Duke of Bavaria-Landshut
  - 1353–1375: Stephen III, John II, and Frederick
  - 1375–1393: Frederick
  - 1393–1450: Henry XVI
  - 1450–1479: Louis IX
  - 1479–1503: George
- Historical era: Middle Ages
  - Established: 3 June 1353
  - Bavaria-Munich and Bavaria-Ingolstadt split off: 1392
  - Annexed Bavaria-Ingolstadt: 1447
  - Landshut War of Succession begins: 1503
Preceded by
Duchy of Bavaria
Succeeded by
Bavaria-Munich
Palatinate-Neuburg
County of Tyrol

Bavaria-Landshut (Middle High German: Baiern-Landshut) was a duchy of the Holy Roman Empire that existed from 1353 to 1503. It was established as a result of the division of the Duchy of Bavaria among the Wittelsbach dukes and was centered on the city of Landshut.

The duchy underwent several territorial changes during its existence, including the division of Bavaria in 1392 and the incorporation of Bavaria-Ingolstadt in 1447. Bavaria-Landshut reached its greatest extent under Louis IX, Duke of Bavaria and George, Duke of Bavaria. Following George's death without a male heir in 1503, the Landshut War of Succession resulted in the division of his territories among the other branches of the House of Wittelsbach.

== History ==
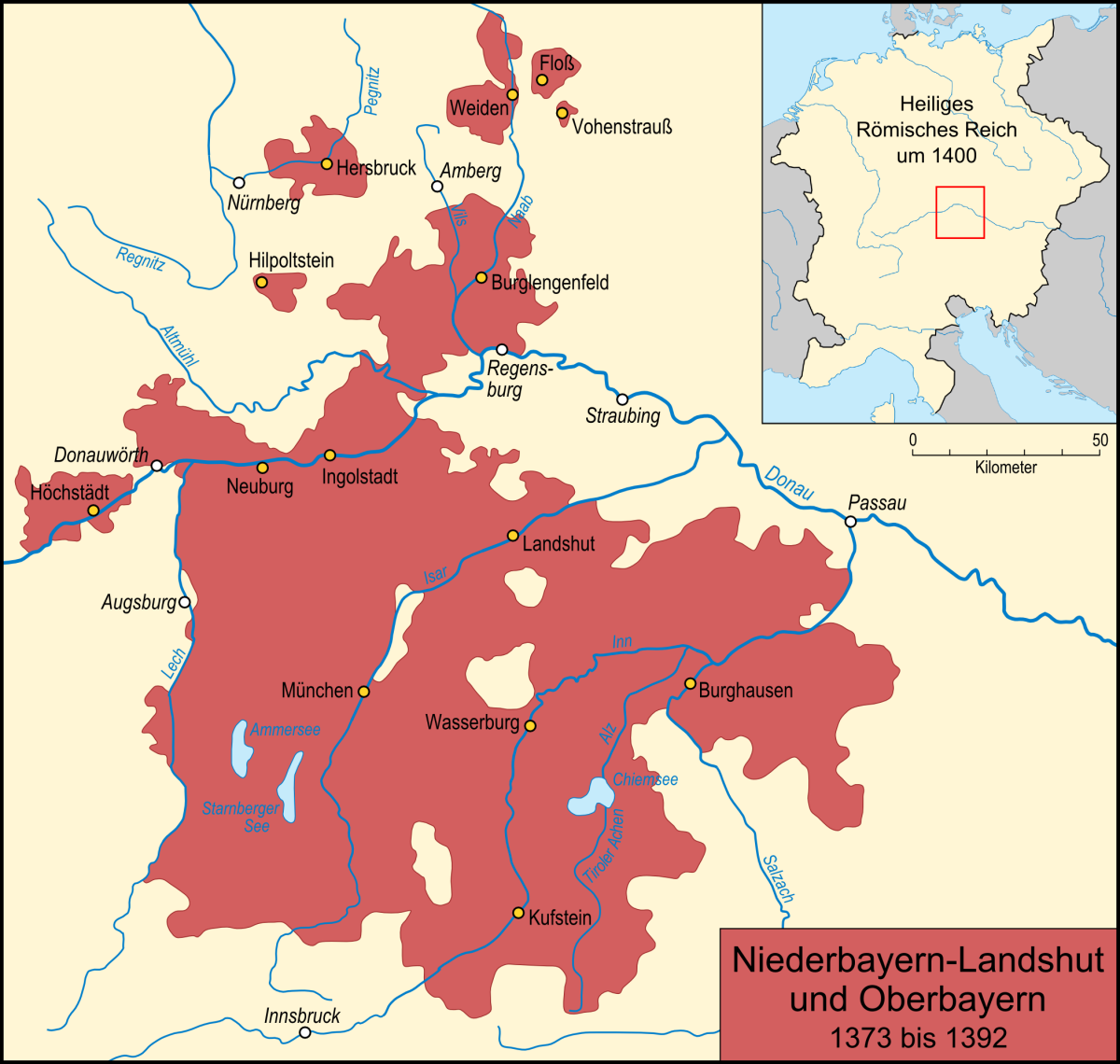
The larger Duchy of Bavaria-Landshut between 1363 and 1392 (includes Munich and Ingolstadt but not Straubing)

The creation of the duchy was the result of the death of Emperor Louis IV the Bavarian. In the Treaty of Landsberg 1349, which divided up Louis's empire, his sons Stephen, William, and Albert were to receive jointly Lower Bavaria and the Netherlands. Four years later the inheritance was divided again in the Treaty of Regensburg 1353; Stephen received the new Duchy of Bavaria-Landshut. In 1363 Stephen became also Duke of Upper Bavaria which was then re-united with Bavaria-Landshut. After Stephen's death his three sons ruled the duchy jointly. But in 1392 Bavaria-Landshut was divided for the three dukes and so Bavaria-Munich and Bavaria-Ingolstadt were split off.

In 1429 parts of Bavaria-Straubing were united with Bavaria-Landshut, as was the entire Duchy of Bavaria-Ingolstadt in 1447. Bavaria-Landshut was then the richest part of Bavaria, also due to the mining in Rattenberg and Kitzbühel and the most modern administration. The seat of the dukes was the Trausnitz Castle in Landshut until 1475, when they moved to the second residence at Burghausen Castle.

The duchy lasted overall 150 years until the death of Georg the Rich triggered the Landshut War of Succession. At the war's end in 1505, the land was divided between the newly created Duchy of Palatinate-Neuburg and Bavaria-Munich. Kufstein and Kitzbühel were ceded to Maximilian I, Holy Roman Emperor as compensation for his support to Bavaria-Munich and then united with Tyrol.
