= Bavaria-Ingolstadt =

Duchy in the Holy Roman Empire

Coordinates: 48°45′N 11°25′E

Sub-duchy of Bavaria-Ingolstadt Teilherzogtuom Baiern-Ingolstat (Middle High German)
- 1392–1447
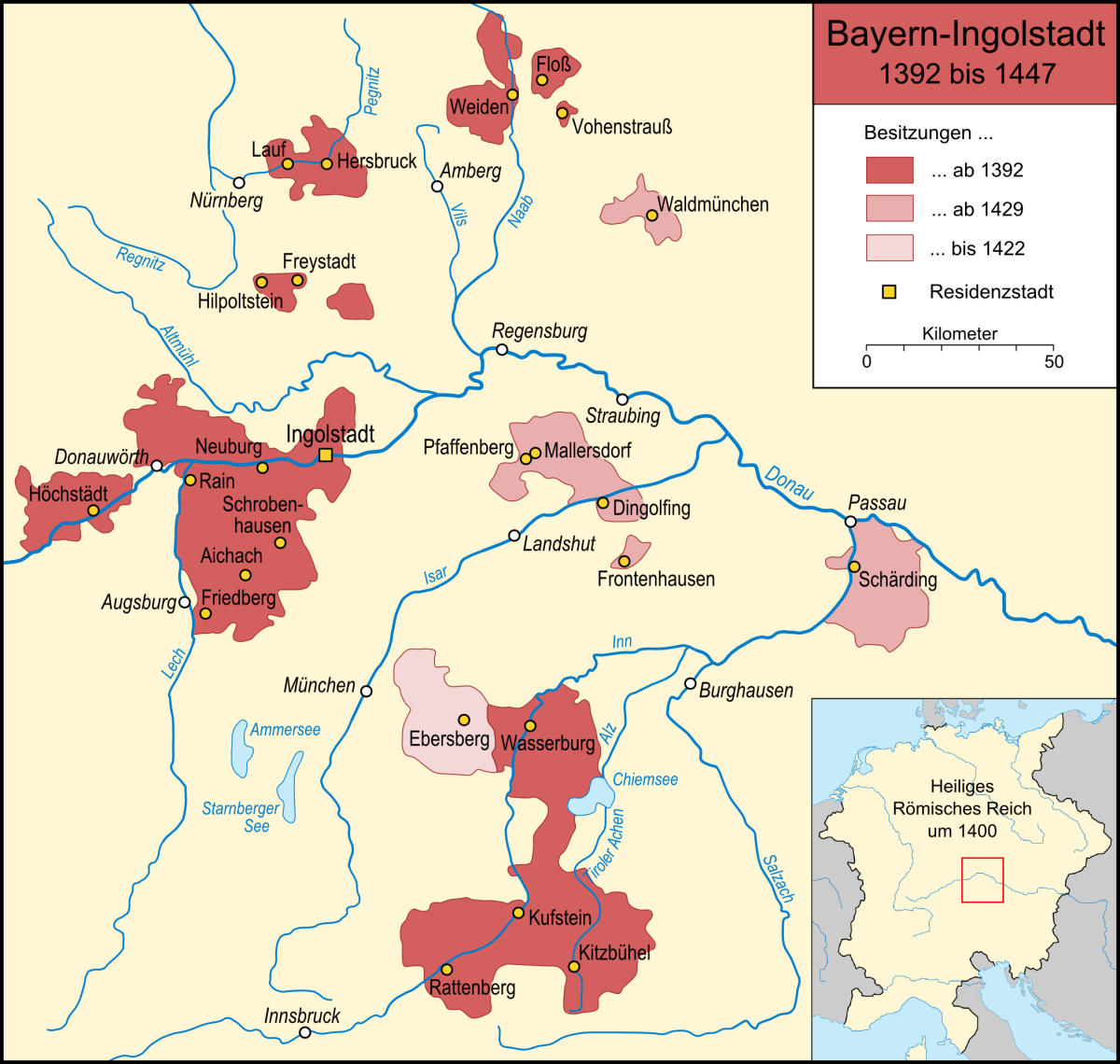
- The Duchy of Bavaria-Ingolstadt (1392–1447)
- Status: Duchy
- Capital: Ingolstadt
- Government: Monarchy
- Duke of Bavaria-Ingolstadt
  - 1392–1413: Stephan III
  - 1413–1447: Louis VII
  - 1443–1445: Louis VIII
- Historical era: Middle Ages
  - Division of Bavaria-Landshut: 1392
  - Louis VII captured by his cousin, Henry XVI, duke of Bavaria-Landshut: 1443
  - Annexed by Bavaria-Landshut: 1447
Preceded by	Succeeded by
Bavaria-Landshut	Bavaria-Landshut

Bavaria-Ingolstadt (German: Bayern-Ingolstadt or Oberbayern-Ingolstadt) was a sub-duchy which was part of the Holy Roman Empire from 1392 to 1447.

== History ==
After the death of Stephen II in 1375, his sons Stephen III, Frederick, and John II jointly ruled Bavaria-Landshut. After seventeen years, the brothers decided to formally divide their inheritance. Eldest son Stephen received Bavaria-Ingolstadt, Frederick kept what remained of Bavaria-Landshut while the youngest son John received Bavaria-Munich.

After Stephen's death in 1413, his son Louis VII assumed his father's throne. After the Bavarian war between Louis and Henry XVI, duke of Bavaria-Landshut, in 1429 parts of Bavaria-Straubing were united with Bavaria-Ingolstadt. Louis reigned until his own son, Louis VIII, usurped his throne in 1443 and delivered him to their enemy, Henry XVI. Louis VIII died two years later. Louis VII died in captivity. With no heir, Bavaria-Ingolstadt was returned to Bavaria-Landshut. The ambitions of Henry's successor Louis IX would led to another Bavarian war against Albrecht III Achilles of Brandenburg.

== Geography ==
Bavaria-Ingolstadt was cobbled together from diverse, non-contiguous territories in Bavaria. The capital was Ingolstadt and included the territories around it: Schrobenhausen, Aichach, Friedberg, Rain am Lech and Höchstädt an der Donau. In addition, Bavaria Ingolstadt incorporated the following towns:

Southern Bavaria:

- Wasserburg am Inn
- Ebersberg
- Kufstein
- Kitzbühel
- Rattenberg

Eastern Bavaria:

- Schärding
- Dingolfing
- Mallersdorf and Pfaffenberg

Northern Bavaria:

- Hilpoltstein
- Hersbruck
- Lauf an der Pegnitz
- Weiden in der Oberpfalz
- Waldmünchen
