= Bavaria-Straubing =

Duchy part of the Holy Roman Empire

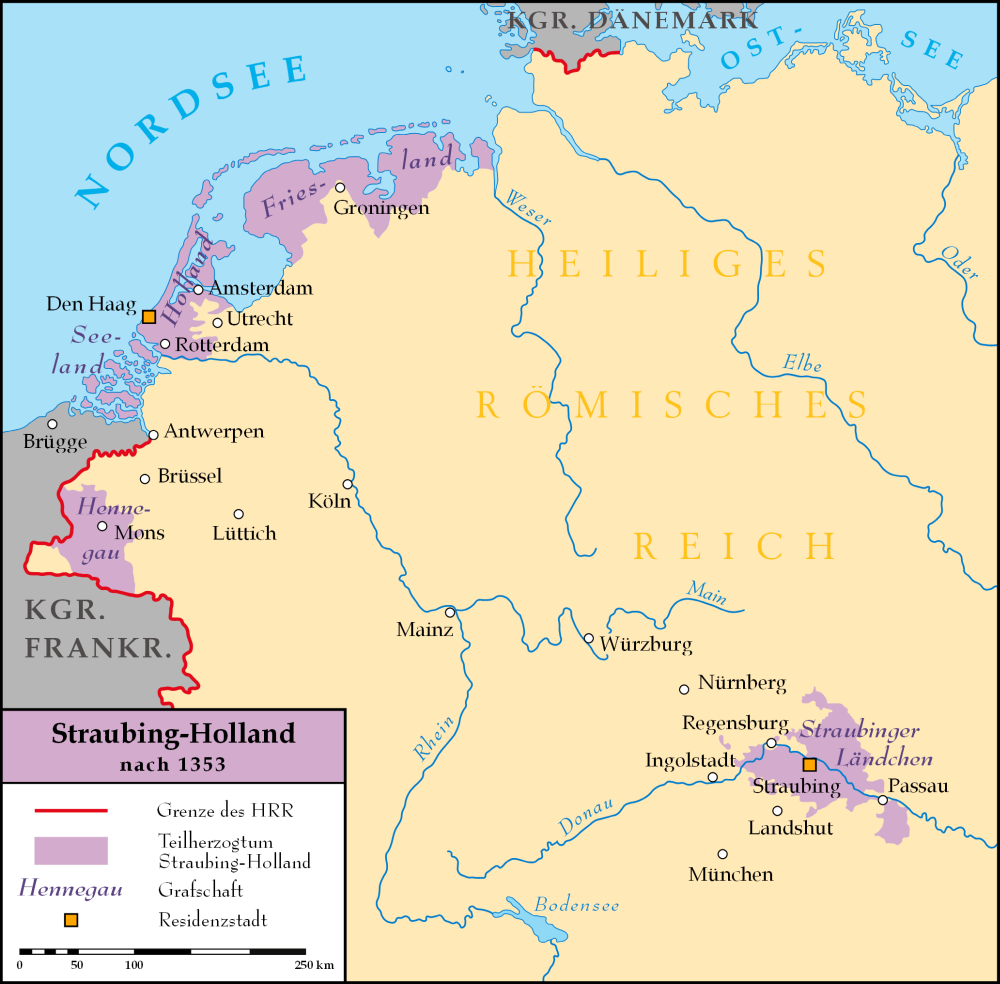
Scattered lands of Bavaria-Straubing, 1353-1432

Coat of Arms of the Dukes of Bavaria-Straubing-Holland

Bavaria-Straubing denotes the widely scattered territorial inheritance in the Wittelsbach house of Bavaria that were governed by independent dukes of Bavaria-Straubing between 1353 and 1432; a map (illustration) of these marches and outliers of the Holy Roman Empire, demonstrates the fractionalisation of lands where primogeniture did not obtain.

In 1255 the Duchy of Bavaria had been divided into Upper and Lower Bavaria. The two parts were reunited in 1340 but in 1349, after Emperor Louis IV's death, his sons re-divided Bavaria: Lower Bavaria passed to Stephan II (died 1375), William (died 1389) and Albert (died 1404). In 1353, by the Treaty of Regensburg, Lower Bavaria was further partitioned into Bavaria-Landshut and Bavaria-Straubing: William and Albert received a part of the Lower Bavarian inheritance, with a capital in Straubing and rights to Hainaut and Holland. (Note: Stephan II received the rest of Lower Bavaria. Jacqueline never ruled Bavaria. She bore the title, but women could not rule in Bavaria. She did rule in Holland and Hainault. Her uncle Johann succeeded her father Wilhelm in Bavaria-Straubing, and was the last ruler of his branch.) Thus the dukes of Bavaria-Straubing were also counts of Hainaut, Holland and Zeeland.

In 1425, with the death of Duke John III, the Straubing dukes became extinct in the male line. His possessions were partitioned between the Dukes of Bavaria-Munich, Bavaria-Landshut and Bavaria-Ingolstadt in 1429 under arbitration of the emperor. His niece Jacqueline became Countess of Hainaut in her own right.

== Dukes of Bavaria-Straubing ==
- Jointly held by William I and Albert I 1347-1388
- Albert I "of Holland" 1388-1404
- Albert II 1389-1397 jointly held with Albert I
- William II 1404-1417
- John III 1418-1425 disputed with
- Jacqueline, Countess of Hainaut 1417-1432

After the succession struggle between Jacqueline and her uncle John, Bavaria-Straubing was divided between Bavaria-Ingolstadt, Bavaria-Landshut, and Bavaria-Munich.

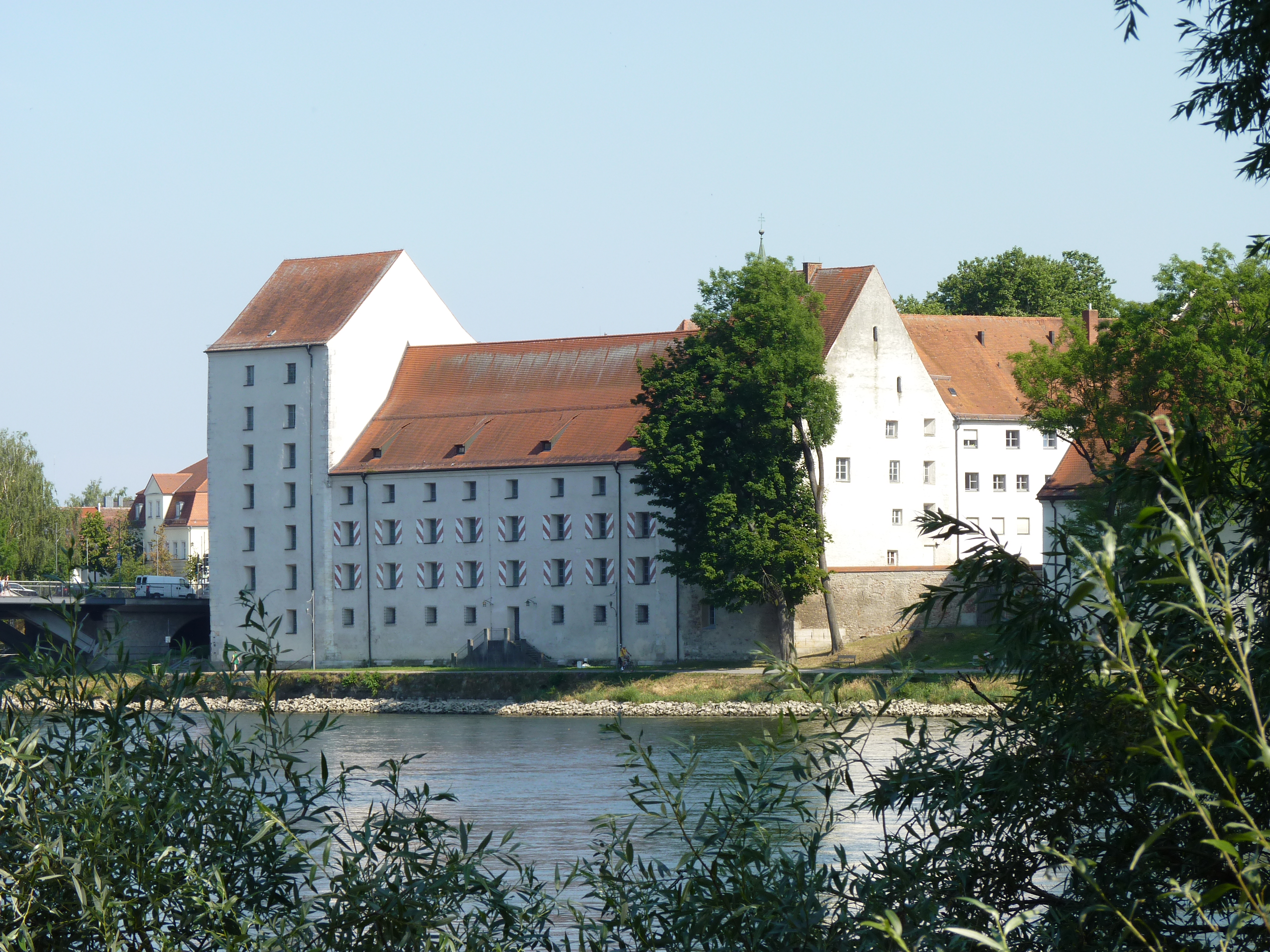
Straubing Castle, Bavaria

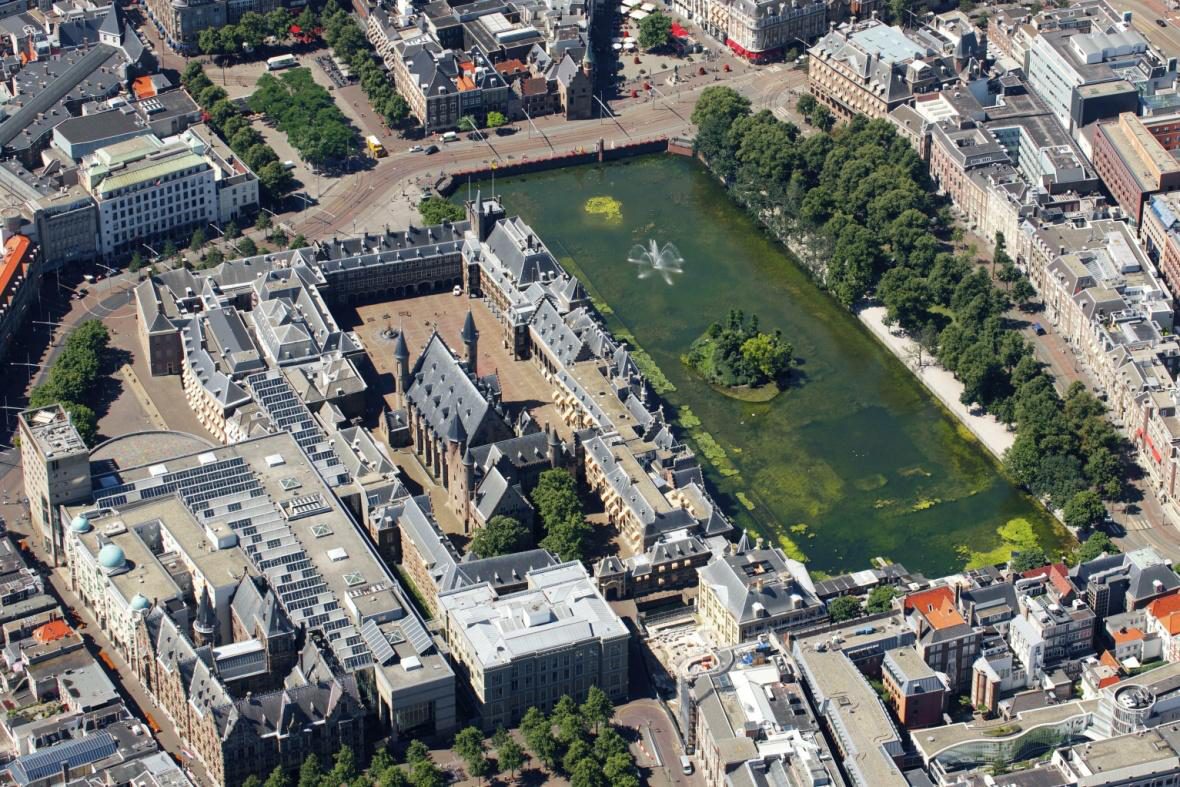
Binnenhof, Den Haag, Holland

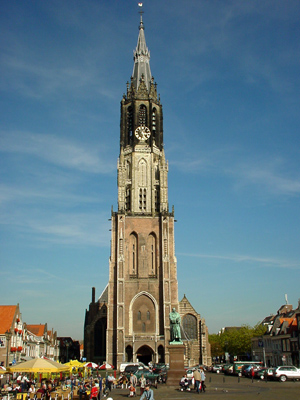
Nieuwe Kerk (Delft), built under the rule of Albert I, Duke of Bavaria-Straubing-Holland
