= Mary of France =

Mary of France may refer to:

== People ==
- Marie de France, medieval poet
- Marie of France, Duchess of Brabant (1198–1224), daughter of Philip II of France
- Marie of France, Countess of Champagne (1145–1198), daughter of Louis VII of France, wife of Henry I of Champagne
- Marie of France (1326-1341), daughter of Charles IV of France
- Marie of France, Duchess of Bar (1344–1404), daughter of John II of France, wife of Robert I of Bar
- Marie of Valois, Prioress of Poissy (1393–1438), daughter of Charles VI of France
- Marie de Valois (1444–1473), natural daughter of Charles VII of France
- Marie of Anjou (1404–1463), queen consort of Charles VII of France
- Mary Tudor, Queen of France (1496–1533), queen consort of Louis XII of France
- Mary, Queen of Scots, (1542–1587) queen consort of Francis II of France

== Other ==
- Mary, Queen of France (novel), a novel by Jean Plaidy

== See also ==
- Marie of Valois (disambiguation)
