= Stefan III =

Stefan III may refer to:

- Stefan III Branković (c. 1417 – 1476)
- Ştefan III of Moldavia (1433–1504)
- Stephen III, Duke of Bavaria (1337-1413)
