= Elizabeth of Sicily =

Elizabeth of Sicily or Elisabeth of Sicily may refer to:

- Elizabeth of Sicily, Queen of Hungary (1261–1303)
- Elisabeth of Sicily, Duchess of Bavaria (1310–1349)
