= Marie of Valois =

Marie of Valois may refer to:

- Marie of Valois, Duchess of Calabria (1309–1332), the eldest daughter of Charles of Valois to his third wife Mahaut of Châtillon.
- Marie of France, Duchess of Bar (1344–1404), or Marie of Valois, the sixth child and second daughter of John II of France and Bonne of Bohemia
- Marie of Valois, Prioress of Poissy (1393–1438), daughter of Charles VI of France and Isabeau of Bavaria
- Marie de Valois (1444–1473), natural daughter of Charles VII of France

== See also ==
- Mary of France (disambiguation)
