= Histoire secrete d'Isabelle de Baviere, reine de France =

1813 novel by Marquis de Sade

Histoire secrète d'Isabelle de Bavière, reine de France, a novel written in 1813 by the Marquis de Sade (d. 1814), was not published until 1953. Its inception is recounted in a note at the end of the manuscript. In July 1764 Sade set out from Paris for Dijon, to see documents from the time of Charles VI of France at the Carthusian convent (including the Duke of Burgundy's will and the confession of Boisbourdon, Isabelle's favourite), which he alleges were destroyed later at the time of the French Revolution. Its central character is Isabelle herself (Isabeau of Bavaria, d. 1435), wife of Charles VI, used by Sade to create a woman who is beautiful, evil and cruel. She has similarities to Juliette and possibly acts as a prototype of Sade's later, most perverted characters.

== Sources ==
- Recent Developments in Research on the Marquis de Sade, by Hobart Ryland – The French Review 1951
- Novel Reader, Fiction Writer, by Georges May – Yale French Studies 1965
