= Elisabeth of Sicily, Duchess of Bavaria =

Duchess consort of Bavaria (1310–1349)

Elisabeth of Sicily

Duchess consort of Bavaria
- Tenure: 1328 – c. 1349
- Born: 1310
- Died: 21 March 1349 (aged 38–39); Landshut
- Spouse: Stephen II, Duke of Bavaria
- Issue: Stephen III, Duke of Bavaria; Frederick, Duke of Bavaria; John II, Duke of Bavaria; Agnes, Queen of Cyprus
- House: House of Barcelona
- Father: Frederick III of Sicily
- Mother: Eleanor of Anjou

Elisabeth of Sicily (1310 – 21 March 1349) was the daughter of Frederick III of Sicily and Eleanor of Anjou. Her siblings included Peter II of Sicily and Manfred of Athens.

== Marriage and issue ==
On 27 June 1328 Elisabeth married Stephen II, Duke of Bavaria, son of Louis IV, Holy Roman Emperor and Beatrix of Silesia-Glogau. The couple had three sons and a daughter, they were:

1. Stephen III of Bavaria-Ingolstadt (1337–26 September 1413, Niederschönfeld).
2. Frederick of Bavaria-Landshut (1339–4 December 1393, Budweis).
3. John II of Bavaria-Munich (1341–1397), married Katharina of Görz
4. Agnes (b. 1338), married c. 1356 King James I of Cyprus.

Elisabeth died in 1349, her husband later married Margarete of Nuremberg; they had no children.

== Descendants ==
Two of her sons became Dukes of Bavaria and her daughter, Agnes, became Queen of Cyprus by her marriage to James I of Cyprus. Her granddaughter and namesake was Isabeau of Bavaria, queen of France by her marriage to Charles VI of France. Isabeau's children included: Isabella, Queen of England; Catherine, also queen of England; Michelle, duchess of Burgundy and Charles VII of France.

== Ancestry ==
Ancestors of Elisabeth of Sicily, Duchess of Bavaria

16. Peter II of Aragon
8. James I of Aragon
17. Maria of Montpellier
4. Peter III of Aragon
18. Andrew II of Hungary
9. Violant of Hungary
19. Yolande de Courtenay
2. Frederick II of Sicily
20. Frederick II, Holy Roman Emperor
10. Manfred of Sicily
21. Bianca Lancia
5. Constance II of Sicily
22. Amadeus IV of Savoy
11. Beatrice of Savoy
23. Marguerite of Burgundy
1. Elisabeth of Sicily
24. Louis VIII of France
12. Charles I of Naples
25. Blanche of Castile
6. Charles II of Naples
26. Ramon Berenguer IV of Provence
13. Beatrice of Provence
27. Beatrice of Savoy
3. Eleanor of Anjou
28. Béla IV of Hungary
14. Stephen V of Hungary
29. Maria Laskarina
7. Mary of Hungary
30. Köten (?)
15. Elizabeth the Cuman

== Sources ==
- Dahlem, Andreas (2012). "Late Fifteenth Century Architectural Manifestations of Ducal Authority in the Vicinity of Munich". In Anderson, Emily-Jan; Farquhar, Jill; Richards, John (eds.). Visible Exports / Imports: New Research on Medieval and Renaissance European Art and Culture. Cambridge Scholars Publishing. pp. 239–260.
- Thomas, Andrew L. (2010). A House Divided: Wittelsbach Confessional Court Cultures in the Holy Roman Empire, c.1550-1650. Brill.

Elisabeth of Sicily, Duchess of Bavaria House of Barcelona Born: 1310 Died: 1349
Royal titles
Preceded by Margaret, Countess of Tyrol	Duchess consort of Bavaria; 1328 – c. 1349	Succeeded by Margarete of Nuremberg
