= Marie of Valois, Prioress of Poissy =

French royal and prioress (1393–1438)

Marie of Valois
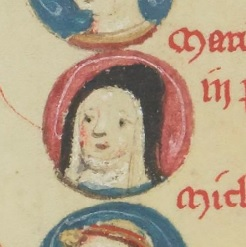
- Born: 24 August 1393; Bois de Vincennes, Paris, France
- Died: 19 August 1438 (aged 44); Palais Royal, Paris, France
- House: Valois
- Father: Charles VI of France
- Mother: Isabeau of Bavaria
- Religion: Roman Catholic

Marie of Valois or of France (24 August 1393 – 19 August 1438) was a medieval nun and prioress, born a princess of France from the House of Valois as the daughter of King Charles VI of France.

== Life ==
=== Early life ===
Marie was born at the royal residence of the Château de Vincennes as the sixth child and fourth daughter of Charles VI of France (1368–1422) and his wife, Isabeau of Bavaria (c. 1370–1435). Only three of her five older siblings were still alive at the time of her birth: Isabella, aged 3, Joan, aged 2, and Charles, Dauphin of France, aged 1, but six more children were born to her parents after Marie, five of whom survived to adulthood.

Marie's father seems to have suffered from a hereditary mental disorder. Isabeau decided to dedicate Marie to the service of God, possibly because she saw her husband's apparent madness as divine punishment. She was sent the convent of Poissy at the age of 4 on 8 September 1397. The prioress there was her grandaunt, Marie of Bourbon (1347–1401), sister of her paternal grandmother, Joanna of Bourbon, Queen consort of France.

With Marie, a companion was also sent to Poissy: Marie du Castel, daughter of poet and author Christine de Pizan. Pizan described a visit to the convent from 1400 in her work "Le Livre du dit de Poissy" ("The Book of Poissy"). She was greeted "joyously and tenderly" by the seven-year-old princess, whose lodgings were befitting for her rank.

=== Adult life ===
In 1405, when she was twelve years old, her mother Queen Isabeau and her paternal uncle Louis I, Duke of Orléans visited her to try and convince her to abandon religious life and marry twenty-eight-years-old Edward, Marquis of Pont-à-Mousson (1377–1415), oldest living son and heir of Robert, Duke of Bar, who was an ally of the duke and first cousin to her father. She refused to do this, saying that only the king, who was at the time mentally unstable, had the power to force her to marry. Remaining at the convent, she took her final vows on 26 May 1408 and spent her life there. Later, she became the prioress of the convent. Marie died of bubonic plague on 19 August 1438, a few days short of her forty-fifth birthday and was buried at the convent.

== Ancestry ==
Ancestors of Marie of Valois

16. Philip VI of France
8. John II of France
17. Joan of Burgundy
4. Charles V of France
18. John of Luxembourg, King of Bohemia
9. Bonne of Luxembourg and Bohemia
19. Elisabeth of Bohemia
2. Charles VI of France
20. Louis I, Duke of Bourbon
10. Peter I, Duke of Bourbon
21. Mary of Avesnes
5. Jeanne of Bourbon
22. Charles of Valois
11. Isabelle of Valois
23. Mahaut of Châtillon
1. Marie of Valois
24. Louis IV, Holy Roman Emperor
12. Stephen II, Duke of Bavaria
25. Beatrix of Silesia-Glogau
6. Stephen III, Duke of Bavaria
26. Frederick III of Sicily
13. Elisabeth of Sicily
27. Eleanor of Anjou
3. Isabella of Bavaria-Ingolstadt
28. Stefano Visconti
14. Bernabò Visconti
29. Valentina Doria
7. Taddea Visconti
30. Mastino II della Scala
15. Beatrice Regina della Scala
31. Taddea da Carrara
