= Tracy Adams =

Medieval historian

- Occupations: Author; professor

Academic background
- Education: University of Minnesota (BA); University of Texas (MA); University of Geneva; Johns Hopkins University (PhD)
- Thesis: Motus and Permutatio: An Anthropology of Love in the Twelfth Century Romance (1998)

Academic work
- Discipline: Historian
- Sub-discipline: Medieval History
- Institutions: University of Maryland, University College; University of Auckland
- Main interests: Isabeau of Bavaria
- Notable works: The Life and Afterlife of Isabeau of Bavaria

Tracy Adams is a medieval historian who teaches in New Zealand. A scholar of Medieval French and English literature and feminist theory, she is best known for her work on Isabeau of Bavaria.

== Career ==
Adams received her BA in English (minoring in French) from the University of Minnesota (1981), followed by an MA in English from the University of Texas (1984). From 1995 to 1996 she studied French and Latin medieval literature at the University of Geneva, and returned to the US for a PhD in French at Johns Hopkins University, which she earned in 1998 with a dissertation on love in romance, "Motus and Permutatio: An Anthropology of Love in the Twelfth Century Romance". She taught at the University of Maryland, University College, on the Schwäbisch Gmünd campus (1997–2001), and in 2001 was hired by the University of Auckland, New Zealand, as a lecturer in French. As of 2011 she is an associate professor in the School of Culture, Languages and Linguistics, and has served a number of times as head of French.

== Research ==
Adams has published on medieval conceptions of love, and is best known for her 2010 book The Life and Afterlife of Isabeau of Bavaria (Johns Hopkins, 2010), which was well-received as a "a thought-provoking study" and a valuable attempt to recuperate the reputation of Isabeau of Bavaria, whose reputation as "overweight, wasteful, empty-headed, promiscuous" had suffered from gossip and a neglect of actual primary material, despite having been portrayed as a "regent" by Christine de Pizan, as Adams had argued in an earlier article.
