= Michelle of Valois =

Duchess consort of Burgundy from 1419 to 1422

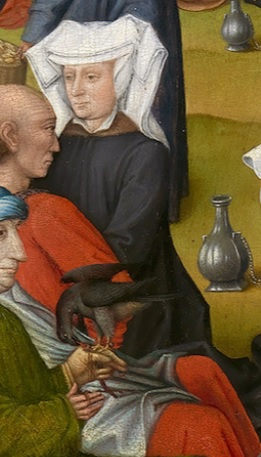
- Portrait of Michelle by Rogier van der Weyden, late 15th century

Duchess consort of Burgundy
- Tenure: 10 September 1419 – 8 July 1422
- Born: 11 January 1395
- Died: 8 July 1422 (aged 27); Ghent, County of Flanders, Kingdom of France
- Burial: Saint Bavo's Cathedral, Ghent
- Spouse: Philip III, Duke of Burgundy (m. 1409)
- Issue: Agnes of Burgundy
- House: Valois
- Father: Charles VI of France
- Mother: Isabeau of Bavaria

Michelle of France (11 January 1395 – 8 July 1422), also called Michelle of Valois, was Duchess consort of Burgundy as the first wife of Philip III, Duke of Burgundy, called "Philip the Good". She was born a princess of France as the daughter of Charles VI, King of France and Isabeau of Bavaria.

== Life ==
=== Early life ===
Michelle was born on 11 January 1395 as the seventh child and fifth daughter of Charles VI, King of France and Isabeau/Isabelle of Bavaria. She was named for Saint Michael the Archangel after her father noted an improvement in his health after a pilgrimage to Mont Saint-Michel in 1393. The children of the royal family were raised with great care. Their mother purchased luxurious toys, clothes and gifts for them, and regularly corresponded with them when they were apart. During pandemics, she ensured they were sent to safety in the countryside.

=== Marriage ===
In June 1409, at the age of 14, Michelle married 13-year-old Philip, Count of Charolais, son and heir of John the Fearless, Duke of Burgundy. They had probably been engaged on 28 January 1405, at the age of 10 and 8, respectively. Michelle and Philip were second cousins, both descending from John II, King of France ("John the Good"). Michelle and Philip had a daughter, Agnes, who died in infancy.

=== Death ===
The remaining part of Michelle's tomb

In 1422, while her husband was away preparing for the battle of Cone, Michelle fell ill and died on 8 July in Ghent. All of the inhabitants grieved, as she had been much loved by the people. She was buried in Saint Bavo's Abbey near the city. In 1540, the abbey was destroyed on the orders of Charles V, Holy Roman Emperor, causing only a fragment of her tomb to remain to this day. After her death, rumors circulated that she had been poisoned by a former attendant, known as Dame de Viesville, a close confidante dismissed shortly before Michelle's death. However, no charges were ever brought up against her.

== Sources ==
- Sumption, Jonathan (2015). The Hundred Years War. Vol. IV: Cursed Kings. Faber and Faber Ltd. ISBN 978-0-571-27456-7.
- Vaughan, Richard (2002). Philip the Good. The Boydell Press. ISBN 978-0-85115-917-1.

Michelle of Valois House of Valois Cadet branch of the Capetian dynasty Born: 11 January 1395 Died: 8 July 1422
Royal titles
Preceded by Margaret of Bavaria	Duchess consort of Burgundy; 10 September 1419 – 8 July 1422	Succeeded by Bonne of Artois
Preceded by Margaret of Bavaria	Countess consort of Artois and Flanders; Countess Palatine of Burgundy; 10 September 1419 – 8 July 1422	Succeeded by Bonne of Artois
Preceded by Margaret of Bavaria	Countess consort of Charolais; June 1409 – 8 July 1422	Succeeded by Bonne of Artois
