= Stephen III of Bavaria =

Duke of Bavaria-Ingolstadt from 1375 (1337–1413)

Stephen III, Duke of Bavaria
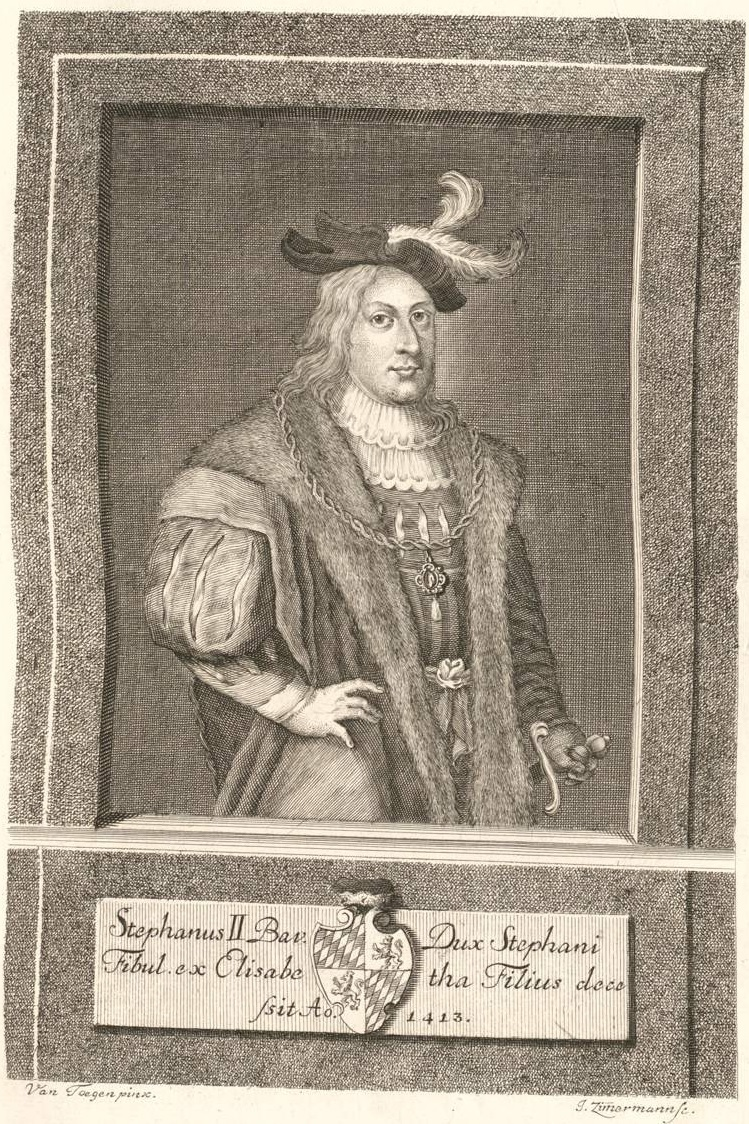
- Born: c. 1337
- Died: 26 September 1413; Niederschönenfeld
- Noble family: House of Wittelsbach
- Spouses: Taddea Visconti; Elisabeth of Cleves
- Issue: Louis VII, Duke of Bavaria; Isabeau, Queen of France
- Father: Stephen II, Duke of Bavaria
- Mother: Elisabeth of Sicily

Stephen III (1337 – 26 September 1413), called the Magnificent or the Fop (Stephan der Kneißl), was the Duke of Bavaria-Ingolstadt from 1375. He was the eldest son of Stephen II and Elizabeth of Sicily.

== Reign ==
From 1375 to 1392, Stephen ruled Bavaria with his brothers Frederick and John II. However, in 1392, Bavaria was split into three separate Duchies, now consisting of Bavaria-Landshut, Bavaria-Ingolstadt and Bavaria-Munich. John II partitioned Bavaria as the result of his refusal to finance his brothers' expensive ambitions in the Italian court. After the division of Bavaria, Stephen retained Bavaria-Ingolstadt, although he soon came to regard his share to be inferior to the other two Duchies. From 1395 to 1397, he also jointly held Bavaria-Munich with John II, after an armed conflict between the brothers.

After the deaths of both of his brothers, Stephen attempted to extend his Duchy, this time causing conflict with his nephews. In opposition to them, Stephen also supported King Rupert against the Luxemburg. In 1402 Stephen was forced by his nephew Ernest to confine his reign to Bavaria-Ingolstadt. In 1403, he supported the citizens' uprising in Munich, although that failed. His final attempt in 1410 to reconquer Tyrol, which his father had ceded to the Grand Duchy of Habsburg was likewise unsuccessful.

He died at Niederschönenfeld.

== Family and children ==
He was married twice. First, he was married on 13 October 1364 to Taddea Visconti, daughter of Bernabò Visconti and Beatrice della Scala. He had, from his first marriage:

- Louis VII the Bearded, who succeeded him in Bavaria-Ingolstadt,
- Isabeau of Bavaria, married Charles VI, king of France

Second, he was married in Cologne on 16 January 1401 to Elisabeth of Cleves, daughter of Count Adolf III of Cleves.

== Sources ==
- Adams, Tracy (2010). The Life and Afterlife of Isabeau of Bavaria. The Johns Hopkins University Press.
- Pitti, Bonaccorso (2015). "Memoirs". In Branca, Vittore (ed.). Merchant Writers: Florentine Memoirs from the Middle Ages and Renaissance. University of Toronto Press. pp. 254–343.

Stephen III of Bavaria House of Wittelsbach Born: 1337 Died: 26 September 1413[aged 76]
Regnal titles
Preceded by Stephen II	Duke of Bavaria-Ingolstadt; 1375–1413	Succeeded by Louis VII the Bearded
