= Niederschönenfeld =

- Municipality
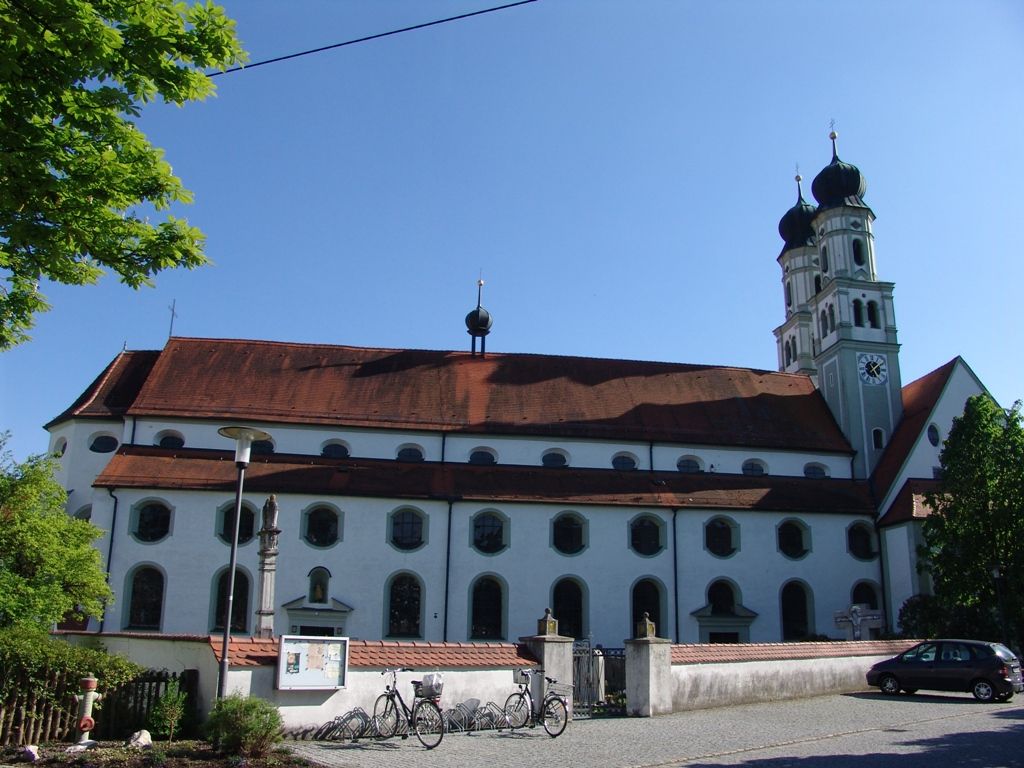
- Church of the Assumption of the Virgin Mary

- Coat of arms

- Location of Niederschönenfeld within Donau-Ries district
- Interactive map of Niederschönenfeld
- Location within Germany Location within Bavaria
- Coordinates: 48°43′N 10°55′E
- Country: Germany
- State: Bavaria
- Admin. region: Schwaben
- District: Donau-Ries
- Municipal assoc.: Rain

Government
  - Mayor (2020–26): Stefan Roßkopf (FW)

Area
  - Total: 14.39 km^{2} (5.56 sq mi)
- Elevation: 397 m (1,302 ft)

Population (2025-12-31)
  - Total: 1,433
  - Density: 99.58/km^{2} (257.9/sq mi)
- Time zone: UTC+01:00 (CET)
  - Summer (DST): UTC+02:00 (CEST)
- Postal codes: 86694
- Dialling codes: 09090
- Vehicle registration: DON
- Website: www.niederschoenenfeld.de

Niederschönenfeld (Swabian: Schänefeld) is a municipality in the district of Donau-Ries in Bavaria in Germany. It lies on the river Danube.

== Mayors ==
- 1978–1996: Johann Höringer
- 1996–2002: Manfred Rümmer
- 2002–2020: Peter Mahl
- since 2020: Stefan Roßkopf

== Penal institution Niederschönfeld ==
The prison exists since 1862. It is the biggest employer in Niederschönenfeld. There is room for 261 prisoners.

Famous prisoners:

- Hans Beimler (1921–1923)
- Erich Mühsam (1920–1924)
- Ernst Toller (1920–1924)
