= House of Wittelsbach =

German royal family of Bavaria

- Parent house: Luitpoldings (?)
- Country: Bavaria, Cologne, Germany, Greece, Hungary, Kalmar Union, Sweden, Palatinate, Lusatia
- Founded: 11th century
- Founder: Otto I
- Current head: Franz, Duke of Bavaria
- Final ruler: Ludwig III
- Titles: Holy Roman Emperor; King of the Romans; King of Hungary; King of Denmark; King of Sweden; King of Norway; King of Greece; King of Bavaria; Grand Duke of Lithuania (Note: by Casimir the IV's mariage to Elizabeth of Austria (1436–1505) (therefore by female line); Charles X Gustav of Sweden, disputed); Duke of Bavaria; Elector of Bavaria; Elector of the Palatinate; Elector of Cologne; Count of Holland; Duke of Cumberland
- Deposition: 13 November 1918
- Cadet branches: See list: Bavaria branch: (extinct) Bavaria-Landshut Bavaria-Straubing Bavaria-Ingolstadt Bavaria-Munich Palatinate branch: (extant) Palatinate-Simmern Palatinate-Sulzbach Palatinate-Neumarkt Palatinate-Zweibrücken Palatinate-Birkenfeld Counts of Dachau and Dukes of Merania (extinct) Counts Palatine of Bavaria and Counts of Wittelsbach (extinct) Löwenstein: (morganatic, extant) Löwenstein-Scharffeneck Löwenstein-Wertheim-Rosenberg Löwenstein-Wertheim-Freudenberg

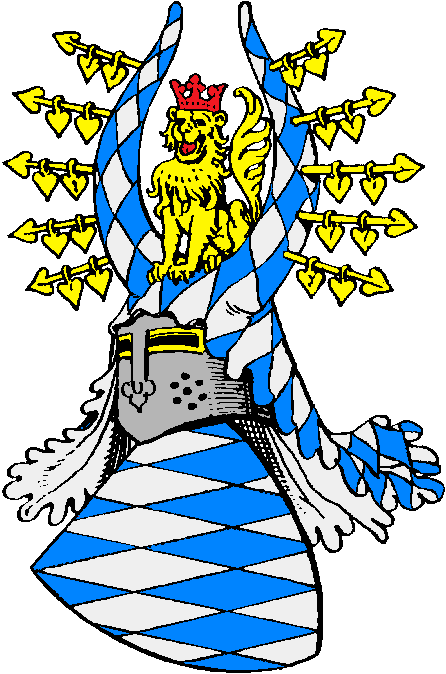
Coat of arms (13th to 14th century). The white-and-blue lozenges came to the family when Otto II Wittelsbach, Duke of Bavaria acquired the county of Bogen in 1240.

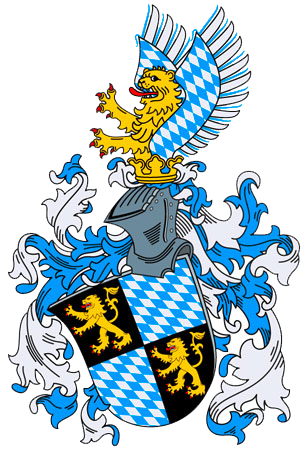
Coat of arms (15th century), the Wittelsbach (Bogen) lozenges quartered with the lion of the Palatinate

The House of Wittelsbach (German: Haus Wittelsbach) is a former Bavarian dynasty, with branches that have ruled over territories including the Electorate of Bavaria, the Electoral Palatinate, the Electorate of Cologne, Holland, Zeeland, Sweden (with Swedish-ruled Finland), Denmark, Norway, Hungary, Bohemia, and Greece. Their ancestral lands of Bavaria and the Palatinate were prince-electorates, and the family had three of its members elected emperors and kings of the Holy Roman Empire. They ruled over the Kingdom of Bavaria which was created in 1805 and continued to exist until 1918.

The House of Windsor, the reigning royal house of the British monarchy, are descendants of Sophia of Hanover (1630–1714), a Wittelsbach Princess of the Palatinate by birth and Electress of Hanover by marriage, who had inherited the succession rights of the House of Stuart and passed them on to the House of Hanover.

== History ==
When Otto I, Count of Scheyern (himself of uncertain origins) died in 1072, his third son Otto II, Count of Scheyern acquired Wittelsbach Castle (near Aichach). The Counts of Scheyern left Scheyern Castle (constructed around 940) in 1119 for Wittelsbach Castle and the former was given to monks to establish Scheyern Abbey. The origins of the Counts of Scheyern are unclear. Some speculative theories link them to Margrave Henry of Schweinfurt and his father Berthold, whose background is also disputed. Some speculate that the Schweinfurters may be descendants of the Luitpolding dynasty, the Bavarian dukes of the 10th century.

The Wittelsbach Conrad of Scheyern-Dachau, a great-grandson of Otto I, Count of Scheyern, became Duke of Merania in 1153 and was succeeded by his son Conrad II. It was the first duchy held by the Wittelsbach family (until 1180/82).

Otto I's eldest son Eckhard I, Count of Scheyern was father of the count palatine of Bavaria, Otto IV (died 1156), who was the first Count of Wittelsbach and whose son Otto was invested with the Duchy of Bavaria in 1180 after the fall of Henry the Lion and hence the first Bavarian ruler from the House of Wittelsbach. Duke Otto's son Louis I, Duke of Bavaria acquired the Electorate of the Palatinate in 1214.

Throughout history, members of the royal house have reigned as Dukes of Merania (1153–1180/82); Dukes, Electors, and Kings of Bavaria (1180–1918); Counts Palatine of the Rhine (1214–1803 and 1816–1918); Margraves of Brandenburg (1323–1373); Counts of Holland, Hainaut, and Zeeland (1345–1433); Elector-Archbishops of Cologne (1583–1761); Dukes of Jülich and Berg (1614–1794/1806); Kings of Sweden (1441–1448 and 1654–1720); and Dukes of Bremen-Verden (1654–1719).

The family also provided two Holy Roman Emperors (1328–1347/1742–1745), one King of the Romans (1400–1410), two Anti-Kings of Bohemia (1619–20/1742–43), one King of Hungary (1305–1308), one King of Denmark and Norway (1440–1448), and one King of Greece (1832–1862).

== Bavaria and Palatinate within the Holy Roman Empire ==
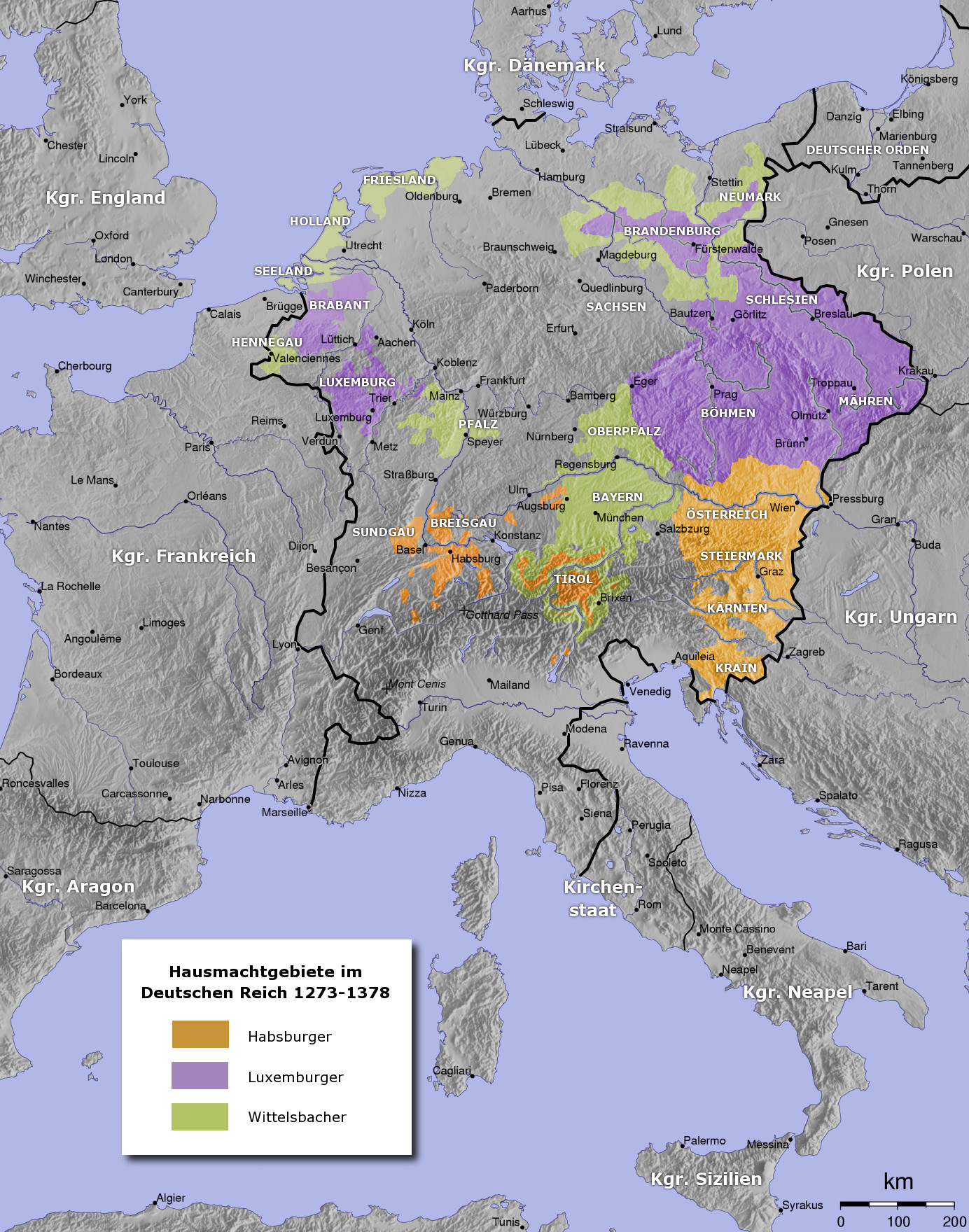
The Wittelsbach dominions within the Holy Roman Empire (Bavaria, the Netherlands and Palatinate) 1373 are shown as Wittelsbach, among the houses of Luxembourg which acquired Brandenburg that year and Habsburg which had acquired Tyrol in 1369

The Wittelsbach dynasty ruled the German territories of Bavaria from 1180 to 1918 and the Electorate of the Palatinate from 1214 until 1805. In both countries they had succeeded rulers from the House of Welf. The Duchy of Bavaria was elevated to the Electorate of Bavaria in 1623, and in 1806, Napoleon elevated it to the Kingdom of Bavaria. In 1815, the majority of the Palatinate was annexed by the Grand Duchy of Baden, with the remainder becoming the Circle of the Rhine.

On Duke Otto II's death in 1253, his sons divided the Wittelsbach possessions between them: Henry became Duke of Lower Bavaria, and Louis II Duke of Upper Bavaria and Count Palatine of the Rhine. When Henry's branch died out in 1340 the Emperor Louis IV, a son of Duke Louis II, reunited the duchy.

The family provided two Holy Roman Emperors: Louis IV (1314–1347) and Charles VII (1742–1745), both members of the Bavarian branch of the family, and one German King with Rupert of Germany (1400–1410), a member of the Palatinate branch.

The House of Wittelsbach split into these two branches in 1329: Under the Treaty of Pavia, Emperor Louis IV granted the Palatinate including the Bavarian Upper Palatinate to his brother Duke Rudolf's descendants, Rudolf II, Rupert I and Rupert II. Rudolf I in this way became the ancestor of the older (Palatinate) line of the Wittelsbach dynasty, which returned to power also in Bavaria in 1777 after the extinction of the younger (Bavarian) line, the descendants of Louis IV.

Through the efforts of Louis IV, the Wittelsbachs controlled the Duchy of Bavaria, the Electorate of the Palatine, the County of Tyrol, the Margraviate of Brandenburg, the County of Holland, County of Zeeland and the County of Hainault. This gave them a chance to dominate the Empire as the previous imperial houses of Hohenstaufen, Salians, Ottonians and Carolingians had. However, in the next generation they were outmaneuvered in Imperial politics by the Habsburgs and the most importantly by the Luxemburgs who both held compact and large possessions in the Duchy of Austria for the former and the Kingdom of Bohemia for the latter that allowed them to expand eastward.

=== Bavarian branch ===
The Bavarian branch kept the Duchy of Bavaria until its extinction in 1777.

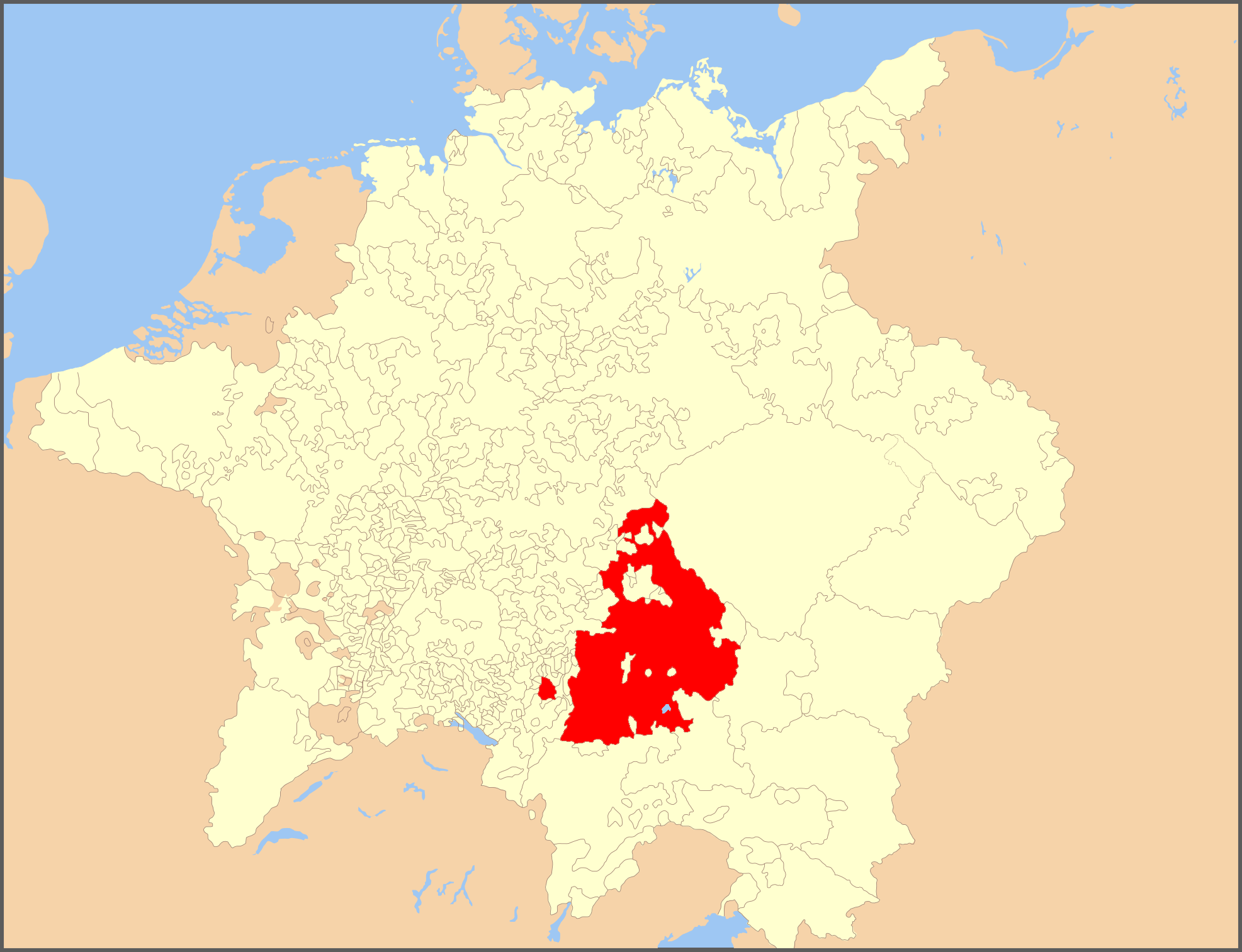
The Electorate of Bavaria highlighted on a map of the Holy Roman Empire in 1648

The Wittelsbach Emperor Louis IV acquired Brandenburg (1323), Tyrol (1342), Holland, Zeeland and Hainaut (1345) for his House but he had also released the Upper Palatinate for the Palatinate branch of the Wittelsbach in 1329. His six sons succeeded him as Duke of Bavaria and Count of Holland and Hainaut in 1347. The Wittelsbachs lost the Tyrol with the death of Duke Meinhard and the following Peace of Schärding – the Tyrol was finally renounced to the Habsburgs in 1369. In 1373 Otto, the last Wittelsbach regent of Brandenburg, released the country to the House of Luxembourg. On Duke Albert's death in 1404, he was succeeded in the Netherlands by his eldest son, William. A younger son, John III, became Prince-Bishop of Liège. However, on William's death in 1417, a war of succession broke out between John and William's daughter Jacqueline of Hainaut. This last episode of the Hook and Cod wars finally left the counties in Burgundian hands in 1433. Emperor Louis IV had reunited Bavaria in 1340 but from 1349 onwards Bavaria was split among the descendants of Louis IV, who created the branches Bavaria-Landshut, Bavaria-Straubing, Bavaria-Ingolstadt and Bavaria-Munich. With the Landshut War of Succession Bavaria was reunited in 1505 against the claim of the Palatinate branch under the Bavarian branch Bavaria-Munich.

From 1549 to 1567 the Wittelsbach owned the County of Kladsko in Bohemia.

Strictly Catholic by upbringing, the Bavarian dukes became leaders of the German Counter-Reformation. From 1583 to 1761, the Bavarian branch of the dynasty provided the Prince-electors and Archbishops of Cologne and many other bishops of the Holy Roman Empire, namely Liège (1581–1763). Wittelsbach princes served at times as Bishops of Regensburg, Freising, Münster, Hildesheim, Paderborn and Osnabrück, and as Grand Master of the Teutonic Order.

In 1623 under Maximilian I the Bavarian dukes were invested with the electoral dignity and the duchy became the Electorate of Bavaria. His grandson Maximilian II Emanuel, Elector of Bavaria served also as Governor of the Habsburg Netherlands (1692–1706) and as Duke of Luxembourg (1712–1714). His son Emperor Charles VII also claimed the throne of Bohemia (1741–1743). With the death of Charles' son Maximilian III Joseph, Elector of Bavaria the Bavarian branch died out in 1777.

=== Palatinate branch ===
The Electorate of the Palatinate (red) which lost the yellow territories in 1505, after the War of the Succession of Landshut

The Palatinate branch kept the Palatinate until 1918, having succeeded also to Bavaria in 1777. With the Golden Bull of 1356 the Counts Palatine were invested with the electoral dignity, and their county became the Electorate of the Palatinate. Princes of the Palatinate branch served as bishops of the Empire and also as Archbishop-Electors of Mainz and Archbishop-Electors of Trier.

After the death of the Wittelsbach king Rupert of Germany in 1410 the Palatinate lands began to split under numerous branches of the family such as Neumarkt, Simmern, Zweibrücken, Birkenfeld, Neuburg, and Sulzbach. When the senior branch of the Palatinate branch died out in 1559, the electorate passed to Frederick III of Simmern, a staunch Calvinist, and the Palatinate became one of the major centers of Calvinism in Europe, supporting Calvinist rebellions in both the Netherlands and France.

The Neuburg cadet branch of the Palatinate branch also held the Duchy of Jülich and Berg from 1614 onwards: when the last duke of Jülich-Cleves-Berg died without direct heirs in 1609, the War of the Jülich succession broke out, ended by the 1614 Treaty of Xanten, which divided the separate duchies between Palatinate-Neuburg and the Margraviate of Brandenburg. Jülich and Berg fell to the Wittelsbach Count Palatine Wolfgang William of Neuburg.

In 1619, the Protestant Frederick V, Elector Palatine became King of Bohemia but was defeated by the Catholic Maximilian I, Elector of Bavaria, a member of the Bavarian branch. As a result, the Upper Palatinate had to be ceded to the Bavarian branch in 1623, along with the Imperial office of Arch-Steward. When the Thirty Years' War concluded with the Treaty of Münster (also called the Peace of Westphalia) in 1648, a new additional electorate was created for the Count Palatine of the Rhine, along with the new office of Imperial Arch-Treasurer. During their exile Frederick's sons, especially Prince Rupert of the Rhine, gained fame in England.

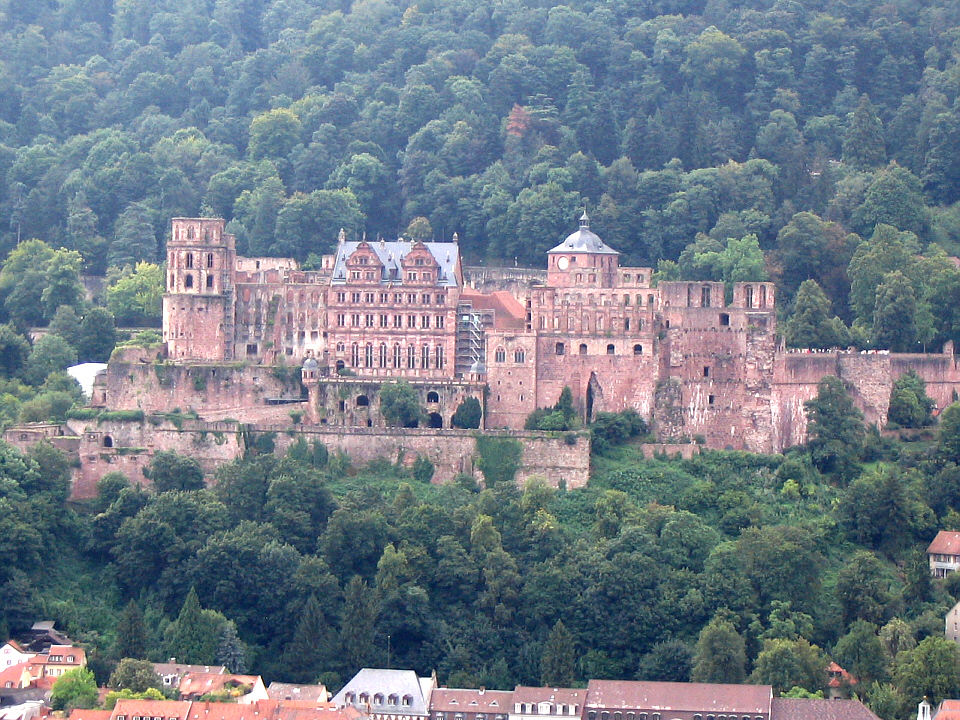
Heidelberg Castle, the seat of the Electors of Palatinate until destroyed by the French in March 1689

The house of Palatinate of Zweibrücken-Kleeburg as heir to the Swedish throne ruled simultaneously the Duchy of Bremen-Verden (1654–1719).

In 1685, the Simmern line died out, and the Catholic Philip William, Count Palatine of Neuburg inherited the Palatinate (and also Duke of Jülich and Berg). During the reign of Johann Wilhelm (1690–1716) the electoral residence moved to Düsseldorf in Berg. His brother and successor Charles III Philip moved the Palatinate's capital back to Heidelberg in 1718 and then to Mannheim in 1720. To strengthen the union of all lines of the Wittelsbach dynasty Charles Philip organized a wedding on 17 January 1742 when his granddaughters were married to Charles Theodore of Palatinate-Sulzbach and the Bavarian prince Clement. In the imperial election a few days later Charles III Philip voted for his Bavarian cousin Prince-Elector Charles Albert. After extinction of the Neuburg branch in 1742, the Palatinate was inherited by Duke Charles Theodore of the branch Palatinate-Sulzbach.

After the extinction of the Bavarian branch in 1777, a succession dispute and the brief War of the Bavarian Succession, the Palatinate-Sulzbach branch under Elector Charles Theodore succeeded also in Bavaria.

With the death of Charles Theodore in 1799 all Wittelsbach land in Bavaria and the Palatinate was reunited under Maximilian IV Joseph, a member of the Palatinate-Zweibrücken-Birkenfeld branch. At the time there were two surviving branches of the Wittelsbach family: Palatinate-Zweibrücken-Birkenfeld (headed by Maximilian Joseph) and Palatinate-Birkenfeld-Gelnhausen (headed by Count Palatine William). Maximilian Joseph inherited Charles Thedore's title of Elector of Bavaria, while William was compensated with the title of Duke in Bavaria. The form "Duke in Bavaria" was selected because in 1506 primogeniture had been established in the House of Wittelsbach resulting in there being only one reigning Duke of Bavaria at any given time. Maximillian Joseph assumed the title of king as Maximilian I Joseph on 1 January 1806. The new king still served as a Prince-elector until the Kingdom of Bavaria left the Holy Roman Empire (1 August 1806).

== Kingdom of Bavaria, 1806–1918 ==
The Bavarian Army was involved in the Austrian defeat at Hohenlinden, and General Jean Victor Marie Moreau once more occupied Munich. By the Treaty of Lunéville (9 February 1801), Bavaria lost the Palatinate and the duchies of Zweibrücken and Jülich. In view of the scarcely disguised ambitions and intrigues of the Austrian court, prime minister Montgelas now believed that the interests of Bavaria lay in a frank alliance with the French Republic; he succeeded in overcoming the reluctance of Maximilian Joseph; and, on 24 August, a separate treaty of peace and alliance with France was signed at Paris, which allied Bavaria with France.

The 1805 Peace of Pressburg (now Bratislava) between Emperor Napoleon of France and Francis II, Holy Roman Emperor, as a consequence of the French victory over the Russians and Austrians at the Battle of Austerlitz (2 December), allowed Maximilian to raise Bavaria to the status of a kingdom. Accordingly, Maximilian proclaimed himself king on 1 January 1806. The King still served as an elector until Bavaria seceded from the Holy Roman Empire on 1 August 1806, joining the Confederation of the Rhine. The Duchy of Berg was ceded to Napoleon only in 1806.

Royal Bavarian coat of arms

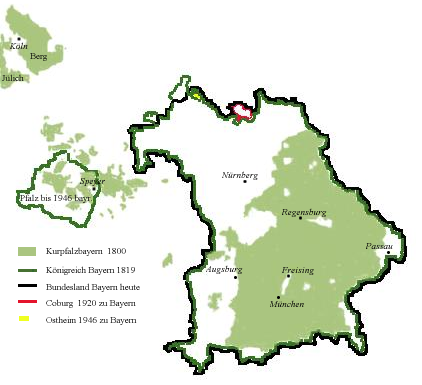
The Electorate of Bavaria including the Electorate of Palatinate (light green, in the old borders around 1800); the new Kingdom of Bavaria (1816, dark green line, with slightly shifted and rounded Palatinate territory and after the loss of the areas of the Duchy of Berg further north on the Rhine, but expanded to include previously ecclesiastical territories, i.e. Franconia and areas of Swabia, as well as small areas on the border with Austria in the south); and today's state of Bavaria (black line border).

The Congress of Vienna 1814−15 led to the establishment of significant territorial gains for the Kingdom of Bavaria. Although the Duchy of Berg remained lost, almost all of Franconia, previously ruled by a number of Prince-bishops, as well as parts of Swabia, which had belonged to various mediatised secular and ecclesiastic princes, came under Bavarian rule. In both areas a number of formerly free imperial cities were also integrated into the kingdom. The previously heavily fragmented Palatinate territory was rounded off and partially moved. Smaller, mostly ecclesiastical territories on the southern border with Austria were also added. In this way, the border of Bavaria, which largely still exists today, was redefined and the state grew by more than a third in size.

Under Maximilian's descendants, Bavaria became the third most powerful German state, behind only Prussia and Austria. When the German Empire was formed in 1871, Bavaria became the new empire's second most powerful state after Prussia. The Wittelsbachs reigned as kings of Bavaria until the German Revolution of 1918–1919. On 12 November 1918 Ludwig III issued the Anif declaration (German: Anifer Erklärung) at Anif Palace in Austria, in which he released his soldiers and officials from their oath of loyalty to him and ended the 738-year rule of the House of Wittelsbach in Bavaria. The republican movement thereupon declared a republic.

== Activities during the Nazi regime, 1933–1945 ==
Before and during the Second World War, the Wittelsbachs were anti-Nazi. Crown Prince Rupert had earned Hitler's eternal enmity by opposing the Beer Hall Putsch in 1923. In 1933, shortly after Hitler's rise to power, he protested against the appointment of governors at the head of the federal states and thus the de facto abolition of German federalism. In 1938, he immigrated to Italy and, after the German Army occupied Italy in September 1943, went into hiding in Florence.

His son, Albrecht, Duke of Bavaria, initially left Germany for Hungary with his family, but was eventually arrested by the Gestapo in October 1944, after Germany had occupied Hungary in March. With his wife, four children and three half-sisters, he was sent to a series of Nazi concentration camps, including Oranienburg, Flossenbürg and Dachau. Badly hit by hunger and disease, the family barely survived. At the end of April 1945, they were liberated by the United States Third Army.

== Current position of the head of the house ==
Albrecht's eldest son, Franz von Bayern (Francis of Bavaria) is the current head of the house.

In the course of the division of state and house assets after the end of the kingdom, the Wittelsbach Compensation Fund (Wittelsbacher Ausgleichsfonds) was established through a compromise in 1923 and the Wittelsbach State Foundation for Art and Science was established by the former Crown Prince Rupprecht of Bavaria. The Wittelsbach State Foundation received the Wittelsbach family's art treasures acquired before 1804 and has since been the owner, although not the manager, of a large part of the holdings of the ancient and classical art museums in Munich, while more recent art collections came into the possession of the compensation fund, into which most of the possessions from the former Wittelsbach House Property Fund were transferred in 1923, including art treasures and collections (in particular the art collection of King Ludwig I, today mostly in the museums Alte Pinakothek and Neue Pinakothek and in the Glyptothek in Munich), the Secret House Archives (today a department of the Bavarian State Archives) and the former royal castles of Berg, Hohenschwangau (including the Museum of the Bavarian Kings), Berchtesgaden and Grünau hunting lodge.

The respective head of the House of Wittelsbach appoints a board of up to 8 directors of the foundation Wittelsbach Compensation Fund. He also appoints one of the 3 board members of the Wittelsbach State Foundation for Art and Science, while the other two are a representative of the Bavarian Ministry of Culture and a museum specialist appointed by the latter. There are around 13,500 cultural items belonging to the Wittelsbach State Foundation while another 43,000 are owned by the Wittelsbach Compensation Fund, mainly shown in museums and collections such as the Pinakotheken.

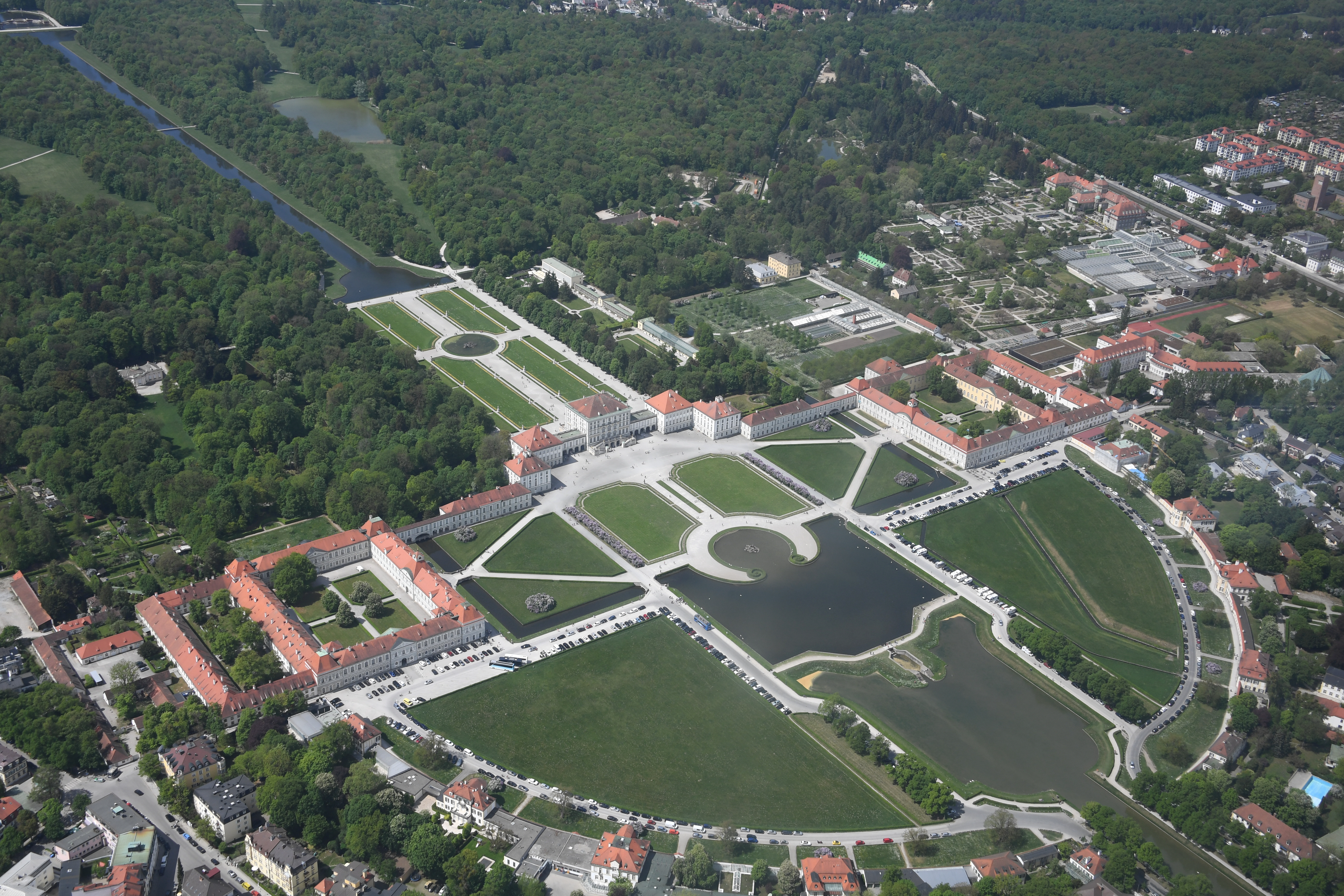
Nymphenburg Palace

The former Bavarian Royal Family receives around 14 million Euros in payments annually from the proceeds of the Wittelsbach Compensation Fund which also owns agricultural and forestry lands, while its main source of income is urban real estate in Munich. The respective head of the family decides on their distribution and use. He has the right to live in the castles mentioned. While Albrecht lived in Berg Palace from 1949 until the end of his life in 1996, his son and successor Franz primarily uses the side wing of the Nymphenburg Palace that is available to him. The administration of the House of Wittelsbach is also based there.

The private assets of the House of Wittelsbach include the castles of Tegernsee Abbey, Wildenwart (near Frasdorf), Leutstetten (near Starnberg) and Kaltenberg as well as agricultural lands and forestry with an area of 12,500 hectares, real estate and industrial shares. These include two breweries that only became significant after the Second World War: the Ducal Bavarian Brewery of Tegernsee and the König Ludwig Schlossbrauerei. Since 2011, the Nymphenburg Porcelain Manufactory is also owned by a member of the family.

The head of the house is also Grand Master of the Wittelsbach House Orders, the Royal Order of Saint George for the Defense of the Immaculate Conception, the Order of Saint Hubert and the Order of Theresa.

Duke Franz maintained the tradition founded by his father of holding a large annual reception with a sit-down dinner at Nymphenburg Palace. Around 1,500 mostly changing guests from state politics, municipalities, churches and sciences, art and medicine as well as friends and relatives are invited. He also invites smaller groups of changing guests to Berchtesgaden Castle to discuss specific topics that are important to him. His 80th birthday party, in 2013, was held at the Schleissheim Palace near Munich. The party was attended by 2,500 guests including the then-incumbent Minister-President of Bavaria, Horst Seehofer.

In addition to numerous honorary positions in Bavaria, including many cultural and scientific institutions, Franz was also a member of the European Foundation for the Imperial Cathedral of Speyer in the State of Rhineland-Palatinate for many years, a position that his younger brother Duke Max Emanuel in Bavaria, has since taken over, through which the House of Wittelsbach still maintains a connection to one of its former main territories, the Electoral Palatinate. Max Emanuel is considered the next in line of succession to the headship of the former ruling dynasty, followed by his and Franz's first cousin Luitpold.

== Reign outside the Holy Roman Empire ==
With Duke Otto III of Lower Bavaria, who was a maternal grandson of Béla IV of Hungary and was elected anti-king of Hungary and Croatia as Bela V (1305–1308) the Wittelsbach dynasty came to power outside the Holy Roman Empire for the first time. Otto had abdicated the Hungarian throne by 1308.

=== Palatinate branch ===
==== United Kingdom ====
The Bill of Rights 1689 and the Act of Settlement 1701 excluded non-Protestants from inheriting the throne of Great Britain, making Sophia of Hanover, a born princess of the House of Palatinate-Simmern, the heir presumptive upon Anne's death. Sophia died two months before Anne, however, and Sophia's eldest son George I of Great Britain succeeded the throne in 1714. In this way, the House of Hanover inherited the British crown. It remained on the throne until the death of Queen Victoria in 1901.

The line of Jacobite succession, which recognises the right for a Catholic monarch from the House of Stuart, acknowledges Franz, Hereditary Prince of Bavaria to be the rightful heir as "Francis II". However, no individual since Henry Benedict Stuart has publicly taken up the claim.

==== Kingdom of Sweden ====
The Swedish Empire following the Treaty of Roskilde of 1658

Christopher III of the House of Palatinate-Neumarkt was king of Denmark, Sweden, and Norway in 1440/1442–1448, but left no descendants.

With the House of Palatinate-Zweibrücken, the Wittelsbachs succeeded to the monarchy of Sweden again 1654–1720 when Queen Christina of Sweden abdicated her throne on 5 June 1654 in favour of her first cousin Charles X Gustav. Under him, Charles XI and Charles XII, Sweden reached its greatest power (see Swedish Empire). Charles XII was succeeded by his sister Ulrika Eleonora.

Sweden reached its largest territorial extent under the rule of Charles X Gustav after the Treaty of Roskilde in 1658. Charles Gustav's son Charles XI rebuilt the economy and refitted the army. His legacy to his son Charles XII was one of the finest arsenals in the world, a large standing army, and a large fleet. Charles XII was a skilled military leader and tactician. However, although he was also skilled as a politician, he was reluctant in making peace. While Sweden achieved several large scale military successes early on, and won the most battles, the Great Northern War eventually ended in Sweden's defeat and the end of the Swedish Empire. Charles was succeeded to the Swedish throne by his sister, Ulrika Eleonora. Her abdication in favour of her husband Frederick I in 1720 marked the end of Wittelsbach rule in Sweden.

==== Kingdom of Greece ====
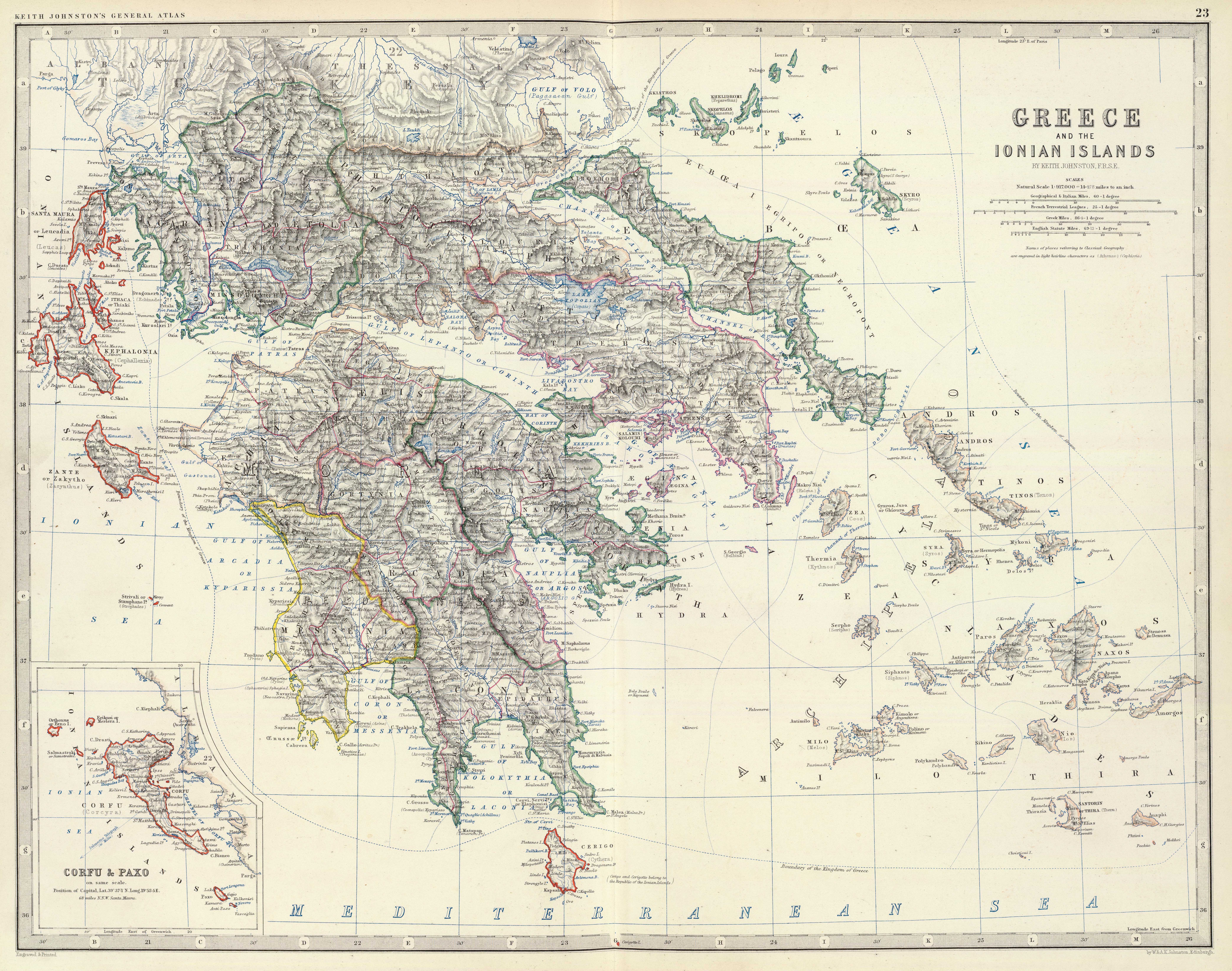
The Kingdom of Greece in 1861

Prince Otto of Bavaria was chosen by the London Conference of 1832 to be king of newly independent Greece. This was confirmed by the Treaty of Constantinople, whereby Greece became a new independent kingdom under the protection of the Great Powers (the United Kingdom, France and the Russian Empire).

Throughout his reign, Otto faced political challenges concerning Greece's financial weakness and the role of the government in the affairs of the Church. The politics of Greece of this era was based on affiliations with the three Great Powers, and Otto's ability to maintain the support of the powers was key to his remaining in power. To remain strong, Otto had to play the interests of each of the Great Powers' Greek adherents against the others, while not aggravating the Great Powers. Otto's standing amongst Greeks suffered when Greece was blockaded by the British Royal Navy in 1850 and 1853 to stop Greece from attacking the Ottoman Empire during the Crimean War. As a result, there was an assassination attempt on his wife Queen Amalia in 1861. In 1862, Otto was deposed while in the countryside, and in 1863, the Greek National Assembly elected George I of the House of Glücksburg, aged only 17, King of the Hellenes, marking the end of Wittelsbach rule in Greece.

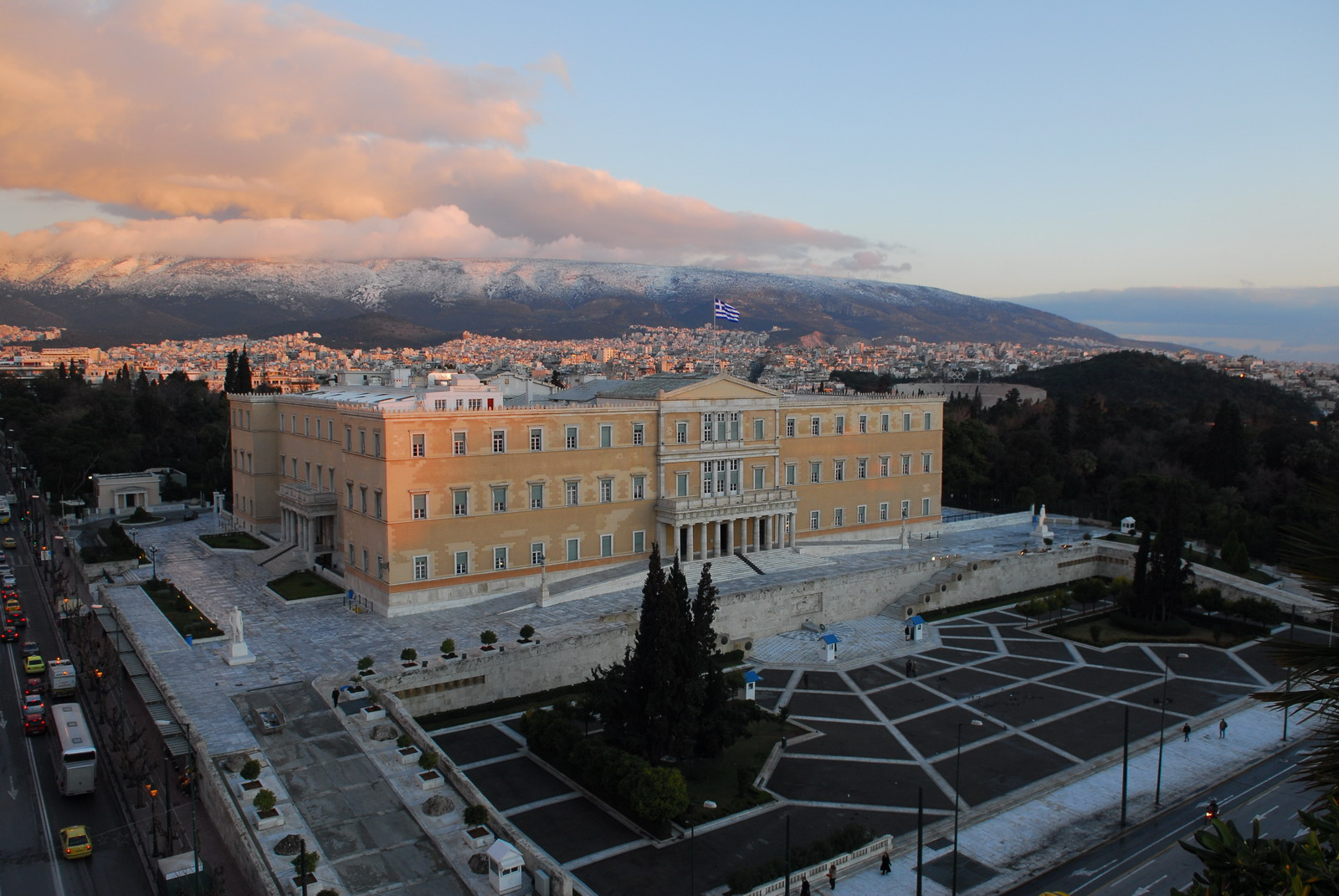
The Old Royal Palace in Athens, built for King Otto I by Friedrich von Gärtner, 1841

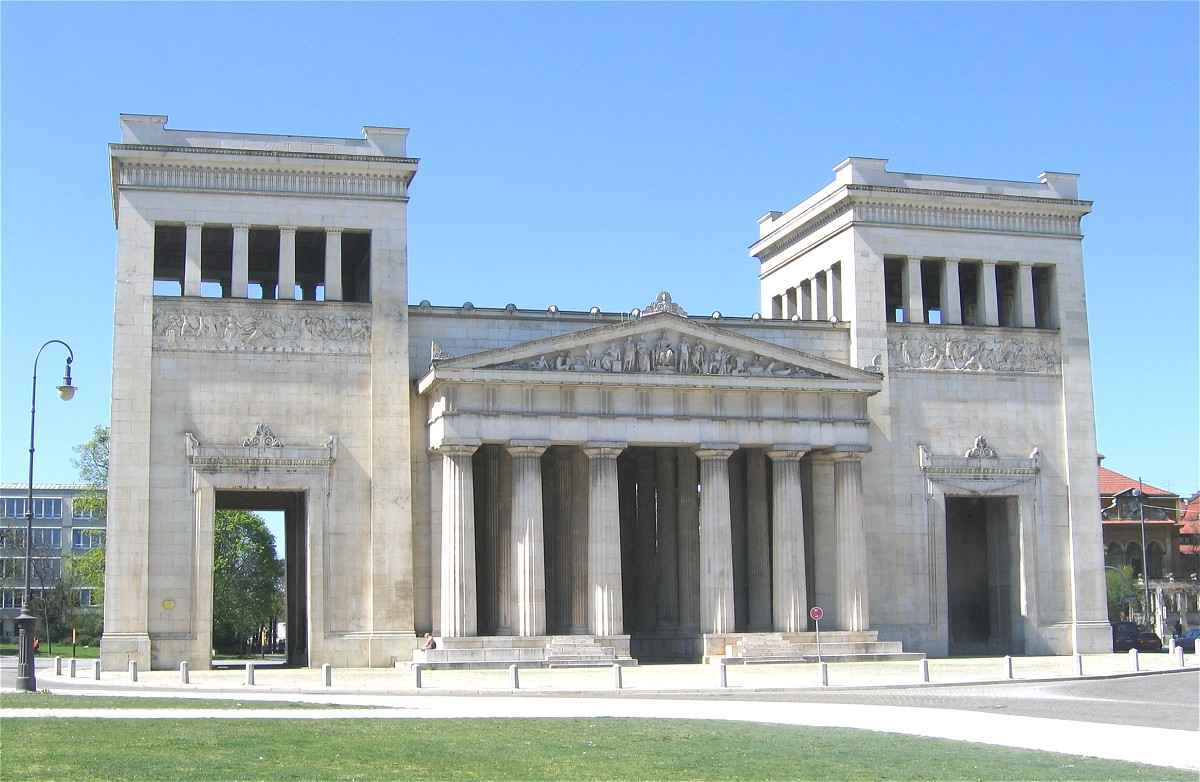
Propylaea in Munich, monument for the secundogeniture of the Wittelsbach in Greece

=== Bavarian branch ===
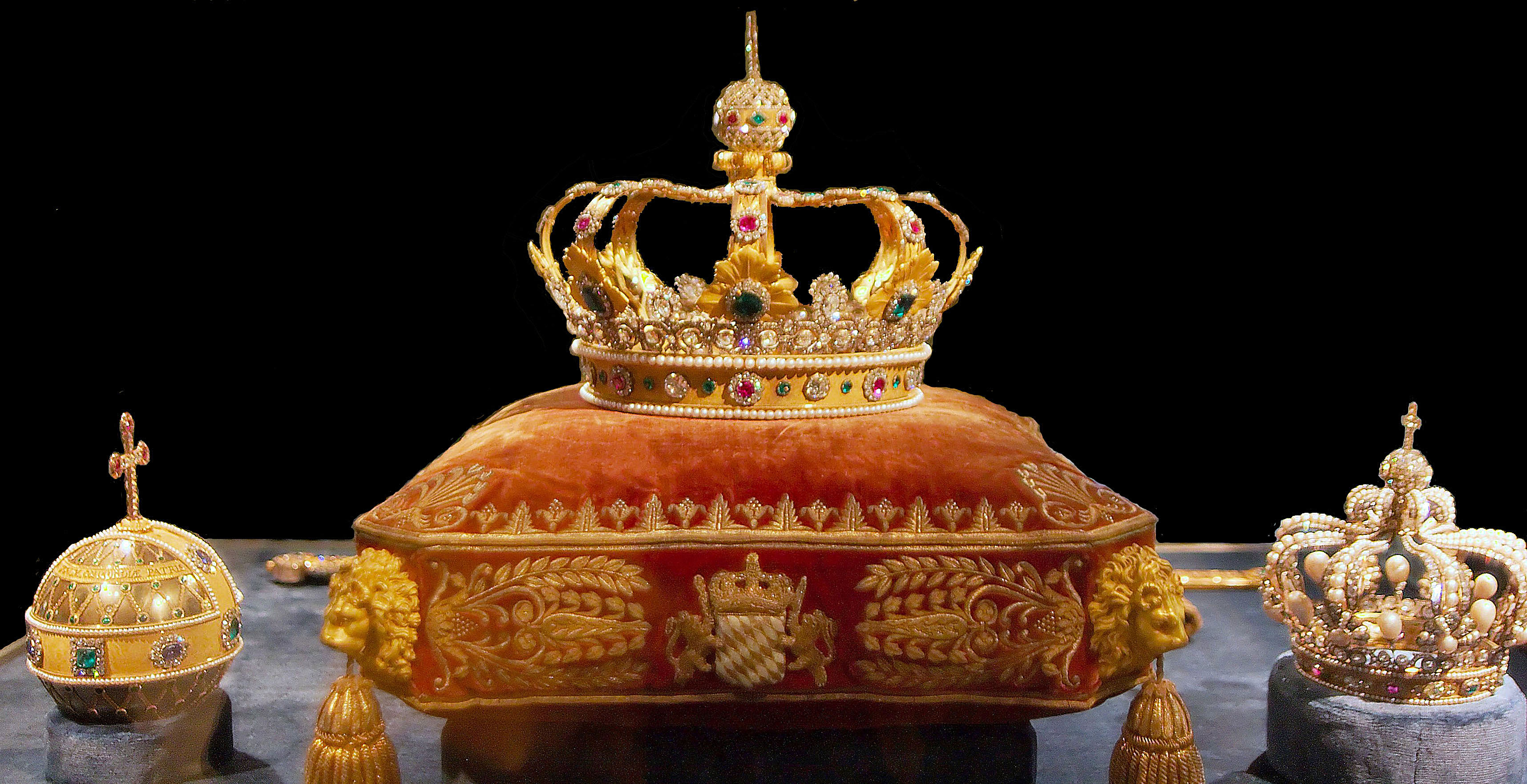
The Bavarian Crown Jewels (at Munich Residenz)

Joseph Ferdinand, a son of Maximilian II Emanuel, was the favored choice of England and the Netherlands to succeed as the ruler of Spain, and Charles II of Spain chose him as his heir. Due to the unexpected death of Joseph Ferdinand in 1699 the Wittelsbachs did not come to power in Spain, leaving the Spanish Succession uncertain again.

== Rulers ==
=== House of Wittelsbach ===
Partitions under Wittelsbach rule

Duchy of Bavaria	County Palatine of the Rhine
County of Scheyern (1050–1209)
County of Valley (1123–1268)	County of Dachau (1072–1182)
Briefly inherited by the Counts of Ortenburg (1209–1248)
Duchy of Bavaria (1180–1349) (Scheyern line; Divided in Upper and Lower Bavaria in 1253–1340)
To Bavaria
County Palatine of the Rhine (1329–1356) Raised to Electorate of the Palatinate (1356–1559)
Duchy of Lower Bavaria (1349–1353)	Duchy of Upper Bavaria (1349–1363)
Duchy of Landshut (1353–1505)	Duchy of Straubing (1353–1425/33)
Shared property between Straubing and Landshut
Duchy of Munich (1392–1503)	Duchy of Ingolstadt (1392–1445)
(Divided between the other duchies)	County of Neumarkt (1410–1448)
Duchy of Landshut (1353–1505)	County of Mosbach (1410–1490)
County of Simmern (1st creation) (1410–1598)	County of Zweibrücken (1459–1677)
Duchy of Bavaria (1503–1623) Raised to Electorate of Bavaria (1623–1806)	County of Neuburg (1505–1559)
County of Veldenz (1543–1694)
Annexed to Zweibrücken (1559–1569)	Electorate of the Palatinate (Simmern line)(1559–1685)
County of Neuburg (Zweibrücken line) (1569–1685)	County of Sulzbach (1569–1604)	County of Birkenfeld (1569–1731)
Annexed to Neuburg (1604–1614)	County of Kleeburg (1604–1718)	County of Zweibrücken (1459–1799)
County of Simmern (2nd creation) (1610–1674)	County of Sulzbach (Neuburg line) (1614–1742)
County of Gelnhausen (1654–1799)
Duchy of Leuchtenberg (1646–1705)
Electorate of the Palatinate (Neuburg line) (1685–1742)
Electorate of Bavaria (1623–1806)
(Kleeburg line 1718–31)
(Birkenfeld line 1731–99)
Electorate of the Palatinate (Sulzbach line) (1742–1799)
Electorate of the Palatinate (Zweibrücken line) (1799–1803)
Electorate of Bavaria (1623–1806)

Table of rulers

Ruler		Born	Reign	Ruling part	Consort	Death	Notes
Otto I		c. 1020 (Possible) son of Heinrich I, Count of Pegnitz	c. 1050 – December 1072	County of Scheyern	? of Reichersbeuern Haziga of Diessen; 1057 (four children in total)	December 1072 aged 51–52	
Eckhard		1044; First son of Otto I	December 1072 – May 1091	County of Scheyern	Richardis of Carniola-Orlamünde three children	May 1091 aged 46–47	Children of Otto I, ruled jointly. Arnold took his own seat at Dachau.
Bernard		c. 1045; Second son of Otto I	December 1072 – 2 March 1104	County of Scheyern	Unmarried	2 March 1104; Scheyern aged	Children of Otto I, ruled jointly. Arnold took his own seat at Dachau.
Otto II		c. 1060; Third son of Otto I	December 1072 – 31 October 1120	County of Scheyern	Richardis of Carniola-Orlamünde four children	31 October 1120 aged 59–60	Children of Otto I, ruled jointly. Arnold took his own seat at Dachau.
Arnold I		c. 1060; Fourth son of Otto I	December 1072 – March 1123	County of Dachau	Beatrix of Reipersberg; 1204 one child	March 1123 aged 62–63	Children of Otto I, ruled jointly. Arnold took his own seat at Dachau.
Otto III		c. 1090? Son of Otto II and Richardis of Carniola-Orlamünde	31 October 1120 – December 1130	County of Scheyern	Unmarried	December 1130 aged 39–40?	Left no children. He was succeeded by his namesakee half-brother/cousin.
Conrad I		c. 1090; First son of Arnold I and Beatrix of Reipersberg	March 1123 – November 1130	County of Dachau	Willibirg of Carniola-Orlamünde two children	November 1130 aged 39–40	Children of Arnold I, ruled jointly. Otto took his own seat at Valley.
Arnold II		c. 1090; Second son of Arnold I and Beatrix of Reipersberg	March 1123 – April 1124	County of Dachau	Unmarried	April 1124; Oberschleißheim aged 33–34	Children of Arnold I, ruled jointly. Otto took his own seat at Valley.
Otto I		c. 1090; Third son of Arnold I and Beatrix of Reipersberg	March 1123 – November 1130	County of Valley	Adelheid of Weilheim five children	November 1130 aged 39–40	Children of Arnold I, ruled jointly. Otto took his own seat at Valley.
Conrad II		c. 1110; First son of Conrad I and Willibirg of Carniola-Orlamünde	November 1130 – 18 February 1159	County of Dachau (with the Duchy of Merania since 1152)	Adelaide of Limburg Udehild of Falkenstein two children in total	18 February 1159 aged 48–49?	Children of Conrad I, ruled jointly. Conrad acquired also the Duchy of Merania, which was directly inherited by his son. Th county of Dachau was only given to Conrad III after Arnold's abdication in 1172.
Arnold III		c. 1110; Second son of Conrad I and Willibirg of Carniola-Orlamünde	November 1130 – 1172	County of Dachau	Unmarried	November 1185 aged 74–75?	Children of Conrad I, ruled jointly. Conrad acquired also the Duchy of Merania, which was directly inherited by his son. Th county of Dachau was only given to Conrad III after Arnold's abdication in 1172.
Conrad I		c. 1110; Son of Otto I and Adelheid of Weilheim	November 1130 – 28 April 1162	County of Valley	Agnes of Greifenstein five children	1175; Valley aged 39–40	
Otto IV		1083; Son of Eckhard and Richardis of Carniola-Orlamünde	December 1130 – 4 August 1156	County of Scheyern	Heilika of Lengenfeld; 13 July 1116 nine children	4 August 1156; Wittelsbach Castle aged 72–73	
Otto V & III the Redhead		1117; Kelheim; First son of Otto IV and Heilika of Lengenfeld	4 August 1156 – 16 September 1180	County of Scheyern	Agnes of Loon; 1169 eleven children	11 July 1183; Pfullendorf aged 65–66	In 1180, received, from Frederick I, Holy Roman Emperor, the Duchy of Bavaria.
Otto V & III the Redhead		1117; Kelheim; First son of Otto IV and Heilika of Lengenfeld	16 September 1180 – 11 July 1183	Duchy of Bavaria	Agnes of Loon; 1169 eleven children	11 July 1183; Pfullendorf aged 65–66	In 1180, received, from Frederick I, Holy Roman Emperor, the Duchy of Bavaria.
Otto II		c. 1140; First son of Conrad I and Agnes of Greifenstein	28 April 1162 – 29 October 1172	County of Valley	Unmarried	November 1130 aged 39–40	Children of Conrad I, ruled jointly.
Conrad II		c. 1140; Second son of Conrad I and Agnes of Greifenstein	28 April 1162 – 1196	County of Valley	Matilda of Ortenburg three children	1196 aged 65–66	Children of Conrad I, ruled jointly.
Conrad III		c. 1130; Son of Conrad II	1172 – 8 October 1182	County of Dachau (with the Duchy of Merania since 1159)	Willibirg of Carniola-Orlamünde two children	8 October 1182 aged 51–52	After his death with no children, Dachau was absorbed by Bavaria.
Dachau annexed to the Duchy of Bavaria
Otto VI the Younger		c. 1120; Second son of Otto IV and Heilika of Lengenfeld	16 September 1180 – 18 August 1189	County of Scheyern	Benedicta of Donauwörth; 1204 one child	18 August 1189 aged 68–69	
Regency of Agnes of Loon, Otto VI, Count of Scheyern and Conrad of Wittelsbach, Archbishop of Mainz (1183–1189)							Obtained (through marriage) the Palatinate of the Rhine in 1214. He was assassinated in 1231.
Louis I the Kelheimer		23 December 1173; Kelheim; Son of Otto V & III and Agnes of Loon	11 July 1183 – 15 September 1231	Duchy of Bavaria	Ludmilla of Bohemia; 1204 one child	15 September 1231; Kelheim aged 57	Obtained (through marriage) the Palatinate of the Rhine in 1214. He was assassinated in 1231.
Otto VII		c. 1160; Son of Otto VI and Benedicta of Donauwörth	18 August 1189 – 7 March 1209	County of Scheyern	Unmarried	7 March 1209; Bad Abbach aged 48–49	Assassinated Philip of Swabia. After his death, Scheyern went briefly to the control of the Ortenburg family, and then joined the Duchy of Bavaria.
Scheyern annexed to the County of Ortenburg, and then joined the Duchy of Bavaria
Otto III		c. 1190; Son of Conrad II and Matilda of Ortenburg	1196 – 1268	County of Valley	Adelheid of Weilheim five children	1268 aged c. 77–78?	After his death with no children, Valley was absorbed by Bavaria.
Valley annexed to the Duchy of Bavaria
Otto IV the Illustrious		7 April 1206; Kelheim; Son of Louis I and Ludmilla of Bohemia	15 September 1231 – 29 November 1253	Duchy of Bavaria	Agnes of the Palatinate; 1222; Worms eleven children	29 November 1253; Landshut aged 47	Through his wife, he and his children inherited the Palatinate. After his death, Bavaria was divided between his children.
Louis II the Strict		13 April 1229; Heidelberg; First son of Otto IV and Agnes of the Palatinate	29 November 1253 – 2 February 1294	Duchy of Upper Bavaria and County Palatine of the Rhine	Maria of Brabant; 2 August 1254 no children Anna of Głogów; 1260 two children Matilda of Austria; 24 October 1273 four children	2 February 1294; Heidelberg aged 64	Children of Otto IV, divided the duchy.
Henry XIII		19 November 1235; Landshut; Second son of Otto IV and Agnes of the Palatinate	29 November 1253 – 3 February 1290	Duchy of Lower Bavaria	Elizabeth of Hungary; 1250 ten children	3 February 1290; Burghausen aged 54	Children of Otto IV, divided the duchy.
Otto V		11 February 1261; Burghausen; First son of Henry XIII and Elizabeth of Hungary	3 February 1290 – 9 November 1312	Duchy of Lower Bavaria	Catharina of Austria; January 1279 two children Agnes of Głogów; 18 May 1309 two children	9 November 1312; Landshut aged 51	Children of Henry XIII, ruled jointly. In 1305 Otto became also King of Hungary and Croatia, as grandson of king Béla IV of Hungary.
Louis III		9 February 1269; Landshut; Second son of Henry XIII and Elizabeth of Hungary	3 February 1290 – 13 May 1296	Duchy of Lower Bavaria	Isabella of Lorraine; 1287 no children	13 May 1296; Landshut aged 27	Children of Henry XIII, ruled jointly. In 1305 Otto became also King of Hungary and Croatia, as grandson of king Béla IV of Hungary.
Stephen I		14 March 1271; Landshut; Third son of Henry XIII and Elizabeth of Hungary	3 February 1290 – 10 December 1310	Duchy of Lower Bavaria	Judith of Świdnica-Jawor; 1299 eight children	10 December 1310; Landshut aged 27	Children of Henry XIII, ruled jointly. In 1305 Otto became also King of Hungary and Croatia, as grandson of king Béla IV of Hungary.
During a later division of territory among Louis II's heirs in 1294, the elder branch of the Wittelsbachs came into possession of both the Rhenish Palatinate and the territories in Bavaria north of the Danube river (the Nordgau) centred around the town of Amberg. As this region was politically connected to the Rhenish Palatinate, the name Upper Palatinate (Oberpfalz) became common from the early 16th century, to contrast with the Lower Palatinate along the Rhine.
Regency of Matilda of Austria (1294–1296)							Sons of Louis II, ruled jointly. In 1317 Rudolph abdicated of his rights to his brother, who in 1328 was elected Holy Roman Emperor. Louis had already been elected King of Germany in 1314. After occupying also the Palatinate, preventing the ascension of Rudolph's son Adolph, he eventually ceded his rights in Palatinate to Adolph's yoounger brothers in the Treaty of Pavia (1329). After John I the Child's death in 1340, Louis IV unified the Bavarian duchy.
Rudolph I the Stammerer		4 October 1274; Basel; First son of Louis II and Matilda of Austria	2 February 1294 – 1317	Duchy of Upper Bavaria (1294–1340) and County Palatine of the Rhine (1294–1329)	Matilda of Nassau; 1 September 1294; Nuremberg six children	12 August 1319; Kingdom of England (?) aged 44	Sons of Louis II, ruled jointly. In 1317 Rudolph abdicated of his rights to his brother, who in 1328 was elected Holy Roman Emperor. Louis had already been elected King of Germany in 1314. After occupying also the Palatinate, preventing the ascension of Rudolph's son Adolph, he eventually ceded his rights in Palatinate to Adolph's yoounger brothers in the Treaty of Pavia (1329). After John I the Child's death in 1340, Louis IV unified the Bavarian duchy.
Louis IV the Bavarian		5 April 1282; Munich; Second son of Louis II and Matilda of Austria	2 February 1294 – 20 December 1340	Duchy of Upper Bavaria (1294–1340) and County Palatine of the Rhine (1294–1329)	Beatrice of Świdnica-Jawor; 14 October 1308 six children Margaret II, Countess of Holland-Hainaut; 26 February 1324; Cologne ten children	11 October 1347; Puch, near Fürstenfeldbruck aged 65	Sons of Louis II, ruled jointly. In 1317 Rudolph abdicated of his rights to his brother, who in 1328 was elected Holy Roman Emperor. Louis had already been elected King of Germany in 1314. After occupying also the Palatinate, preventing the ascension of Rudolph's son Adolph, he eventually ceded his rights in Palatinate to Adolph's yoounger brothers in the Treaty of Pavia (1329). After John I the Child's death in 1340, Louis IV unified the Bavarian duchy.
Louis IV the Bavarian		5 April 1282; Munich; Second son of Louis II and Matilda of Austria	20 December 1340 – 11 October 1347	Duchy of Bavaria	Beatrice of Świdnica-Jawor; 14 October 1308 six children Margaret II, Countess of Holland-Hainaut; 26 February 1324; Cologne ten children	11 October 1347; Puch, near Fürstenfeldbruck aged 65	Sons of Louis II, ruled jointly. In 1317 Rudolph abdicated of his rights to his brother, who in 1328 was elected Holy Roman Emperor. Louis had already been elected King of Germany in 1314. After occupying also the Palatinate, preventing the ascension of Rudolph's son Adolph, he eventually ceded his rights in Palatinate to Adolph's yoounger brothers in the Treaty of Pavia (1329). After John I the Child's death in 1340, Louis IV unified the Bavarian duchy.
Regency of Louis IV, Duke of Upper Bavaria (1312–1319)							Children of Stephen I and Otto V, ruled jointly.
Henry XIV the Elder		29 September 1305; First son of Stephen I and Judith of Świdnica-Jawor	9 November 1312 – 1 September 1339	Duchy of Lower Bavaria	Margaret of Bohemia; 12 August 1328; Straubing two children	1 September 1339; Landshut aged 33	Children of Stephen I and Otto V, ruled jointly.
Otto VI		3 January 1307; Second son of Stephen I and Judith of Świdnica-Jawor	9 November 1312 – 14 December 1334	Duchy of Lower Bavaria	Richardis of Jülich; 1330 one child	14 December 1334; Munich aged 27	Children of Stephen I and Otto V, ruled jointly.
Henry XV of Natternberg		28 August 1312; First son of Otto V and Agnes of Głogów	9 November 1312 – 18 June 1333	Duchy of Lower Bavaria	Anna of Austria between 1326 and 1328 no children	18 June 1333; Natternberg (Deggendorf) aged 20	Children of Stephen I and Otto V, ruled jointly.
Regency of Louis IV, Duke of Bavaria (1339–1340)							Left no male heirs, which allowed his cousin (and brother-in-law) Louis to reunite the Bavarian lands.
John I the Child		29 November 1329; Son of Henry XIV and Margaret of Bohemia	1 September 1339 – 20 December 1340	Duchy of Lower Bavaria	Anna of Upper Bavaria; 18 April 1339; Munich no children	20 December 1340; Landshut aged 11	Left no male heirs, which allowed his cousin (and brother-in-law) Louis to reunite the Bavarian lands.
In 1327, Louis IV, Duke of Bavaria occupied Palatinate, but was not recognized as Count Palatine, as he was defending the position of his younger nephews against the claimancy of his older nephew, Adolf, Count Palatine of the Rhine. Ten years later gave it to his nephews, sons of Rudolph. With the Treaty of Pavia in 1329, as Emperor, Louis made formal his donation, pushing back the claimant Count Adolf.
Rudolph II the Blind		8 August 1306; Wolfratshausen; Second son of Rudolph I and Matilda of Nassau	1329 – 4 October 1353	County Palatine of the Rhine	Anna of Carinthia-Tyrol; 1328 one child Margaret of Sicily; 1348 no children	4 October 1353; Neustadt an der Weinstraße aged 47	Following the early death of his elder brother Adolph, it was him who took over the county after the withdraw of their uncle Louis IV. Left no descendants. He was succeeded by his brother Robert.
Louis V the Brandenburger		May 1315; First son of Louis IV and Beatrice of Świdnica-Jawor	11 October 1347 – 18 September 1361	Duchy of Upper Bavaria (in all Bavaria until 1349; with the Margraviate of Brandenburg since 1323 and until 1351)	Margaret of Denmark; 1324 no children Margaret, Countess of Tyrol; 10 February 1342; Meran four children	18 September 1361; Zorneding aged 46	Children of Louis IV, ruled jointly until 1349, when they divided their inheritance: Louis V, Louis VI and Otto VII kept Upper Bavaria; William, Albert and Stephen Lower Bavaria. In 1351 Louis VI and Otto gave up their inheritance in Bavaria, in exchange of the Electoral dignity in Brandenburg. Having lost the Electorate of Brandenburg in 1373, Otto returned to Bavaria to claim new inheritance, and shared the part of Stephen II's sons (his nephews) in Landshut (Lower Bavaria) In Lower Bavaria, the three brothers divided the duchy again in 1353: Stephen kept Landshut, William and Albert shared Straubing, and from 1389 the two shared Straubing also with Albert I's son, Albert II.
Louis VI the Roman		7 May 1328; Rome; First son of Louis IV and Margaret II, Countess of Holland-Hainaut	11 October 1347 – December 1351	Duchy of Upper Bavaria (in all Bavaria until 1349)	Cunigunde of Poland before 1349 no children Ingeborg of Mecklenburg-Schwerin; 1360 no children	17 May 1365; Berlin aged 37	
Louis VI the Roman		7 May 1328; Rome; First son of Louis IV and Margaret II, Countess of Holland-Hainaut	December 1351 – 17 May 1365	Margraviate of Brandenburg (until 1356) Electorate of Brandenburg (from 1356)	Cunigunde of Poland before 1349 no children Ingeborg of Mecklenburg-Schwerin; 1360 no children	17 May 1365; Berlin aged 37	
Otto VII the Lazy		1346; Fourth son of Louis IV and Margaret II, Countess of Holland-Hainaut	11 October 1347 – December 1351	Duchy of Upper Bavaria (in all Bavaria until 1349)	Catherine of Bohemia; 19 March 1366 no children	15 November 1379; Wolfstein Castle aged 32–33	
Otto VII the Lazy		1346; Fourth son of Louis IV and Margaret II, Countess of Holland-Hainaut	December 1351 – 18 August 1373	Margraviate of Brandenburg (until 1356) Electorate of Brandenburg (from 1356)	Catherine of Bohemia; 19 March 1366 no children	15 November 1379; Wolfstein Castle aged 32–33	
Otto VII the Lazy		1346; Fourth son of Louis IV and Margaret II, Countess of Holland-Hainaut	18 August 1373 – 15 November 1379	Duchy of Landshut (in co-rulership with his brother 1373–75, with his nephews 1375–79)	Catherine of Bohemia; 19 March 1366 no children	15 November 1379; Wolfstein Castle aged 32–33	
Stephen II the Representative		1319; Second son of Louis IV and Beatrice of Świdnica-Jawor	11 October 1347 – 13 May 1375	Duchy of Landshut (in all Bavaria until 1349; in Lower Bavaria until 1353)	Elisabeth of Sicily; 27 June 1328 four children Margaret of Nuremberg; 14 February 1359 three children	13 May 1375; Landshut or Munich aged 55–56	
William I the Mad		12 May 1330; Frankfurt am Main; Second son of Louis IV and Margaret II, Countess of Holland-Hainaut	11 October 1347 – 15 April 1389	Duchy of Straubing (in all Bavaria until 1349; in Lower Bavaria until 1353; with the maternal Counties of Holland, Zeeland and Hainaut since 1356)	Matilda of England; 1352; London no children	15 April 1389; Le Quesnoy aged 58	
Albert I		25 July 1336; Munich; Third son of Louis IV and Margaret II, Countess of Holland-Hainaut	11 October 1347 – 13 December 1404	Duchy of Straubing (in all Bavaria until 1349; in Lower Bavaria until 1353; with the maternal Counties of Holland, Zeeland and Hainaut since 1356)	Margaret of Brzeg after 19 July 1353; Passau seven children Margaret of Clèves; 1394; Heusden no children	13 December 1404; The Hague aged 68	
Albert II		1368; Second son of Albert I and Margaret of Brzeg	15 April 1389 – 21 January 1397	Duchy of Straubing (in all Bavaria until 1349; in Lower Bavaria until 1353; with the maternal Counties of Holland, Zeeland and Hainaut since 1356)	Unmarried	21 January 1397; Kelheim aged 28–29	
Electorate of Brandenburg lost to the House of Hohenzollern
The Golden Bull of 1356 confirmed the right to participate in the election of a Holy Roman Emperor to the Count Palatine, title that evolved to Elector Palatine.
Robert I the Red		9 June 1309; Wolfratshausen; Third son of Rudolph I and Matilda of Nassau	4 October 1353 – 16 February 1390	County Palatine of the Rhine (until 1356) Electorate of the Palatinate (from 1356)	Elisabeth of Namur; 1350 or 1358 no children Beatrix of Berg; 1385 no children	16 Febrruarry 1390; Neustadt an der Weinstraße aged 47	On 10 January 1356 was recognized as the First Elector Palatine. Left no descendants. He was succeeded by his cousin Robert, son of the titular count Adolf.
Meinhard		9 February 1344; Landshut; Son of Louis V and Margaret, Countess of Tyrol	18 September 1361 – 13 January 1363	Duchy of Upper Bavaria	Margaret of Austria; 4 September 1359; Passau no children	13 January 1363; Tirol Castle aged 18	Left no male descendants. After his death Upper Bavaria was divided between Bavaria-Landshut and Bavaria-Straubing.
Divided between Bavaria-Landshut and Bavaria-Straubing
Stephen III the Magnificent		1337; First son of Stephen II and Elisabeth of Sicily	13 May 1375 – 26 September 1413	Duchy of Ingolstadt (in Landshut until 1392)	Taddea Visconti; 13 October 1364 two children Myntha Elisabeth of Cleves; 16 January 1401; Cologne no children	26 September 1413; Niederschönenfeld aged 75–76	Children of Stephen II, shared rule, until 1379, with their uncle Otto VII. In 1392 the brothers divided the land once more. Frederick retained Landshut, Stephen kept Ingolstadt and John received Munich.
Frederick the Wise		1339; Second son of Stephen II and Elisabeth of Sicily	13 May 1375 – 4 December 1393	Duchy of Landshut	Anna of Neuffen-Hettingen; 1360 one child Maddalena Visconti; 2 September 1381 five children	4 December 1393; České Budějovice aged 53–54	Children of Stephen II, shared rule, until 1379, with their uncle Otto VII. In 1392 the brothers divided the land once more. Frederick retained Landshut, Stephen kept Ingolstadt and John received Munich.
John II		1341; Third son of Stephen II and Elisabeth of Sicily	13 May 1375 – 1 July 1397	Duchy of Munich (in Landshut until 1392)	Catherine of Gorizia; 1372 three children	1 July 1397 aged 55–56	Children of Stephen II, shared rule, until 1379, with their uncle Otto VII. In 1392 the brothers divided the land once more. Frederick retained Landshut, Stephen kept Ingolstadt and John received Munich.
Robert II the Hard		12 May 1325; Amberg; Son of Adolph of the Rhine and Irmengard of Oettingen	16 January 1390 – 6 January 1398	Electorate of the Palatinate	Beatrice of Sicily; 1345 seven children	6 January 1398; Amberg aged 72	Nephew of Rudolph II and Robert I.
Regencies of Maddalena Visconti and Stephen III, Duke of Bavaria (1393–1401), John II, Duke of Bavaria (1393–97), Ernest, Duke of Bavaria and William III, Duke of Bavaria (1397–1401)							Annexed Ingolstadt in 1445.
Henry XVI the Rich		1386; Burghausen; Son of Frederick and Maddalena Visconti	4 December 1393 – 30 July 1450	Duchy of Landshut	Margaret of Austria; 25 November 1412; Landshut six children	30 July 1450; Landshut aged 75–76	Annexed Ingolstadt in 1445.
Ernest		1373; Munich; First son of John II and Catherine of Gorizia	1 July 1397 – 2 July 1438	Duchy of Munich	Elisabetta Visconti; 26 January 1395; Pfaffenhofen an der Ilm four children	2 July 1438; Munich aged 64–65	Children of John II, ruled jointly.
William III		1375; Munich; Second son of John II and Catherine of Gorizia	1 July 1397 – 12 September 1435	Duchy of Munich	Margaret of Cleves; 1433 two children	12 September 1435; Munich aged 59–60	Children of John II, ruled jointly.
Robert III the Righteous		5 May 1352; Amberg; Son of Robert II and Beatrice of Sicily	6 January 1398 – 18 May 1410	Electorate of the Palatinate	Elisabeth of Nuremberg; 27 June 1374; Amberg seven children	18 May 1410; Oppenheim aged 58	Also King of Germany (1400–1410).
William II of Oostervant		5 April 1365; The Hague; First son of Albert I and Margaret of Brzeg	13 December 1404 – 31 May 1417	Duchy of Straubing (with the Counties of Holland, Zeeland and Hainaut)	Margaret of Burgundy; 12 April 1385; Cambrai one child	31 May 1417; Bouchain aged 52	
Louis III the Bearded		23 January 1378; First son of Robert III and Elisabeth of Nuremberg	18 May 1410 – 30 December 1436	Electorate of the Palatinate	Blanche of England; 6 July 1402; Cologne no children Matilda of Savoy; 30 November 1417 five children	30 December 1436; Heidelberg aged 58	Children of Robert III, divided their inheritance. Stephen brought by marriage the County of Veldenz to his possessions, and, after his death, Zweibrücken split off from Simmern.
John I		1383; Neunburg vorm Wald; Second son of Robert III and Elisabeth of Nuremberg	18 May 1410 – 14 March 1443	County of Neumarkt	Catherine of Pomerania-Stolp; 15 August 1407; Ribe seven children	14 March 1443; Kastl aged 60	Children of Robert III, divided their inheritance. Stephen brought by marriage the County of Veldenz to his possessions, and, after his death, Zweibrücken split off from Simmern.
Stephen I		23 June 1385; Third son of Robert III and Elisabeth of Nuremberg	18 May 1410 – 14 February 1459	County of Simmern	Anna of Veldenz; 10 June 1410; Heidelberg eight children	14 February 1459; Simmern aged 73	Children of Robert III, divided their inheritance. Stephen brought by marriage the County of Veldenz to his possessions, and, after his death, Zweibrücken split off from Simmern.
Otto I		24 August 1390; Mosbach; Fourth son of Robert III and Elisabeth of Nuremberg	18 May 1410 – 5 July 1461	County of Mosbach	Johanna of Bavaria-Landshut; January 1430; Burghausen eight children	5 July 1461; Reichenbach aged 70	Children of Robert III, divided their inheritance. Stephen brought by marriage the County of Veldenz to his possessions, and, after his death, Zweibrücken split off from Simmern.
Louis VII the Bearded		1368; Son of Stephen III and Taddea Visconti	26 September 1413 – 1443	Duchy of Ingolstadt	Anne de Bourbon-La Marche; 1 October 1402 two children Catherine of Alençon; 1413 two children	1 May 1447 aged 78–79	Imprisoned by his son, who was allied with Henry XVI. Died in prison.
John III the Pitiless		1374; Le Quesnoy; Third son of Albert I and Margaret of Brzeg	31 May 1417 – 6 January 1425	Duchy of Straubing	Elizabeth I, Duchess of Luxembourg; 11418 no children	6 January 1425; The Hague aged 50/51	Heirs of William II, whose patimony was divided between them. Even so, John (who had been previously Bishop of Liège) contested the rights of Jacqueline in the Low Countries, where she also face the presssure of Philip the Good.
Jacqueline		15 July 1401; Le Quesnoy; Daughter of William II and Margaret of Burgundy	31 May 1417 – 12 April 1433	Counties of Holland, Zeeland and Hainaut	John, Dauphin of France; 6 August 1415; The Hague no children John IV, Duke of Brabant; 10 March 1418; The Hague (annulled 1422) no children Humphrey, Duke of Gloucester; February/March 1423; Hadleigh, Essex (in secret; annulled 1428) no children Frank van Borssele; 1434 no children	8 October 1436; Voorhout aged 35	Heirs of William II, whose patimony was divided between them. Even so, John (who had been previously Bishop of Liège) contested the rights of Jacqueline in the Low Countries, where she also face the presssure of Philip the Good.
Straubing definitively annexed by the remaining Bavarian duchies; the counties were annexed to the Duchy of Burgundy
Regency of Otto I, Count Palatine of Mosbach (1436–1442)							
Louis IV the Meek		1 January 1424; Heidelberg; First son of Louis III and Matilda of Savoy	30 December 1436 – 13 August 1449	Electorate of the Palatinate	Margaret of Savoy; 18 October 1445; Heidelberg one child	13 August 1449; Worms aged 25	
Albert III the Pious		27 March 1401; Wolfratshausen; Son of Ernest and Elisabetta Visconti	2 July 1438 – 29 February 1460	Duchy of Munich	Agnes Bernauer c. 1432? (morganatic) no children Anna of Brunswick-Grubenhagen; 22 January 1437; Munich ten children	29 February 1460; Munich aged 58	Son of Ernest.
Louis VIII the Hunchback		1 September 1403; Paris; Son of Louis VII and Anne de Bourbon-La Marche	1443 – 7 April 1445	Duchy of Ingolstadt	Unmarried	7 April 1445; Ingolstadt aged 41	After his death Ingolstadt was annexed by Landshut.
Ingolstadt annexed by Landshut
Christopher I		26 February 1416; Neumarkt in der Oberpfalz; Son of John I and Catherine of Pomerania-Stolp	14 March 1443 – 6 January 1448	County of Neumarkt	Dorothea of Brandenburg; 12 September 1445; Copenhagen no children	5/6 January 1448; Helsingborg aged 31	Also King of the Kalmar Union (1440–1448), in Denmark, Sweden and Norway. Left no descendants. Neumarkt reverted to Palatinate-Mosbach.
Neumarkt definitely annexed to Mosbach
Frederick I the Victorious		1 August 1425; Heidelberg; Second son of Louis III and Matilda of Savoy	13 August 1449 – 12 December 1476	Electorate of the Palatinate	Clara Tott; 1471/2 (morganatic) two children	12 December 1476; Heidelberg aged 51	Brother of his predecessor. As he left no legitimate heirs to the Electorate, he was succeeded by his nephew.
Louis IX the Rich		23 February 1417; Burghausen; Son of Henry XVI and Margaret of Austria	30 July 1450 – 18 January 1479	Duchy of Landshut	Amalia of Saxony; 21 March 1452; Landshut four children	18 January 1479; Landshut aged 61	
Frederick I the Pious		19 November 1417; First son of Stephen and Anna of Veldenz	14 February 1459 – 29 November 1480	County of Simmern	Margaret of Guelders; 6 August 1454; Lobith ten children	29 November 1480; Simmern aged 61	Children of Stephen, divided their inheritance.
Louis I the Black		1424; Second son of Stephen and Anna of Veldenz	14 February 1459 – 19 July 1489	County of Zweibrücken	Johanna de Croÿ; 20 March 1454; Luxembourg twelve children	19 July 1489; Simmern aged 64–65	Children of Stephen, divided their inheritance.
John IV		4 October 1437; Munich; First son of Albert III and Anna of Brunswick-Grubenhagen	29 February 1460 – 18 November 1463	Duchy of Munich	Unmarried	18 November 1463; Harthausen aged 26	Children of Albert III, shared their inheritance.In 1467, Sigismund moved to a seat in Dachau, but, as he left no descendants, it reunited again with Munich. Albert IV reunited the duchy in 1503 and, in 1506, decreed that the duchy should pass according to the rules of primogeniture.
Sigismund		26 July 1439; Munich; Second son of Albert III and Anna of Brunswick-Grubenhagen	29 February 1460 – 1 February 1501	Duchy of Munich (at Dachau)	Unmarried	1 February 1501; Blutenburg Castle aged 61	Children of Albert III, shared their inheritance.In 1467, Sigismund moved to a seat in Dachau, but, as he left no descendants, it reunited again with Munich. Albert IV reunited the duchy in 1503 and, in 1506, decreed that the duchy should pass according to the rules of primogeniture.
Albert IV the Wise		15 December 1447; Munich; Third son of Albert III and Anna of Brunswick-Grubenhagen	29 February 1460 – 1 December 1503	Duchy of Munich	Kunigunde of Austria; 3 January 1487; Munich seven children	18 March 1508; Munich aged 60	Children of Albert III, shared their inheritance.In 1467, Sigismund moved to a seat in Dachau, but, as he left no descendants, it reunited again with Munich. Albert IV reunited the duchy in 1503 and, in 1506, decreed that the duchy should pass according to the rules of primogeniture.
Albert IV the Wise		15 December 1447; Munich; Third son of Albert III and Anna of Brunswick-Grubenhagen	1 December 1503 – 18 March 1508	Duchy of Bavaria	Kunigunde of Austria; 3 January 1487; Munich seven children	18 March 1508; Munich aged 60	Children of Albert III, shared their inheritance.In 1467, Sigismund moved to a seat in Dachau, but, as he left no descendants, it reunited again with Munich. Albert IV reunited the duchy in 1503 and, in 1506, decreed that the duchy should pass according to the rules of primogeniture.
Dachau reunited with Munich
Otto II the Mathematician		26 June 1435; Mosbach; Son of Otto I and Johanna of Bavaria-Landshut	5 July 1461 – 4 October 1490	County of Mosbach	Unmarried	8 April 1499; Neumarkt in der Oberpfalz aged 63	Had a strong interest in astronomy and mathematics. Abdicated in 1490 to spend the remainder of his life in scientific pursuits. Mosbach reverted to the Electorate.
Mosbach definitely annexed to the Electorate of the Palatinate
Philip the Upright		14 July 1448; Heidelberg; Son of Louis IV and Margaret of Savoy	12 December 1476 – 28 February 1508	Electorate of the Palatinate	Margaret of Bavaria; 1474; Amberg fourteen children	28 February 1508; Germersheim aged 59	
George the Rich		15 August 1455; Burghausen; Son of Louis IX and Amalia of Saxony	18 January 1479 – 1 December 1503	Duchy of Landshut	Hedwig of Poland; 14 November 1475; Landshut five children	1 December 1503; Ingolstadt aged 48	At his death, he left his duchy to his only surviving daughter.
John I		15 May 1459; Starkenburg Castle; Son of Frederick I and Margaret of Guelders	29 November 1480 – 27 January 1509	County of Simmern	Joanna of Nassau-Saarbrücken; 29 September 1481 three children	27 January 1509; Starkenburg Castle aged 49	
Kaspar		11 July 1459; First son of Louis I and Johanna de Croÿ	19 July 1489 – 1490	County of Zweibrücken	Amalie of Brandenburg; 19 April 1478; Zweibrücken no children	1527; Veldenz Castle aged 67–68	Sons of Louis the Black, ruled jointly.
Alexander the Lame		26 November 1462; Second son of Louis I and Johanna de Croÿ	19 July 1489 – 21 October 1514	County of Zweibrücken	Margaret of Hohenlohe-Neuenstein; 1499; Zweibrücken six children	21 October 1514; Zweibrücken aged 51	Sons of Louis the Black, ruled jointly.
Elisabeth		1478; Burghausen; Daughter of George and Hedwig of Poland	1 December 1503 – 15 September 1504	Duchy of Landshut	Robert of the Palatinate; 10 February 1499 three children	15 September 1504; Landshut aged 25–26	Heiress of Landshut, according to her father's last will and testament of 1496. She fought the claim of Albert IV during the War of the Succession of Landshut, but, having less allies than her opponent, she eventually lost almost all of her territory.
Landshut (with exceptions) was annexed to Munich
Louis V the Pacific		2 July 1478; Heidelberg; First son of Philip and Margaret of Bavaria	28 February 1508 – 16 March 1544	Electorate of the Palatinate	Sibylle of Bavaria; 23 February 1511; Heidelberg no children	16 March 1544; Heidelberg aged 65	Children of Philip, left no descendants. Louis V was succeeded by a younger brother. Neumarkt reverted to the Electorate after Wolfgang's death.
Wolfgang the Elder		31 October 1494; Heidelberg; Third son of Philip and Margaret of Bavaria	28 February 1508 – 2 April 1558	Electorate of the Palatinate (at Neumarkt)	Unmarried	2 April 1558; Neumarkt in der Oberpfalz aged 63	Children of Philip, left no descendants. Louis V was succeeded by a younger brother. Neumarkt reverted to the Electorate after Wolfgang's death.
William IV the Steadfast		13 November 1493; Munich; First son of Albert IV and Kunigunde of Austria	18 March 1508 – 7 March 1550	Duchy of Bavaria	Jakobaea of Baden; 5 October 1522; Munich four children	7 March 1550; Munich aged 56	Children of Albert IV. Though their father had determined the everlasting succession of only the firstborn prince in 1506, Louis, as a second-born son, refused a spiritual career with the argument that he was born before the edict became valid. As so, the brotheres shared their rule, with Louis X taking the seats of Landshut and Straubing.
Louis X		18 September 1495; Grünwald; Second son of Albert IV and Kunigunde of Austria	17 February 1514 – 22 April 1545	Duchy of Bavaria (in Landshut and Straubing)	Unmarried	22 April 1545; Landshut aged 49	Children of Albert IV. Though their father had determined the everlasting succession of only the firstborn prince in 1506, Louis, as a second-born son, refused a spiritual career with the argument that he was born before the edict became valid. As so, the brotheres shared their rule, with Louis X taking the seats of Landshut and Straubing.
John II		21 March 1492; Simmern; Son of John I and Joanna of Nassau-Saarbrücken	27 January 1509 – 18 May 1557	County of Simmern	Beatrix of Baden; 22 May 1508 twelve children	18 May 1557; Simmern aged 65	He introduced the Reformation into Simmern which led to increased tensions with his neighbours, the Archbishoprics of Trier and Mainz.
Louis II the Younger		14 September 1502; Zweibrücken; First son of Alexander and Margaret of Hohenlohe-Neuenstein	21 October 1514 – 3 December 1532	County of Zweibrücken	Elisabeth of Hesse; 10 September 1525; Kassel two children	3 December 1532; Zweibrücken aged 30	
Robert		1506; Zweibrücken; Second son of Alexander and Margaret of Hohenlohe-Neuenstein	3 December 1532 – 28 July 1544	County of Veldenz	Ursula of Salm-Kyrburg; 23 June 1537 three children	28 July 1544; Gräfenstein Castle aged 37–38	Divided the land. Robert was a younger brother of Louis II, and Wolfgang was Louis' son. Technically, Robert held both lands during Wolfgang's minority.
Regency of Robert, Count Palatine of Veldenz (1532–1543)							Divided the land. Robert was a younger brother of Louis II, and Wolfgang was Louis' son. Technically, Robert held both lands during Wolfgang's minority.
Wolfgang		26 September 1526; Zweibrücken; Son of Louis II and Elisabeth of Hesse	3 December 1532 – 11 June 1569	County of Zweibrücken	Anna of Hesse; 24 February 1544 thirteen children	11 June 1569; Nexon aged 42	Divided the land. Robert was a younger brother of Louis II, and Wolfgang was Louis' son. Technically, Robert held both lands during Wolfgang's minority.
Frederick II the Wise		9 December 1482; Neustadt an der Weinstraße; Second son of Philip and Margaret of Bavaria	16 March 1544 – 26 December 1556	Electorate of the Palatinate	Dorothea of Denmark; 18 May 1535; Heidelberg no children	26 December 1556; Alzey aged 73	Left no descendants. He was succeeded by a cousin.
Regencies of Ursula of Salm-Kyrburg (1544–1546) and Wolfgang, Count Palatine of Zweibrücken (1544–1560)							
George John I the Astute		11 April 1543; Son of Robert and Ursula of Salm-Kyrburg	28 July 1544 – 18 April 1592	County of Veldenz	Anna of Sweden; 20 December 1562 eleven children	18 April 1592; Lützelstein aged 49	
Albert V the Magnanimous	Albert V	29 February 1528; Munich; Son of William IV and Jakobaea of Baden	7 March 1550 – 24 October 1579	Duchy of Bavaria	Anna of Austria; 4 July 1546; Regensburg seven children	24 October 1579; Munich aged 51	
Regencies of Philip, Elector Palatine (1504–1508) and Frederick II, Elector Palatine (1508–1516)							Paternal grandsons of Philip, Elector Palatine, and maternal grandsons of George, Duke of Landshut. In the aftermath of the War of the Succession of Landshut, a part of Landshut who did not join Bavaria formed the County of Neuburg. In 1556, Otto Henry, count of Neuburg, inherited the Electoral title, and abdicated the county. Neuburg fell then to the County of Zweibrücken. Also, Otto Henry's death marked the end of the main line of Electors: the Simmern line ascended to the Electoral position.
Otto Henry the Magnanimous		10 April 1502; Amberg; First son of Robert of the Palatinate and Elisabeth	15 September 1504 – 26 December 1556	Duchy of Landshut (in Neuburg) Repurposed as: County of Neuburg	Susanna of Bavaria; 16 October 1529; Neuburg an der Donau no children	12 February 1559; Heidelberg aged 56	Paternal grandsons of Philip, Elector Palatine, and maternal grandsons of George, Duke of Landshut. In the aftermath of the War of the Succession of Landshut, a part of Landshut who did not join Bavaria formed the County of Neuburg. In 1556, Otto Henry, count of Neuburg, inherited the Electoral title, and abdicated the county. Neuburg fell then to the County of Zweibrücken. Also, Otto Henry's death marked the end of the main line of Electors: the Simmern line ascended to the Electoral position.
Otto Henry the Magnanimous		10 April 1502; Amberg; First son of Robert of the Palatinate and Elisabeth	26 December 1556 – 12 February 1559	Electorate of the Palatinate	Susanna of Bavaria; 16 October 1529; Neuburg an der Donau no children	12 February 1559; Heidelberg aged 56	Paternal grandsons of Philip, Elector Palatine, and maternal grandsons of George, Duke of Landshut. In the aftermath of the War of the Succession of Landshut, a part of Landshut who did not join Bavaria formed the County of Neuburg. In 1556, Otto Henry, count of Neuburg, inherited the Electoral title, and abdicated the county. Neuburg fell then to the County of Zweibrücken. Also, Otto Henry's death marked the end of the main line of Electors: the Simmern line ascended to the Electoral position.
Philip the Warlike		12 November 1503; Heidelberg; Second son of Robert of the Palatinate and Elisabeth	15 September 1504 – 1541	Duchy of Landshut (in Neuburg) Repurposed as: County of Neuburg	Unmarried	4 July 1548; Heidelberg aged 44	Paternal grandsons of Philip, Elector Palatine, and maternal grandsons of George, Duke of Landshut. In the aftermath of the War of the Succession of Landshut, a part of Landshut who did not join Bavaria formed the County of Neuburg. In 1556, Otto Henry, count of Neuburg, inherited the Electoral title, and abdicated the county. Neuburg fell then to the County of Zweibrücken. Also, Otto Henry's death marked the end of the main line of Electors: the Simmern line ascended to the Electoral position.
Neuburg briefly annexed to Zweibrücken (1559–1569)
Frederick III the Pious		14 February 1515; Simmern; First son of John II and Beatrix of Baden	18 May 1557 – 12 February 1559	County of Simmern	Marie of Brandenburg-Kulmbach; 21 October 1537; Kreuznach eleven children Amalia of Neuenahr; 25 April 1569; Heidelberg no children	26 October 1576; Heidelberg aged 61	When the senior branch of the family died out in 1559, the electorate passed to Frederick III of Simmern, son of John II and a staunch Calvinist. The Palatinate became one of the major centers of Calvinism in Europe, supporting Calvinist rebellions in both the Netherlands and France.
Frederick III the Pious		14 February 1515; Simmern; First son of John II and Beatrix of Baden	12 February 1559 – 26 October 1576	Electorate of the Palatinate (Simmern line)	Marie of Brandenburg-Kulmbach; 21 October 1537; Kreuznach eleven children Amalia of Neuenahr; 25 April 1569; Heidelberg no children	26 October 1576; Heidelberg aged 61	When the senior branch of the family died out in 1559, the electorate passed to Frederick III of Simmern, son of John II and a staunch Calvinist. The Palatinate became one of the major centers of Calvinism in Europe, supporting Calvinist rebellions in both the Netherlands and France.
George		20 February 1518; Second son of John II and Beatrix of Baden	12 February 1559 – 17 May 1569	County of Simmern	Elisabeth of Hesse; 9 January 1541 one child	17 May 1569; Simmern aged 51	Left no descendants. He was succeeded by his brother.
Richard		25 July 1521; Simmern; Third son of John II and Beatrix of Baden	17 May 1569 – 13 January 1598	County of Simmern	Julianna of Wied; 30 January 1569 four children Emilie of Württemberg; 26 March 1578 no children Anne Margaret of Palatinate-Veldenz; 14 December 1589 no children	13 January 1598; Ravengiersburg aged 76	Left no descendants. Simmern returned to the Electorate.
Simmern briefly annexed to the Electoral Palatinate (1598–1610)
Regency of Anna of Hesse, William IV, Landgrave of Hesse-Kassel and Louis VI, Elector Palatine (1569–1574)							Children of Wolfgang, divided their inheritance: John received Zweibrücken; Frederick received Vohenstrauss-Parkstein, which after his death with no descendants went to Neuburg; Otto Henry received Sulzbach, which after his death with no descendants went to Neuburg; Charles received Birkenfeld; Philip Louis (the eldest son) received Neuburg, and absorbed his childless brothers land after their deaths.
Philip Louis		2 October 1547; Zweibrücken; First son of Wolfgang and Anna of Hesse	11 June 1569 – 22 August 1614	County of Neuburg	Anna of Cleves; 27 September 1574; Neuburg an der Donau eight children	22 August 1614; Neuburg an der Donau aged 66	Children of Wolfgang, divided their inheritance: John received Zweibrücken; Frederick received Vohenstrauss-Parkstein, which after his death with no descendants went to Neuburg; Otto Henry received Sulzbach, which after his death with no descendants went to Neuburg; Charles received Birkenfeld; Philip Louis (the eldest son) received Neuburg, and absorbed his childless brothers land after their deaths.
John I the Lame		8 May 1550; Meisenheim; Second son of Wolfgang and Anna of Hesse	11 June 1569 – 12 August 1604	County of Zweibrücken	Magdalene of Jülich-Cleves-Berg; 1579; Bad Bergzabern nine children	12 August 1604; Germersheim aged 54	Children of Wolfgang, divided their inheritance: John received Zweibrücken; Frederick received Vohenstrauss-Parkstein, which after his death with no descendants went to Neuburg; Otto Henry received Sulzbach, which after his death with no descendants went to Neuburg; Charles received Birkenfeld; Philip Louis (the eldest son) received Neuburg, and absorbed his childless brothers land after their deaths.
Frederick		11 April 1557; Meisenheim; Third son of Wolfgang and Anna of Hesse	11 June 1569 – 17 December 1597	County of Zweibrücken (at Vohenstrauss and Parkstein)	Katharina Sophie of Legnica; 26 February 1587 three children	17 December 1597; Vohenstrauß aged 40	Children of Wolfgang, divided their inheritance: John received Zweibrücken; Frederick received Vohenstrauss-Parkstein, which after his death with no descendants went to Neuburg; Otto Henry received Sulzbach, which after his death with no descendants went to Neuburg; Charles received Birkenfeld; Philip Louis (the eldest son) received Neuburg, and absorbed his childless brothers land after their deaths.
Charles I		4 September 1560; Neuburg an der Donau; Fourth son of Wolfgang and Anna of Hesse	11 June 1569 – 16 December 1600	County of Birkenfeld	Dorothea of Brunswick-Lüneburg; 23 November 1590 four children	16 December 1600; Birkenfeld aged 40	Children of Wolfgang, divided their inheritance: John received Zweibrücken; Frederick received Vohenstrauss-Parkstein, which after his death with no descendants went to Neuburg; Otto Henry received Sulzbach, which after his death with no descendants went to Neuburg; Charles received Birkenfeld; Philip Louis (the eldest son) received Neuburg, and absorbed his childless brothers land after their deaths.
Otto Henry		22 July 1567; Amberg; Fifth son of Wolfgang and Anna of Hesse	11 June 1569 – 29 August 1604	County of Sulzbach	Dorothea Maria of Württemberg; 25 November 1582 thirteen children	29 August 1604; Sulzbach aged 48	Children of Wolfgang, divided their inheritance: John received Zweibrücken; Frederick received Vohenstrauss-Parkstein, which after his death with no descendants went to Neuburg; Otto Henry received Sulzbach, which after his death with no descendants went to Neuburg; Charles received Birkenfeld; Philip Louis (the eldest son) received Neuburg, and absorbed his childless brothers land after their deaths.
Vohenstrauss-Parkstein and Sulzbach annexed to Neuburg
Louis VI the Careless		4 July 1539; Simmern; First son of Frederick III and Marie of Brandenburg-Kulmbach	26 October 1576 – 22 October 1583	Electorate of the Palatinate (Simmern line)	Elisabeth of Hesse; 8 July 1560; Marburg twelve children Anne of Ostfriesland; 12 July 1583; Heidelberg no children	22 October 1583; Heidelberg aged 44	Children of Frederick III, divided the land: Louis received the Electorate, and John Casimir was given a portion at Lautern. The latter did not have descendants, and his portion returned to the Electorate.
John Casimir		7 March 1543; Simmern; Second son of Frederick III and Marie of Brandenburg-Kulmbach	26 October 1576 – 16 January 1592	County of Simmern (at Lautern)	Elisabeth of Saxony; 4 June 1570; Heidelberg no children	16 January 1592; Heidelberg aged 48	Children of Frederick III, divided the land: Louis received the Electorate, and John Casimir was given a portion at Lautern. The latter did not have descendants, and his portion returned to the Electorate.
Lautern reabsorbed in the Electorate
William V the Pious	William V	29 September 1548; Landshut; Son of Albert V and Anna of Austria	24 October 1579 – 15 October 1597	Duchy of Bavaria	Renata of Lorraine; 22 February 1568; Munich ten children	7 February 1626; Schleissheim Palace aged 77	In 1597, he abdicated in favor of his son.
Regency of John Casimir, Count of Lautern (1583–1592)							With his advisor Christian of Anhalt, he founded the Evangelical Union of Protestant states in 1608.
Frederick IV the Righteous		5 March 1574; Amberg; Son of Louis VI and Elisabeth of Hesse	22 October 1583 – 19 September 1610	Electorate of the Palatinate (Simmern line)	Louise Juliana of Orange-Nassau; 23 June 1593; Dillenburg eight children	19 September 1610; Heidelberg aged 36	With his advisor Christian of Anhalt, he founded the Evangelical Union of Protestant states in 1608.
Regency of Anna of Sweden (1592–1598)							Children of George John I, ruled jointly. In 1598 divided the land: George Gustavus kept Veldenz; John Augustus received Lützelstein; and Louis Philip and George John received jointly received Gutenberg. In 1601 George John ruled alone Gutenberg. In 1611, after the death of John Augustus with no descendants, Lützelstein was annexed to Guttenberg. In 1654, after the death of George John without descendants, Guttenberg reverted to Veldenz, united under Leopold Louis, George Gustavus' son.
George Gustavus		6 February 1564; Michelsburg; First son of George John I and Anna of Sweden	18 April 1592 – 3 June 1634	County of Veldenz	Elisabeth of Württemberg; 30 October 1586; Stuttgart no children Maria Elisabeth of the Palatinate-Zweibrücken; Zweibrücken; 17 May 1601 eleven children	3 June 1634; Lützelstein aged 70	Children of George John I, ruled jointly. In 1598 divided the land: George Gustavus kept Veldenz; John Augustus received Lützelstein; and Louis Philip and George John received jointly received Gutenberg. In 1601 George John ruled alone Gutenberg. In 1611, after the death of John Augustus with no descendants, Lützelstein was annexed to Guttenberg. In 1654, after the death of George John without descendants, Guttenberg reverted to Veldenz, united under Leopold Louis, George Gustavus' son.
John Augustus		26 November 1575; Lemberg Castle; Second son of George John I and Anna of Sweden	18 April 1592 – 18 September 1611	County of Veldenz (at Lützelstein)	Anna Elisabeth of the Palatinate; 1599 no children	18 September 1611; Lemberg Castle aged 35	Children of George John I, ruled jointly. In 1598 divided the land: George Gustavus kept Veldenz; John Augustus received Lützelstein; and Louis Philip and George John received jointly received Gutenberg. In 1601 George John ruled alone Gutenberg. In 1611, after the death of John Augustus with no descendants, Lützelstein was annexed to Guttenberg. In 1654, after the death of George John without descendants, Guttenberg reverted to Veldenz, united under Leopold Louis, George Gustavus' son.
Louis Philip		24 November 1577; Third son of George John I and Anna of Sweden	18 April 1592 – 24 October 1601	County of Veldenz (at Gutenberg)	Unmarried	24 October 1601; Heidelberg aged 23	Children of George John I, ruled jointly. In 1598 divided the land: George Gustavus kept Veldenz; John Augustus received Lützelstein; and Louis Philip and George John received jointly received Gutenberg. In 1601 George John ruled alone Gutenberg. In 1611, after the death of John Augustus with no descendants, Lützelstein was annexed to Guttenberg. In 1654, after the death of George John without descendants, Guttenberg reverted to Veldenz, united under Leopold Louis, George Gustavus' son.
George John II		24 June 1586; Lützelstein; Fourth son of George John I and Anna of Sweden	18 April 1592 – 29 September 1654	County of Veldenz (at Gutenberg)	Susanna of Palatinate-Sulzbach; 20 December 1562 eleven children	29 September 1654 aged 68	Children of George John I, ruled jointly. In 1598 divided the land: George Gustavus kept Veldenz; John Augustus received Lützelstein; and Louis Philip and George John received jointly received Gutenberg. In 1601 George John ruled alone Gutenberg. In 1611, after the death of John Augustus with no descendants, Lützelstein was annexed to Guttenberg. In 1654, after the death of George John without descendants, Guttenberg reverted to Veldenz, united under Leopold Louis, George Gustavus' son.
Maximilian I the Great	Maximilian I	17 April 1573; Munich; First son of William V and Renata of Lorraine	15 October 1597 – 27 September 1651	Duchy of Bavaria (until 1623) Electorate of Bavaria (from 1623)	Elisabeth of Lorraine; 9 February 1595; Nancy no children Maria Anna of Austria; 15 July 1635; Vienna two children	27 September 1651; Ingolstadt aged 78	Children of William V. Maximilian I, was an ally of Emperor Ferdinand II in the Thirty Years' War. When the Elector of the Palatinate, Frederick V, head of a senior branch of the Wittelsbachs, became involved in the war against the Emperor, he was stripped of his Imperial offices and the Prince-elector title. Maximilian I was granted the Electorate of the Palatinate in 1623. Albert VI inherited from his wife the lands of Leuchtenberg, and from 1646 reorganizes them as a new Bavarian duchy, the short-lived Duchy of Bavaria-Leuchtenberg. In 1650 Albert made an exchange with Maximilian: Leuchtenberg went to the latter's second son, while Albert received the County of Haag, which he kept until his death and then reverted to Bavaria.
Albert VI	Albert VI	26 February 1584; Munich; Second son of William V and Renata of Lorraine	1 November 1646 - 1650	Duchy of Leuchtenberg	Mechtild of Leuchtenberg; 8 December 1650 five children	5 July 1666; Munich aged 82	
Albert VI	Albert VI	26 February 1584; Munich; Second son of William V and Renata of Lorraine	1650 - 5 July 1666	County of Haag	Mechtild of Leuchtenberg; 8 December 1650 five children	5 July 1666; Munich aged 82	
Haag reverted to Bavaria
Regency of Philip Louis, Count Palatine of Neuburg (1600–1612) and John I, Count Palatine of Zweibrücken (1600–1604)							Children of Charles I, divided their inheritance
George William		6 August 1591; Ansbach; First son of Charles I and Dorothea of Brunswick-Lüneburg	16 December 1600 – 25 December 1669	County of Birkenfeld	Dorothea of Solms-Sonnenwalde; 30 November 1616 six children Juliana of Salm-Grumbach; 30 November 1641 no children Anna Elisabeth of Oettingen-Oettingen; 8 March 1649 no children	25 December 1669; Birkenfeld aged 78	Children of Charles I, divided their inheritance
Christian I		3 November 1598; Birkenfeld; Second son of Charles I and Dorothea of Brunswick-Lüneburg	16 December 1600 – 6 September 1654	County of Birkenfeld (at Bischweiler)	Magdalene Catherine of Palatinate-Zweibrücken; 14 November 1630 nine children Maria Joanna of Helfenstein-Wiesensteig; 28 October 1648 one child	6 September 1654; Neuenstein aged 55	Children of Charles I, divided their inheritance
John II the Younger		26 March 1584; Bad Bergzabern; First son of John I and Magdalene of Jülich-Cleves-Berg	12 August 1604 – 9 August 1635	County of Zweibrücken	Catherine de Rohan; 26 August 1604 one child Louise Juliana of the Palatinate; 13 May 1612 seven children	9 August 1635; Metz aged 51	Children of John I, divided their inheritance.
Frederick Casimir		10 June 1585; Zweibrücken; Second son of John I and Magdalene of Jülich-Cleves-Berg	12 August 1604 – 30 September 1645	County of Zweibrücken at Landsberg)	Emilia Antwerpiana of Orange-Nassau; 4 July 1616; Landsberg three children	30 September 1645; Montfort-en-Auxois aged 60	Children of John I, divided their inheritance.
John Casimir		20 April 1589; Zweibrücken; Third son of John I and Magdalene of Jülich-Cleves-Berg	12 August 1604 – 18 June 1652	County of Kleeburg	Catherine of Sweden; 11 June 1615; Stockholm eight children	18 June 1652; Stegeborg Castle aged 63	Children of John I, divided their inheritance.
Frederick V the Winter King		26 August 1596; Deinschwang; First son of Frederick IV and Louise Juliana of Orange-Nassau	19 September 1610 – 23 February 1623	Electorate of the Palatinate (Simmern line)	Elizabeth of Great Britain; 14 February 1613; London thirteen children	29 November 1632; Mainz aged 36	Children of Frederick IV. In 1610, after their father's death, the younger son, Louis Philip, restored the county of Simmern, while Frederick V, in 1619, accepted the throne of Bohemia - where he was known as "the Winter King" because his reign in Bohemia only lasted one winter - from the Bohemian estates. Frederick V was defeated by the Emperor Ferdinand II at the Battle of White Mountain in 1620, and Spanish and Bavarian troops soon occupied the Palatinate itself. In 1623, Frederick was put under the ban of the Empire.
Louis Philip		23 November 1602; Heidelberg; Second son of Frederick IV and Louise Juliana of Orange-Nassau	19 September 1610 – 6 January 1655	County of Simmern	Maria Eleonora of Brandenburg; 4 December 1631 seven children	6 January 1655; Krosno Odrzańskie aged 52	
Frederick V's territories and his position as elector were transferred to the Duke of Bavaria, Maximilian I, of a distantly related branch of the House of Wittelsbach. Although technically Elector Palatine, he was known as the Elector of Bavaria. From 1648 he ruled in Bavaria and the Upper Palatinate alone, but retained all his electoral dignities and the seniority of the Palatinate Electorate. Electoral Palatinate briefly annexed to the Electorate of Bavaria (1623–1648)
Wolfgang William		4 November 1578; Neuburg an der Donau; First son of Philip Louis and |Anna of Cleves	22 August 1614 – 14 September 1653	County of Neuburg	Magdalene of Bavaria; 11 November 1613; Munich one child Catharina Charlotte of Palatinate-Zweibrücken; 11 November 1631; Blieskastel two children Maria Franziska of Fürstenberg-Heiligenberg; 3 June 1651 no children	14 September 1653; Düsseldorf aged 74	Children of Philip Louis, divided their inheritance. The younger sons inherited Sulzbach but had different seats: John Frederick created Palatinate-Sulzbach-Hilpoltstein, but at his death with no surviving children, Sulzbach became reunited under Augustus' son, Christian August.
Augustus		2 October 1582; Neuburg an der Donau; Second son of Philip Louis and |Anna of Cleves	22 August 1614 – 14 August 1632	County of Sulzbach	Hedwig of Holstein-Gottorp; 17 July 1620 seven children	14 August 1632; Bad Windsheim aged 49	Children of Philip Louis, divided their inheritance. The younger sons inherited Sulzbach but had different seats: John Frederick created Palatinate-Sulzbach-Hilpoltstein, but at his death with no surviving children, Sulzbach became reunited under Augustus' son, Christian August.
John Frederick		23 August 1587; Neuburg an der Donau; Third son of Philip Louis and |Anna of Cleves	22 August 1614 – 19 October 1644	County of Sulzbach (at Hilpoltstein)	Sophie Agnes of Hesse-Darmstadt; 7/17 November 1624 eight children	19 October 1644; Hilpoltstein aged 57	Children of Philip Louis, divided their inheritance. The younger sons inherited Sulzbach but had different seats: John Frederick created Palatinate-Sulzbach-Hilpoltstein, but at his death with no surviving children, Sulzbach became reunited under Augustus' son, Christian August.
Regency of John Frederick, Count Palatine of Sulzbach-Hilpoltstein (1632–1636)							Reunited Sulzbach after John Frederick's death in 1644.
Christian Augustus		26 July 1622; Sulzbach; Son of Augustus and Hedwig of Holstein-Gottorp	14 August 1632 – 23 July 1708	County of Sulzbach	Amalie of Nassau-Siegen; 27 March 1649 five children	23 July 1708; Sulzbach aged 85	Reunited Sulzbach after John Frederick's death in 1644.
Regency of George John II, Count Palatine of Lützelstein-Guttenberg (1634–1639)							Reunited Palatinate-Veldenz in 1654. However, left no surviving male descendants. Veldenz went to the Electorate.
Leopold Louis		1 February 1625; Lauterecken; Son of George Gustavus and Maria Elisabeth of the Palatinate-Zweibrücken	3 June 1634 – 29 September 1694	County of Veldenz	Agatha Christine of Hanau-Lichtenberg; 4 July 1648; Bischweiler twelve children	29 September 1694; Strasbourg aged 69	Reunited Palatinate-Veldenz in 1654. However, left no surviving male descendants. Veldenz went to the Electorate.
Veldenz definitely annexed to the Electoral Palatinate
Frederick		5 April 1619; Son of John II and Catherine de Rohan	9 August 1635 – 9 July 1661	County of Zweibrücken	Anna Juliana of Nassau-Saarbrücken; 6 April 1640 ten children	9 July 1661	Left no male surviving descendants. Zweibrucken was inherited by his sister and her husband.
Charles I Louis		22 December 1617; Heidelberg; Son of Frederick V and Elizabeth of Great Britain	24 October 1648 – 28 August 1680	Electorate of the Palatinate (Simmern line, restored)	Charlotte of Hesse-Kassel; 22 February 1650; Kassel (unilateral divorce in 1658) three children Marie Luise von Degenfeld; 6 January 1658; Schwetzingen (morganatic and bigamous) thirteen children Elisabeth Hollander von Bernau; 11 December 1679; Vohenstrauß (morganatic) one child	28 August 1680 near Edingen-Neckarhausen aged 62	By the Peace of Westphalia in 1648, Charles Louis was restored to the Lower Palatinate and was given a new electoral title, also that of "Elector Palatine" but lower in precedence than the other electorates.
Regency of Albert VI, Duke of Bavaria (1651-1654)							In 1650, Maximilian Philip, second son of Maximilian, received the Duchy of Leuchtenberg, from which his uncle Albert VI had abdicated. His childless death led to the union of the Bavarian Leuchtenberg lands and the Electorate.
Ferdinand Maria	Ferdinand Maria	31 October 1636; Schleissheim Palace; First son of Maximilian I and Maria Anna of Austria	27 September 1651 – 26 May 1679	Electorate of Bavaria	Henriette Adelaide of Savoy; 8 December 1650 eight children	26 May 1679; Schleissheim Palace aged 42	In 1650, Maximilian Philip, second son of Maximilian, received the Duchy of Leuchtenberg, from which his uncle Albert VI had abdicated. His childless death led to the union of the Bavarian Leuchtenberg lands and the Electorate.
Maximilian Philip Hieronymus	Maximilian Philip	30 September 1638; Munich; Second son of Maximilian I and Maria Anna of Austria	1650 - 20 March 1705	Duchy of Leuchtenberg	Mauricienne Fébronie de La Tour d'Auvergne (1652–1706); 1668; Château-Thierry no children	20 March 1705; Türkheim aged 66	In 1650, Maximilian Philip, second son of Maximilian, received the Duchy of Leuchtenberg, from which his uncle Albert VI had abdicated. His childless death led to the union of the Bavarian Leuchtenberg lands and the Electorate.
Leuchtenberg re-merged in the Electorate of Bavaria
Charles Gustavus		8 November 1622; Nyköping Castle; First son of John Casimir and Catherine of Sweden	18 June 1652 – 6 June 1654	County of Kleeburg	Hedwig Eleonora of Holstein-Gottorp; 24 October 1654; Stockholm one child	13 February 1660; Gothenburg aged 37	Abdicated from Kleeburg in 1654, to become King of Sweden (as Charles X), right hat he inherited from his mother.
Adolph John I		21 October 1629; Stegeborg Castle; Second son of John Casimir and Catherine of Sweden	6 June 1654 – 24 October 1689	County of Kleeburg	Elsa Beata Brahe; 19 June 1649; Stockholm one child Elsa Elisabeth Brahe; 1661; Stockholm nine children	24 October 1689; Stegeborg Castle aged 60	Brother of Charles Gustavus, received Kleeburg after the abdication of his brother.
Louis Henry		11 October 1640; Sedan; Son of Louis Philip and Maria Eleonora of Brandenburg	6 January 1655 – 3 January 1674	County of Simmern	Maria of Orange-Nassau; 23 September 1666; Kleve no children	3 January 1674; Bad Kreuznach aged 33	Left no descendants. Simmern returned to the Electorate.
Simmern definitely annexed to the Electoral Palatinate
Juliana Magdalena		23 April 1621; Heidelberg; Daughter of John II and Catherine de Rohan	9 July 1661 – 25 March 1672	County of Zweibrücken	Frederick Louis; 14 November 1645; Düsseldorf thirteen children	25 March 1672; Meisenheim aged 51	Juliana was a younger sister of Frederick and likely the intended heiress, as it was the cousin from Landsberg (and not the one from Kleeburg), to whom she was married and the one who effectively inherited the county of Zweibrücken. Originally ruling at Palatinate-Landsberg – merged with Zweibrücken after his wife's inheritance –, Frederick Louis survived his wife, but in 1677 the Kingdom of France occupied his counties. He left no surviving descendants. And only then the Kleeburg line (the Swedish one) came to inherit Zweibrücken.
Frederick Louis		27 October 1619; Heidelberg; Son of Frederick Casimir, Count of Landsberg and Emilia Antwerpiana of Orange-Nassau	9 July 1661 – 11 April 1681	County of Zweibrücken (in Landsberg 1645-1661)	Juliana Magdalena; 14 November 1645; Düsseldorf thirteen children Anna Marie Elisabeth Hepp; 21 August 1672 (morganatic) five children	11 April 1681; Landsberg Castle aged 61	
Charles Otto		5 September 1625; Birkenfeld; Son of George William and Dorothea of Solms-Sonnenwalde	25 December 1669 – 30 March 1671	County of Birkenfeld	Margaret Hedwig of Hohenlohe-Neuenstein; 26 September 1658 three children	30 March 1671; Birkenfeld aged 45	Left no surviving descendants. Birkenfeld passed to Bischweiler line.
Christian II		22 June 1637; Bischweiler; First son of Christian I and Magdalene Catherine of Palatinate-Zweibrücken	30 March 1671 – 26 April 1717	County of Birkenfeld (in Bischweiler 1654-1671)	Catherine Agatha of Rappoltstein; 5 September 1667 seven children	26 April 1717; Birkenfeld aged 79	Children of Christian I. Christian II kept Bischweiler, while his brother John Charles gained Gelnhausen. Christian II inherited, in 1671, Birkenfeld from his cousin Charles Otto, and annexed Bischweiler to it.
John Charles		17 October 1638; Bischweiler; Second son of Christian I and Magdalene Catherine of Palatinate-Zweibrücken	6 September 1654 – 21 February 1704	County of Gelnhausen	Sophie Amalie of Palatinate-Zweibrücken; 1685; Weikersheim one child Esther Maria von Witzleben; 28 July 1696 five children	21 February 1704; Gelnhausen aged 65	Children of Christian I. Christian II kept Bischweiler, while his brother John Charles gained Gelnhausen. Christian II inherited, in 1671, Birkenfeld from his cousin Charles Otto, and annexed Bischweiler to it.
Bischweiler reannexed to Birkenfeld, though ruled by Bischweiler line
Regency of Maximilian Philipp Hieronymus, Duke of Leuchtenberg (1679-1680)							Took part in the War of the Spanish Succession on the side of France, against Leopold I, Holy Roman Emperor. He was accordingly forced to flee Bavaria following the Battle of Blenheim and deprived of his Electorate on 29 April 1706. He regained his Electorate in 1714 by the Peace of Baden and ruled until 1726.
Maximilian II Emanuel	Maximilian II Emanuel	11 July 1662; Munich; Son of Ferdinand Maria and Henriette Adelaide of Savoy	26 May 1679 – 26 February 1726	Electorate of Bavaria	Maria Antonia of Austria; 15 July 1685; Vienna three children Theresa Kunegunda Sobieska; 15 August 1694; Warsaw (by proxy) ten children	26 February 1726; Munich aged 63	Took part in the War of the Spanish Succession on the side of France, against Leopold I, Holy Roman Emperor. He was accordingly forced to flee Bavaria following the Battle of Blenheim and deprived of his Electorate on 29 April 1706. He regained his Electorate in 1714 by the Peace of Baden and ruled until 1726.
Charles II		10 April 1651; Heidelberg; Son of Charles I Louis and Charlotte of Hesse-Kassel	28 August 1680 – 26 May 1685	Electorate of the Palatinate (Simmern line)	Wilhelmine Ernestine of Denmark; 20 September 1671; Heidelberg no children	26 May 1685; Heidelberg aged 34	Last of Simmern line. The Electorate was inherited by the Counts of Neuburg branch.
Charles I		24 November 1655; Tre Kronor; Son of Charles Gustavus, Count of Kleeburg and Hedwig Eleonora of Holstein-Gottorp	11 April 1681 – 5 April 1697	County of Zweibrücken	Ulrika Eleonora of Denmark; 6 May 1680; Skottorp seven children	5 April 1697; Tre Kronor aged 41	Son of Charles Gustavus (Charles X of Sweden), assumed the restored Palatinate-Zweibrücken. Also King of Sweden, as Charles XI.
Philip William		24 November 1615; Giessen; Son of Wolfgang William and Magdalene of Bavaria	1653 – 26 May 1685	County of Neuburg	Anna Catherine of Poland; 8 June 1642; Warsaw no children Elisabeth Amalie of Hesse-Darmstadt; 3 September 1653; Bad Schwalbach seventeen children	2 September 1690; Vienna aged 74	When the Simmern branch of the family died out in 1685, the electorate passed to Philip William of Neuburg (also Duke of Jülich and Berg). He was a Catholic and a maternal nephew of Maximilian I, Elector of Bavaria.
Philip William		24 November 1615; Giessen; Son of Wolfgang William and Magdalene of Bavaria	26 May 1685 – 2 September 1690	Electorate of the Palatinate (Neuburg line)	Anna Catherine of Poland; 8 June 1642; Warsaw no children Elisabeth Amalie of Hesse-Darmstadt; 3 September 1653; Bad Schwalbach seventeen children	2 September 1690; Vienna aged 74	When the Simmern branch of the family died out in 1685, the electorate passed to Philip William of Neuburg (also Duke of Jülich and Berg). He was a Catholic and a maternal nephew of Maximilian I, Elector of Bavaria.
Adolph John II		21 August 1666; Bergzabern; First son of Adolph John I and Elsa Elisabeth Brahe	24 October 1689 – 27 April 1701	County of Kleeburg	Unmarried	27 April 1701; Laiuse Castle aged 34	Left no descendants. His lands went to his brother, Gustavus.
John William		19 April 1658; Düsseldorf; First son of Philip William and Elisabeth Amalie of Hesse-Darmstadt	2 September 1690 – 8 June 1716	Electorate of the Palatinate (Neuburg line)	Maria Anna Josepha of Austria; 25 October 1678; Wiener Neustadt two children Anna Maria Luisa de' Medici; 6 May 1691; Innsbruck no children	8 June 1716; Düsseldorf aged 58	Left no descendants. He was succeeded by his brother.
Regency of Hedwig Eleonora of Holstein-Gottorp (1697)							Also King of Sweden, as Charles XII. After his death with no descendants, Zweibrücken was inherited by Kleeburg line.
Charles II		17 June 1682; Tre Kronor; Son of Charles I and Ulrika Eleonora of Denmark	5 April 1697 – 30 November 1718	County of Zweibrücken	Unmarried	30 November 1718; Halden aged 36	Also King of Sweden, as Charles XII. After his death with no descendants, Zweibrücken was inherited by Kleeburg line.
Gustavus		12 April 1670; Stegeborg Castle; Second son of Adolph John I and Elsa Elisabeth Brahe	27 April 1701 – 30 November 1718	County of Kleeburg	Dorothea of Palatinate-Veldenz; 10 July 1707 no children Louise Dorothea von Hoffmann; 13 May 1723 (morganatic) no children	17 September 1731; Zweibrücken aged 61	Inherited Zweibrücken from his cousin Charles IV, and annexed Kleeburg to it. Left no descendants. His lands went to Birkenfeld line.
Gustavus		12 April 1670; Stegeborg Castle; Second son of Adolph John I and Elsa Elisabeth Brahe	30 November 1718 – 17 September 1731	County of Zweibrücken	Dorothea of Palatinate-Veldenz; 10 July 1707 no children Louise Dorothea von Hoffmann; 13 May 1723 (morganatic) no children	17 September 1731; Zweibrücken aged 61	Inherited Zweibrücken from his cousin Charles IV, and annexed Kleeburg to it. Left no descendants. His lands went to Birkenfeld line.
Palatinate-Kleeburg was definitely reannexed to Palatinate-Zweibrücken
Regency of John William, Elector Palatine (1704–1711)							Left no male descendants. He was succeeded by his brother John.
Frederick Bernard		28 May 1697; Gelnhausen; First son of John Charles and Esther Maria von Witzleben	21 February 1704 – 5 August 1739	County of Gelnhausen	Ernestine Louise of Waldeck-Pyrmont; 30 May 1737; Arolsen two children	5 August 1739; Gelnhausen aged 42	Left no male descendants. He was succeeded by his brother John.
Theodore Eustace		14 February 1659; Sulzbach; Son of Christian Augustus and Amalie of Nassau-Siegen	23 July 1708 – 11 July 1732	County of Sulzbach	Maria Eleonore of Hesse-Rotenburg; 6 June 1692; Lobositz nine children	11 July 1732; Dinkelsbühl aged 73	
Charles Philip		4 November 1661; Neuburg an der Donau; Second son of Philip William and Elisabeth Amalie of Hesse-Darmstadt	8 June 1716 – 31 December 1742	Electorate of the Palatinate (Neuburg line)	Ludwika Karolina Radziwiłł; 10 August 1688; Berlin four children Teresa Lubomirska; 15 December 1701; Kraków two children Violante Theresia of Thurn and Taxis; 1728 (morganatic) no children	31 December 1742; Mannheim aged	Left no male descendants. The Electorate was inherited by the Counts of Sulzbach line.
Christian III		7 November 1674; Strasbourg; Son of Christian II and Catherine Agatha of Rappoltstein	26 April 1717 – 17 September 1731	County of Birkenfeld	Caroline of Nassau-Saarbrücken; 21 September 1719; Lorentzen four children	3 February 1735; Zweibrücken aged 60	Inherited Zweibrücken from his cousin Gustavus, and annexed Birkenfeld to it.
Christian III		7 November 1674; Strasbourg; Son of Christian II and Catherine Agatha of Rappoltstein	17 September 1731 – 3 February 1735	County of Zweibrücken	Caroline of Nassau-Saarbrücken; 21 September 1719; Lorentzen four children	3 February 1735; Zweibrücken aged 60	Inherited Zweibrücken from his cousin Gustavus, and annexed Birkenfeld to it.
Birkenfeld reannexed to Zweibrücken
Charles Albert	Charles Albert	6 August 1697; Brussels Son of Maximilian II Emanuel and Maria Antonia of Austria	26 February 1726 – 20 January 1745	Electorate of Bavaria	Maria Amalia of Austria; 5 October 1722; Vienna seven children	20 January 1745; Munich aged 47	Took on the House of Habsburg in the War of the Austrian Succession, again in combination with France, succeeding so far as to be elected Holy Roman Emperor in 1742 (as Charles VII). However, the Austrians occupied Bavaria (1742–1744), and the Emperor died shortly after returning to Munich.
John Christian		23 January 1700; Sulzbach; Son of Theodore Eustace and Maria Eleonore of Hesse-Rotenburg	11 July 1732 – 20 July 1733	County of Sulzbach	Maria Henriette de La Tour d'Auvergne; 15 February 1722 two children Eleonore of Hesse-Rotenburg; 21 January 1731; Mannheim no children	20 July 1733; Sulzbach aged 33	
Regency of Caroline of Nassau-Saarbrücken (1735–1740)							His children from his morganatic marriage were barred from succession. He was succeeded by his nephew.
Christian IV		6 September 1722; Bischweiler; Son of Christian III and Caroline of Nassau-Saarbrücken	3 February 1735 – 5 November 1775	County of Zweibrücken	Maria Johanna Camasse; 1751 (morganatic) six children	5 November 1775; Herschweiler-Pettersheim aged 53	His children from his morganatic marriage were barred from succession. He was succeeded by his nephew.
John		24 May 1698; Gelnhausen; Second son of John Charles and Esther Maria von Witzleben	5 August 1739 – 10 February 1780	County of Gelnhausen	Sophie Charlotte of Salm-Dhaun; 1743; Dhaun eight children	10 February 1780; Mannheim aged 81	
Maximilian III Joseph the Beloved	Maximillian III	28 March 1727; Munich; Son of Charles Albert and Maria Amalia of Austria	20 January 1745 – 30 December 1777	Electorate of Bavaria	Maria Anna Sophia of Saxony; 9 July 1747 no children	30 December 1777; Munich aged 50	As he had no children, was the last of the direct Bavarian Wittelsbach line descended from Louis IV. He was succeeded by the Elector of the Palatinate, Charles Theodore, who thereby regained their old titles for the senior Wittelsbach line—descended from Louis IV's older brother Rudolph I.
Elisabeth Augusta		17 January 1721; Mannheim; Daughter of Joseph Charles of the Palatinate-Sulzbach and Elisabeth Augusta Sophia of the Palatinate-Neuburg	31 December 1742 – 17 August 1794	Electorate of the Palatinate (maternal Neuburg line, suo jure heiress)	Charles Theodore; 17 January 1742; Mannheim one child	17 August 1794; Weinheim aged 73	Elisabeth was the maternal granddaughter of Charles Philip, and the wife of the next Elector Palatine; she therefore carried the title (suo jure) to her husband. However, the title and authority of Elector Palatine were subsumed into the Electorate of Bavaria in 1777. Charles Theodore and his heirs retained only the single vote and precedence of the Bavarian elector, though they continued to use the title "Count Palatine of the Rhine" (German: Pfalzgraf bei Rhein, Latin: Comes Palatinus Rheni). They left no descendants, and the Electorates passed to the Zweibrücken line.
Regency of Charles Philip, Elector Palatine (1733–1738)
Charles Theodore		11 December 1724; Drogenbos; Son of John Christian and Maria Henriette de La Tour d'Auvergne	20 July 1733 – 31 December 1742	County of Sulzbach	Elisabeth Augusta; 17 January 1742; Mannheim one child Maria Leopoldine of Austria-Este; 15 February 1795; Innsbruck no children	16 February 1799; Munich aged 74	
Charles Theodore		11 December 1724; Drogenbos; Son of John Christian and Maria Henriette de La Tour d'Auvergne	31 December 1742 – 16 February 1799	Electorate of the Palatinate (Sulzbach line, with the Electorate of Bavaria since 1777)	Elisabeth Augusta; 17 January 1742; Mannheim one child Maria Leopoldine of Austria-Este; 15 February 1795; Innsbruck no children	16 February 1799; Munich aged 74	
Charles August		29 October 1746; Düsseldorf; First son of Frederick Michael of the Palatinate-Zweibrücken and Maria Franziska of the Palatinate-Sulzbach	5 November 1775 – 1 April 1795	County of Zweibrücken	Maria Amalia of Saxony; 12 February 1774; Dresden no children	1 April 1795; Mannheim aged 48	Nephew of Christian IV, left no descendants. He was succeeded by his brother.
Charles John Louis		13/18 September 1745; Gelnhausen; First son of John and Sophie Charlotte of Salm-Dhaun	10 February 1780 – 31 March 1789	County of Gelnhausen	Unmarried	31 March 1789; Mannheim aged 43	Left no male descendants. He was succeeded by his brother William.
William		10 November 1752; Gelnhausen; Second son of John and Sophie Charlotte of Salm-Dhaun	31 March 1789 – 16 February 1799	County of Gelnhausen	Maria Anna of Zweibrücken-Birkenfeld; 30 January 1780; Mannheim three children	8 January 1837; Bamberg aged 84	In 1799 his lands were annexed to Bavaria.
Gelnhausen definitely annexed to the Electorate of Bavaria
Maximilian IV & I Joseph		27 May 1756; Schwetzingen; Second son of Frederick Michael of the Palatinate-Zweibrücken and Maria Franziska of the Palatinate-Sulzbach	1 April 1795 – 16 February 1799	County of Zweibrücken	Augusta Wilhelmine of Hesse-Darmstadt; 30 September 1785; Darmstadt five children Caroline of Baden; 9 March 1797; Karlsruhe eight children	13 October 1825; Munich aged 69	Charles Theodore's heir, Maximilian Joseph, Duke of Zweibrücken (on the French border), brought all the Wittelsbach territories under a single rule in 1799. In the chaos of the Wars of the French Revolution, the old order of the Holy Roman Empire collapsed, and the Palatinate was dissolved: first, its left bank territories were occupied (and then annexed) by France starting in 1795; then, in 1803, its right bank territories were taken by the Margrave of Baden. The Rhenish Palatinate, as a distinct territory, disappeared. In the course of these events, Bavaria became once again the ally of France, and Maximilian IV Joseph became King Maximilian I of Bavaria—whilst remaining Prince-Elector and Arch-steward of the Holy Roman Empire until 6 August 1806, when the Holy Roman Empire was abolished.
Maximilian IV & I Joseph		27 May 1756; Schwetzingen; Second son of Frederick Michael of the Palatinate-Zweibrücken and Maria Franziska of the Palatinate-Sulzbach	16 February 1799 – 1 January 1806 1 January 1806 –13 October 1825	Electorate of Bavaria (until 1806; with the Palatinate in personal union until 27 April 1803) Kingdom of Bavaria (from 1806)	Augusta Wilhelmine of Hesse-Darmstadt; 30 September 1785; Darmstadt five children Caroline of Baden; 9 March 1797; Karlsruhe eight children	13 October 1825; Munich aged 69	
In 1799, Palatinate-Zweibrücken was definitely annexed to the Electorate of Bavaria
In 1803, the Electoral Palatinate was definitely annexed to the Electorate of Bavaria
Ludwig I		25 August 1786; Strasbourg; Son of Maximilian IV & I Joseph and Augusta Wilhelmine of Hesse-Darmstadt	13 October 1825 – 20 March 1848	Kingdom of Bavaria	Therese of Saxe-Hildburghausen; 12 October 1810; Munich nine children	29 February 1868; Nice aged 81	Abdicated in the Revolutions of 1848.
Maximilian II		28 November 1811; Munich; Son of Ludwig I and Therese of Saxe-Hildburghausen	20 March 1848 – 10 March 1864	Kingdom of Bavaria	Marie of Prussia; 12 October 1842; Munich two children	10 March 1864; Munich aged 52	
Ludwig II		25 August 1845; Munich; First son of Maximilian II and Marie of Prussia	10 March 1864 – 13 June 1886	Kingdom of Bavaria	Unmarried	13 June 1886; Lake Starnberg aged 40	Ludwig II was called the Märchenkönig (Fairy tale king). He grudgingly acceded to Bavaria becoming a component of the German Empire in 1871, was declared insane in 1886.
Regency of Prince Luitpold of Bavaria (1886–1912); Regency of Prince Ludwig of Bavaria (1912–1913)							From a mathematical, calendrical point of view, his marked the longest "reign" amongst the Kings of Bavaria. However, Otto was mentally ill since teenhood and throughout all of his later life, hence the royal functions had to be carried out by prince regents.
Otto		27 April 1848; Munich; Second son of Maximilian II and Marie of Prussia	13 June 1886 – 15 November 1913	Kingdom of Bavaria	Unmarried	15 November 1913; Munich aged 68	From a mathematical, calendrical point of view, his marked the longest "reign" amongst the Kings of Bavaria. However, Otto was mentally ill since teenhood and throughout all of his later life, hence the royal functions had to be carried out by prince regents.
Ludwig III		7 January 1845; Munich; Son of Prince Luitpold of Bavaria and Auguste Ferdinande of Austria	5 November 1913 – 13 November 1918	Kingdom of Bavaria	Maria Theresa of Austria-Este; 20 February 1868; Vienna thirteen children	13 November 1918; Sárvár aged 76	Previous regent. Declared King of Bavaria following a controversial change of the constitution, discharging his cousin Otto from "office". Lost the throne in the German Revolution of 1918–1919 at the end of World War I. Marks the end of 738 years of uninterrupted Wittelsbach rule over Bavaria.

== Major members of the family ==
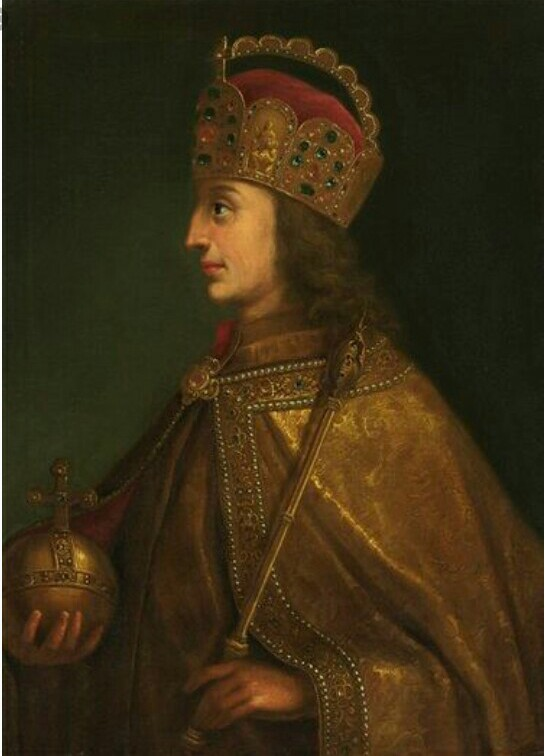
Louis IV, Holy Roman Emperor (1314–1347)

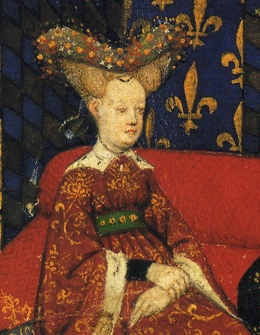
Isabeau of Bavaria, Queen of France (1370–1435)

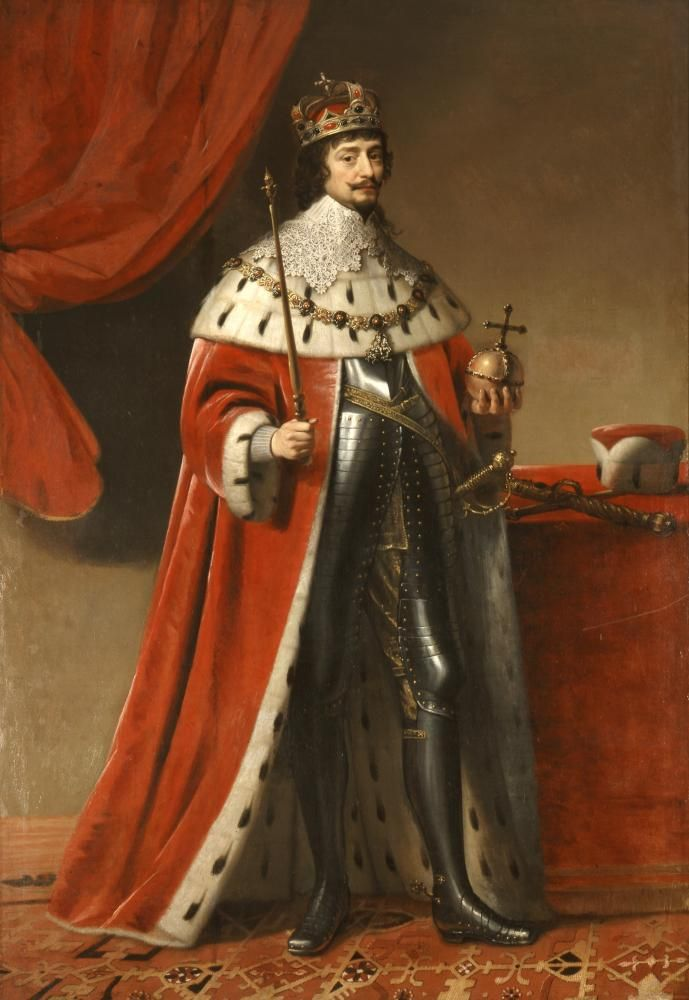
Frederick V, Elector Palatine, King of Bohemia (1596–1632)

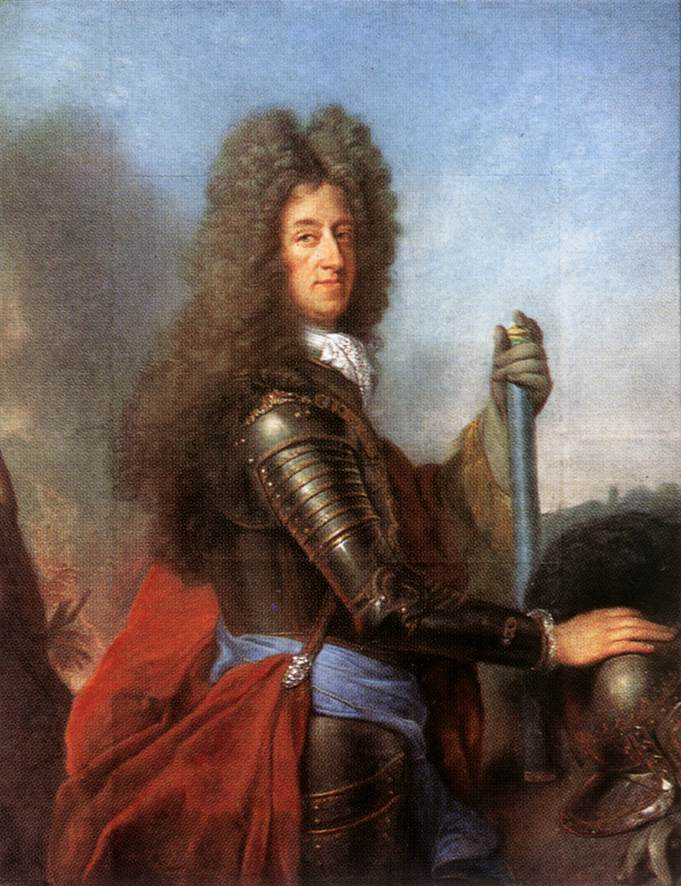
Maximilian II Emanuel, Elector of Bavaria (1662–1726)

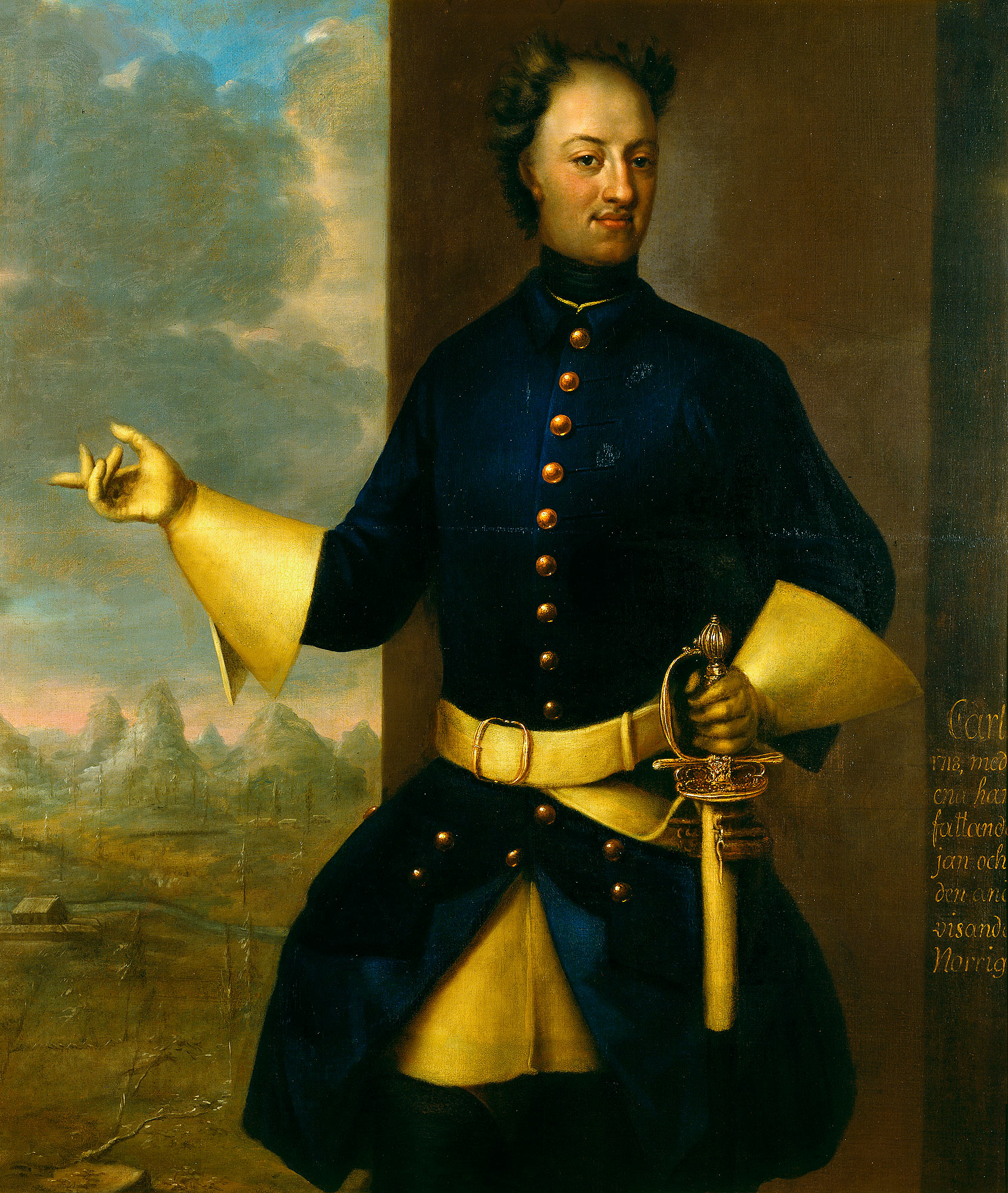
Charles XII, King of Sweden (1682–1718)

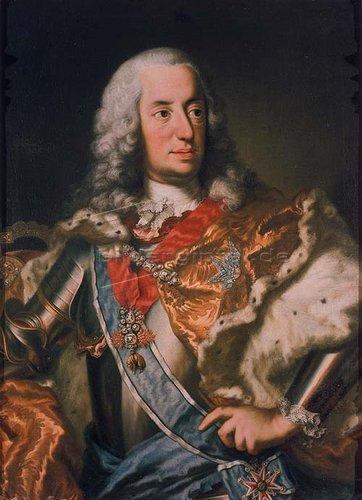
Charles VII, Holy Roman Emperor (1742–1745)

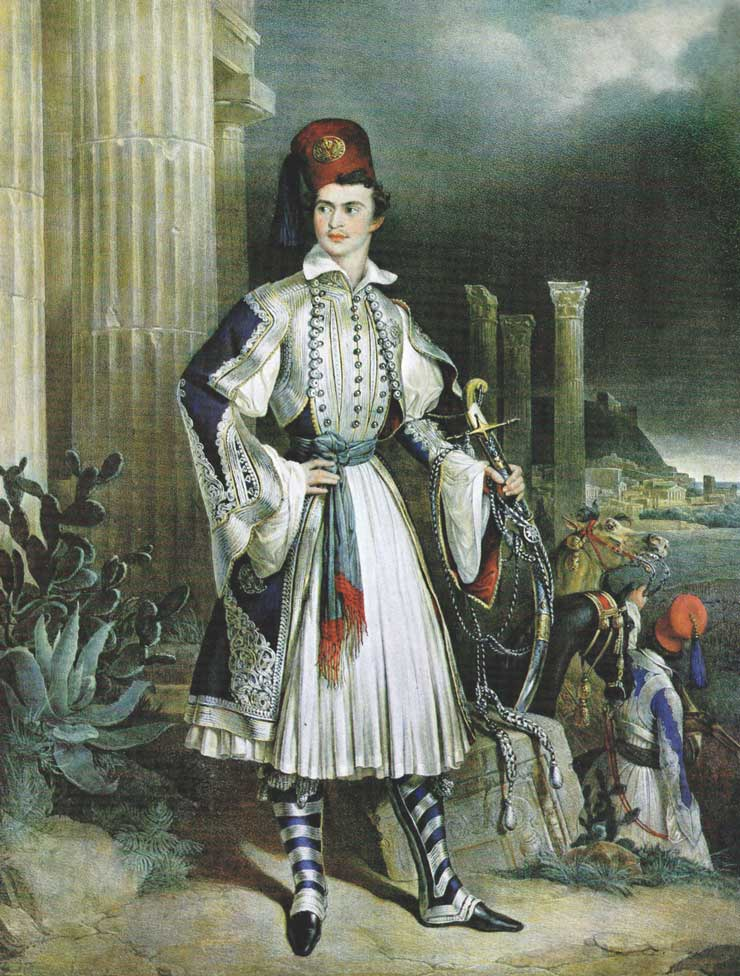
Otto, King of Greece (1815–1867)

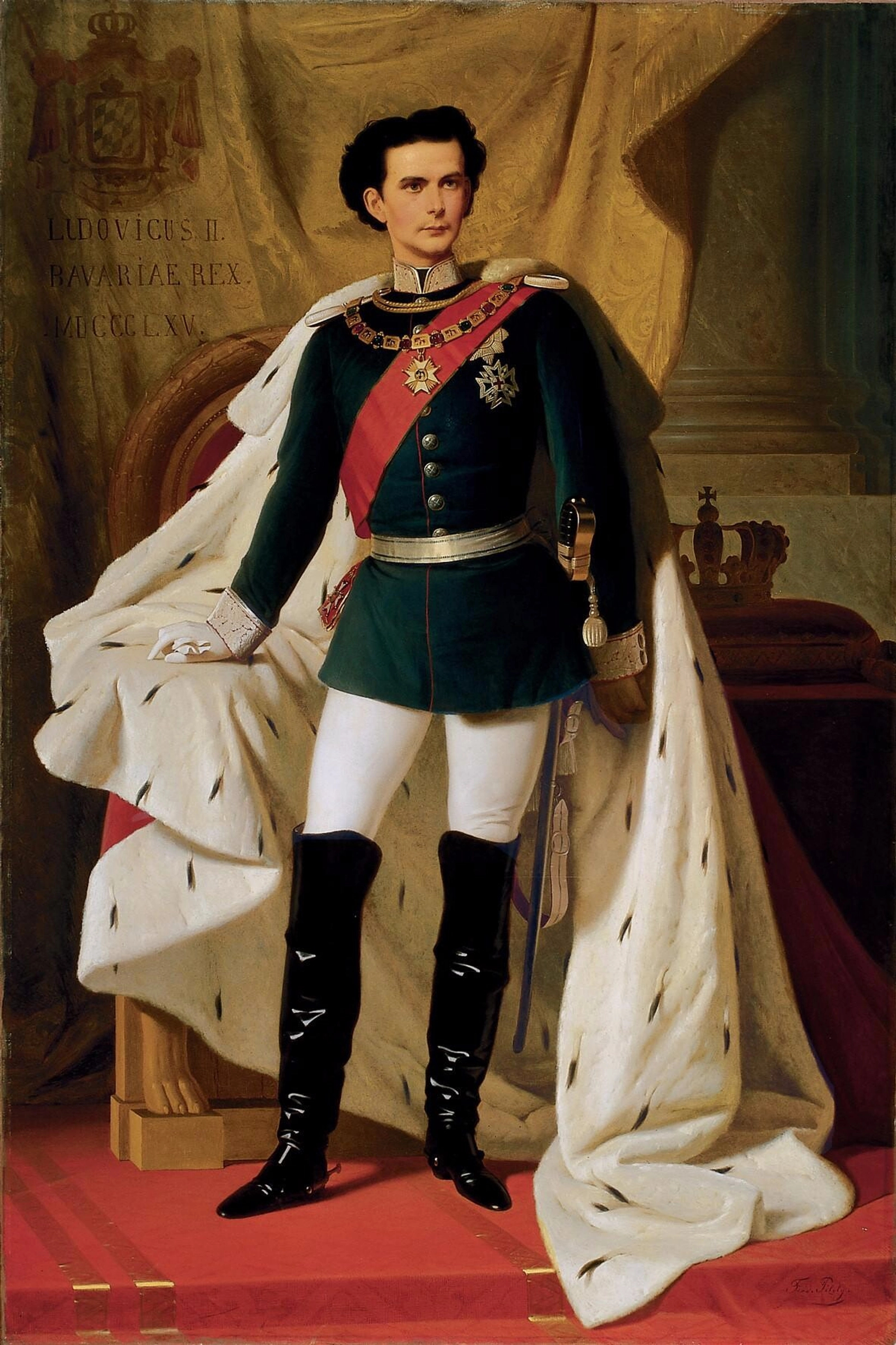
Ludwig II, King of Bavaria (1845–1886)

=== Patrilineal descent ===
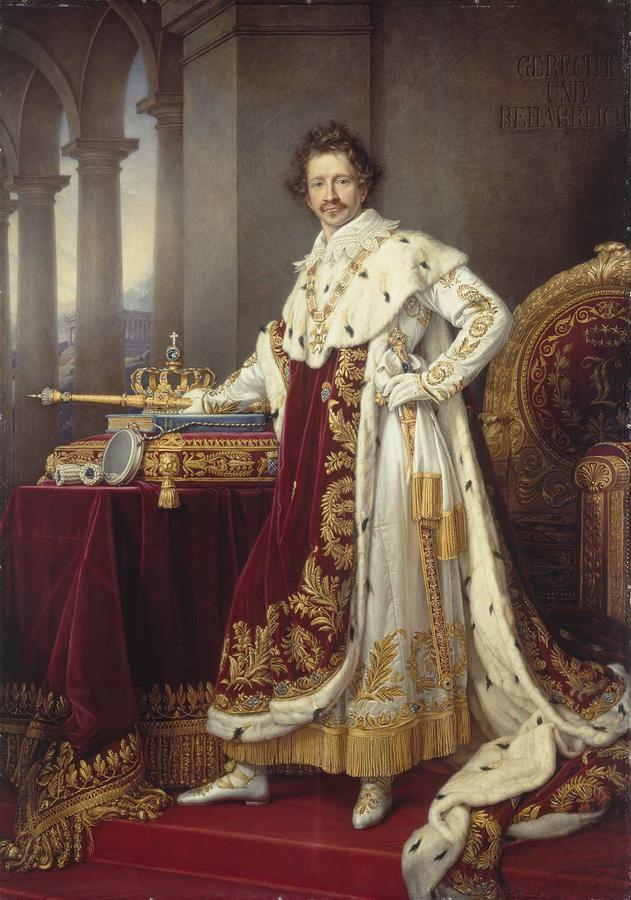
Portrait of Ludwig I of Bavaria by Joseph Karl Stieler, 1826

Duke Franz's patriline is the line from which he is descended father to son. Patrilineal descent is the principle behind membership in royal houses, as it can be traced back through the generations.

1. Heinrich I, Count of Pegnitz, 1000–1043
2. Otto I, Count of Scheyern, 1020–1072
3. Eckhard I, Count of Scheyern, 1044–1088
4. Otto IV, Count of Wittelsbach, 1083–1156
5. Otto I, Duke of Bavaria, 1117–1183
6. Louis I, Duke of Bavaria, 1173–1231
7. Otto II Wittelsbach, Duke of Bavaria, 1206–1253
8. Louis II, Duke of Bavaria, 1229–1294
9. Rudolf I, Duke of Bavaria, 1274–1319
10. Adolf, Count Palatine of the Rhine, 1300–1327
11. Rupert II, Elector Palatine, 1325–1398
12. Rupert of Germany, 1352–1410
13. Stephen, Count Palatine of Simmern-Zweibrücken, 1385–1459
14. Louis I, Count Palatine of Zweibrücken, 1424–1489
15. Alexander, Count Palatine of Zweibrücken, 1462–1514
16. Louis II, Count Palatine of Zweibrücken, 1502–1532
17. Wolfgang, Count Palatine of Zweibrücken, 1526–1569
18. Charles I, Count Palatine of Zweibrücken-Birkenfeld, 1560–1600
19. Christian I, Count Palatine of Birkenfeld-Bischweiler, 1598–1654
20. Christian II, Count Palatine of Zweibrücken, 1637–1717
21. Christian III, Count Palatine of Zweibrücken, 1674–1735
22. Count Palatine Frederick Michael of Zweibrücken, 1724–1767
23. Maximilian I Joseph of Bavaria, 1756–1825
24. Ludwig I of Bavaria, 1786–1868
25. Luitpold, Prince Regent of Bavaria, 1821–1912
26. Ludwig III of Bavaria, 1845–1921
27. Rupprecht, Crown Prince of Bavaria, 1869–1955
28. Albrecht, Duke of Bavaria, 1905–1996
29. Franz, Duke of Bavaria, b. 1933

=== Bavarian branch ===
- Louis V, Margrave of Brandenburg, Duke of Bavaria and Count of Tyrol (1323–1361)
- Albert I, Duke of Bavaria, Count of Holland and Hainaut (1347–1404)
- Isabeau de Bavière (1371–1435), queen-consort of France
- Ernest, Duke of Bavaria (1397–1438) duke of Bavaria-Munich
- Albert III, Duke of Bavaria (1438–1460) duke of Bavaria-Munich
- Jacqueline, Countess of Hainaut and Holland (1417–1432)
- Albert IV, Duke of Bavaria (1465–1508)
- William IV, Duke of Bavaria (1508–1550), co-regent Louis X from 1516 to 1545
- Louis X, Duke of Bavaria (1516–1545)
- Albert V, Duke of Bavaria (1550–1579)
- Maximilian I, Elector of Bavaria (1597–1651)
- Maria Anna, Dauphine of France (1660–1690)
- Maximilian II Emanuel, Elector of Bavaria (1662–1726)
- Duchess Violante Beatrice of Bavaria (1673–1731), Hereditary Princess of Tuscany and Governess of Siena,
- Clemens August of Bavaria (1700–1761)
- Maria Antonia of Bavaria (1724–1780)

=== Palatinate branch ===
- Frederick I, Elector Palatine (1451–1476)
- Frederick III, Elector Palatine (1559–1576)
- Frederick V, Elector Palatine (1610–1623), King of Bohemia (the "Winter King")
- Charles I Louis, Elector Palatine (1648–1680)
- Prince Rupert of the Rhine (1619–1682)
- Sophia of the Palatine (1630–1714), daughter of Frederick V, Heiress to the British throne, mother of King George I of Great Britain
- Elizabeth Charlotte, Princess Palatine (1652–1722)
- Johann Wilhelm, Elector Palatine (1690–1718), his wife Anna Maria Luisa de' Medici being the last scion of the House of Medici
- King Ludwig I of Bavaria (1825–1848)
- Princess Sophie of Bavaria (1805–1872), Archduchess of Austria
- Elisabeth in Bavaria (1837–1898) ("Sisi"), Empress of Austria
- Ludwig II of Bavaria (1864–1886)
- Marie Sophie (1841–1925), last queen of the Kingdom of the Two Sicilies
- Elisabeth of Bavaria (1876–1965), queen-consort of Albert I of Belgium
- Sophie, Hereditary Princess of Liechtenstein, b. 1967

=== Scandinavian kings ===
- Christopher of Denmark, Norway and Sweden, reigned 1440–1448

==== Royal House of Sweden ====
- Charles X Gustav of Sweden, reigned 1654–1660
- Charles XI of Sweden, reigned 1660–1697
- Charles XII of Sweden, reigned 1697–1718
- Ulrika Eleonora of Sweden, reigned 1718–1720

== Family tree ==
=== Antecedents of the Wittelsbachs and Early Dukes of Bavaria ===
House of Wittelsbach

**Luitpold**; **Founder of the** **Luitpoldings**; **Margrave of Carinthia** **and** **Upper Pannonia,** **Count in the Nordgau** ?–907
**Arnulf the Bad**; **Duke of Bavaria** **r. 907–937** ?–937
**Count Henry von Schweinfurt**; **Margrave of the Nordgau** **r. 994–1017** c.970–1017 or, **Count Berthold of Schweinfurt** ?–980	**Leopold I** **Margrave of Ostmark** **r. 976–994** c. 940 – 994
**Heinrich I** **Count of Pegnitz** **c. 1008 – c. 1043**	**House of Babenberg(de)**; Margraves & Dukes of Austria to 1246
**Otto I** **Count of Scheyern**; **Vogt of Freising** c.1020–1072
**Eckhard I** **Count of Scheyern** **c. 1044–1091**	**Bernard I** **Count of Scheyern** d.abt. 1102	**Otto II**; **Count of Scheyern**; Vogt of Freising and Weihenstephan ?-1120	**Arnold I** **Count of Scheyern in Dachau** d. c. 1123
**Udalrich I** **(also Ulrich)**; Count of Scheyern and Vogt of Freising † 1130	**Otto IV**; **Count of Scheyern**; **Count of Wittelsbach**, 1116; **Count Palatine of Bavaria** **r. 1120–1156** c. 1083–1156	**Ekkehard II**; 1116, Vogt von Ebersberg † after 1135	**Otto III** d.1130	**Eckhard III** d.1183	Bernard II (d. c. 1135)	**Conrad I** **Count of Scheyern-Dachau** † 1130	**Arnold II**; **Count of Scheyern-Dachau** † 1124	**Otto I** **Count of Scheyern in Dachau-Valley** † 1130
**House of Wittelsbach**
**Otto I the Redhead**; **Count Palatine of Bavaria,** **Count of Wittelsbach & Scheyern (Otto VI)** **r. 1156–1180**; **Duke of Bavaria** **r. 1180–1183**; 1117–1183)	**Conrad of Wittelsbach, Cardinal**; **Archbishop of Mainz** **, r. 1161–1165, 1183−1200** c. 1120/1125–1200	**Otto VII**; **Count Palatine of Bavaria** d.1189	**Conrad I** **Duke of Merania** **r.1152–1159** d.1159	**Conrad I** **Count of Scheyern in Dachau-Valley** † 1175
**Louis I the Kelheimer**; **Duke of Bavaria** **r. 1183–1231**; 1173–1231	**Otto VIII**; **Count Palatine of Bavaria, r. 1189–1209** bef. 1180–1209 killed Philip of Swabia	**Conrad II**; **Duke of Merania** **r.1159-–1182** d.1182	**Otto II**; **Count of Scheyern in Dachau-Valley** † 1166	**Conrad II**; **Count of Scheyern in Dachau-Valley** † 1200
**House of Wittelsbach**	**Otto III**; **Count of Scheyern in Dachau-Valley** † 1268
**Otto II**; **Duke of Bavaria** **r. 1231–1253** (1206–1253) m.Agnes of the Palatinate, grdd of Duke Henry the Lion and Conrad of Hohenstaufen by which the Wittelsbach inherited the Palatinate
**Louis II**; **Duke of Bavaria & Count Palatine of the Rhine** **r. 1253–1294** (1229–1294)	**Henry XIII**; **Duke of (Lower) Bavaria** **r. 1255–1290** (1235–1290) m. Elizabeth d. Béla IV of Hungary
**Rudolf I the Stammerer**; Elector Palatine (1274–1319)	**Louis IV**; Holy Roman Emperor,1314; Duke of Upper Bavaria, 1294 (1282–1347)	**Otto III**; **Duke of (Lower) Bavaria** **r. 1290–1312**; King of Hungary **r.1305–1307** (1261–1312)	**Louis III**; **Duke of (Lower) Bavaria** **r. 1290–1296** (1269–1296)	**Stephen I** **Duke of (Lower) Bavaria** **r. 1290–1310** (1271–1310)
**House of Wittelsbach in the Palatine and Bavaria**	**Henry XV**; **Duke of (Lower) Bavaria** **r. 1312–1333** (1312–1333)	**Henry XIV**; **Duke of (Lower) Bavaria** **r. 1310–1339** (1305–1339)	**Otto IV**; **Duke of (Lower) Bavaria** **r. 1310–1334** (1307–1334)
**John I** **Duke of (Lower) Bavaria** **r. 1339–1340** (1329–1340) lower Bavaria passed to Emperor Louis IV

=== The Palatinate/Elder Branch ===
House of Wittelsbach in the Palatine

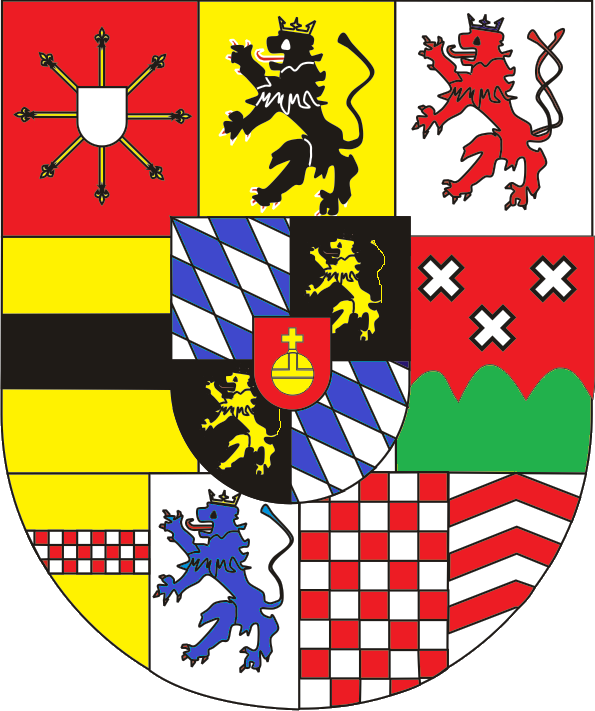
**House of Wittelsbach**
**Rudolf I the Stammerer**; Elector Palatine (1274–1319)	**Louis IV**; Holy Roman Emperor,1314; Duke of Upper Bavaria, 1294 (1282–1347)
**Adolf, Count Palatine of the Rhine**(1300–1327)	**Rudolf II, Count Palatine of the Rhine**; Elector Palatine (1306–1353)	**Rupert I, Elector Palatine**; Elector Palatine, 1353–1356 (1309– 1390)
**Rupert II, Elector Palatine**; Elector Palatine (1325–1398)
**Rupert**; King of Germany (1352–1410) m. Elisabeth of Nuremberg
**Rupert** (1375–1397)	**Frederick** (1377–1401)	**Louis III**; Elector Palatine (1378–1436)	**John**; Count Palatine of Neumarkt (1383–1443) m. Catherine of Pomerania	**Stephen**; Count Palatine of Simmern-Zweibrucken (1385–1459) m. Anna of Veldenz	**Otto**; Count Palatine of Mosbach (1390–1461)
**Louis IV, Elector Palatine**; Elector Palatine (1424–1449)	**Frederick I, Elector Palatine**; Elector Palatine (1425–1476)	**Ruprect**; Elector and Archbishop of Cologne (1427 –1480)	**Christopher**; King of Sweden, Denmark and Norway (1416–1448)	**Frederick** the Hunsrücker; Count Palatine of Simmern (1417–1480)	**Rupert**; Bishop of Strasbourg (1420–1478)	**Stephen** (1421–1485)	**Louis** the Black (1424–1489) m. Johanna de Cröy	**John**; Archbishop of Magdeburg (1429–1475)	**Counts of Mosbach-Neumarkt**
**Philip, Elector Palatine**; Elector Palatine (1448–1508)	**John I, Count Palatine of Simmern** (1459–1509)	**Kaspar**; Count Palatine of Zweibrücken (1458–1527)	**Alexander** the Lame (1462–1514) m. Margaret of Hohenlohe-Neuenstein
**Louis V** Elector Palatine (1478–1544); Lutheran, 1530s	**Ruprecht of the Palatinate**; Bishop of Freising (1481–1504)	**Frederick II the Wise**; Elector Palatine (1482–1556); Lutheran, 1540s	John II, Count Palatine of Simmern (1492–1557)	**Louis** the Younger (1502–1532) m. Elisabeth of Hesse	**Rupert**; Count Palatine of Veldenz (1506–1544)
**Otto Henry, Elector Palatine**; Elector Palatine (1502–1559); Lutheran, 1540s	**Philip, Duke of Palatinate-Neuburg** (1503–1548)	**Frederick III** **the Pious**; Count Palatine of Simmern; Elector Palatine,1559 (1515–1576) made the Palatine Calvinist	**Wolfgang**; Count Palatine of Zweibrücken (1526–1569) n. Anna of Hesse	**Counts of Veldenz**
**Louis VI, Elector Palatine** (1539–1583); Lutheran	**John Casimir**; Count Palatine of Lautern (1543– 1592); Calvinist general	**Philip Louis**; Count Palatine of Neuburg (1547–1614); Lutheran m.Anna of Jülich-Cleves-Berg	**John** the Lame (1550–1604) m. Magdalene of Jülich-Cleves-Berg	**Otto Henry**; Count Palatine of Sulzbach (1556–1604)	**Frederick**; Count Palatine of Zweibrücken-Vohenstrauss-Parkstein (1557–1597)	**Charles**; Count Palatine of Zweibrücken-Birkenfeld (1560–1600)
**Frederick IV, Elector Palatine** (1574 –1610); Calvinist	**Wolfgang Wilhelm, Count Palatine of Neuburg** (1578–1653); Duke of Jülich & Berg, 1614; Lutheran to 1613, Catholic	**Augustus, Count Palatine of Sulzbach** (1582–1632); Catholic	**John** the Younger; Count Palatine of Zweibrucken (1584–1635)	**Frederick Casimir**; Count Palatine of Zweibrücken-Landsberg (1585–1645)	**John Casimir**; Count Palatine of Kleeburg (1589–1652) m. Catherine of Sweden	**George William, Count Palatine of Zweibrücken-Birkenfeld** (1591–1669)	**Christian I, Count Palatine of Birkenfeld-Bischweiler** (1598–1654)
Princess Elizabeth of England, Scotland and Ireland (1596–1662)	**Frederick V, Elector Palatine** (1596–1632), r. 1610–1623; **King of Bohemia**,1619-1620; Calvinist	**Philip William** (1615–1690); C. Pal. of Neuburg: r. 1653–1690, D. Julich & Berg: r. 1653–1679, Elector Palatine: r. 1685–1690; Catholic	**Christian Augustus, Count Palatine of Sulzbach** (1622–1708); Catholic	**Frederick**; **Count Palatine of Zweibrucken & Duke of Zweibrucken** (1616–1661)	**Frederick Louis**; Count Palatine of Zweibrücken (1619–1681)	**Charles X Gustav**; King of Sweden (1622–1660) m. Hedwig Eleonora of Holstein-Gottorp	**Adolf John**; Count Palatine of Kleeburg (1629–1689)	**Charles II Otto, Count Palatine of Zweibrücken-Birkenfeld** (1625–1671)	**Christian II, Count Palatine of Zweibrücken-Birkenfeld** (1637–1717)	**John Charles, Count Palatine of Gelnhausen** (1638–1704)
**Charles I Louis, Elector Palatine** (1617–1680) r. 1648–1680; Calvinist	**Prince Rupert of the Rhine** (1619-1682); English General and Admiral; Lord High Admiral of England; Duke of Cumberland	**Sophia** (1630–1714); Her son became King George I of Great Britain in 1714.	**Johann Wilhelm, Elector Palatine, D of Julich & Berg** (1658–1716); Catholic	**Charles III Philip, Elector Palatine, D of Julich & Berg** (1661–1742); Catholic	**Theodore Eustace, Count Palatine of Sulzbach** (1659–1732)	**Fredrick Louis**; **Count Palatine of Zweibrucken&** **Duke of Zweibrucken** (1619–1681)	**Charles XI**; King of Sweden (1655–1697) m. Ulrika Eleonora of Denmark	**Counts of Kleeburg, ext 1731**; **Duke of Zweibrucken, 1718**	**Christian III, Count Palatine of Zweibrücken**; D. of Zweibrucken (1674–1735)	**Frederick Bernard, Count Palatine of Gelnhausen** (1697–1739)	**John, Count Palatine of Gelnhausen** (1698–1780)
**Charles II, Elector Palatine** (1651–1685) r. 1680–1685; Calvinist	House of Hanover Kings of Great Britain	**John Christian, Count Palatine of Sulzbach** (1700–1733)	**Charles XII**; King of Sweden (1682–1718)	**Ulrika Eleonora**; Queen of Sweden (1688–1741) m. Frederick I of Sweden	**Christian IV, Count Palatine of Zweibrücken**; D. Zweibrücken (1722–1775)	**Frederick Michael, Count Palatine of Zweibrücken**; D. Zweibrücken; Imp. Field Marshal (1724–1767)
**Charles Theodore** (1724–1799); Elector Palatine r. 1742–1777; Palatine Electorate merged with Bavarian; Elector of Bavaria r. 1777–1799; Catholic	**Charles II August, Duke of Zweibrücken** (1746–1795)	**Maximilian I Joseph**; D. Zweibrücken, 1795; El. Palatine, 1799–1806; El. Bavaria, 1799–1806; King of Bavaria, 1806 (1756–1825)	**William**; Duke in Bavaria (1752–1837)
Kings of Bavaria	Dukes in Bavaria

=== The Bavarian/Younger Branch ===
House of Wittelsbach in Bavaria

The colours denote the Dukes, Counts and Electors over the following regions of Bavaria and under the following circumstances:

– Holy Roman Emperor

Name of Duke – Dukes of Bavaria (united)

Name of Elector – Elector and Duke of Bavaria, ArchSenechal of the Empire (1623–1777)

Name of Elector – Elector Palatine of the Rhine

Name of Count – Count of Holland, Zealand, and Hainaut, Duke of Bavaria in Bavaria-Straubing (Lower Bavaria)

Name of Count – Count of Holland, Zealand, and Hainaut, Duke of Bavaria-Straubing (Lower Bavaria) -- disputed

Name of Margrave – Margrave of Brandenburg (Elector by Emperor Charles IV with Golden Bull of 1356)

Name of Archbishop/Cardinal and Elector – Prince-Elector and Archbishop of Cologne/Cardinal

Name of Duke – Dukes of Bavaria in Upper Bavaria (Oberbayern)

Name of Duke – Dukes of Bavaria in Lower Bavaria (Niederbayern)

Name of Duke – Dukes of Bavaria in Bavaria-Landshut (Lower Bavaria)

Name of Duke – Dukes of Bavaria in Bavaria-Ingolstadt (Upper Bavaria)

Name of Duke – Dukes of Bavaria in Bavaria-Munich (Upper Bavaria)

Name of Duke – Dukes of Bavaria-Munich-Dachau (Upper Bavaria)

Name of Duke – Duke in Bavaria, used since 1506, when primogeniture was established in Bavaria, by all other members of the house of Wittelsbach

**House of Wittelsbach**
**Rudolf I the Stammerer**; Elector Palatine (1274–1319)	**Louis IV**; Holy Roman Emperor,1314; Duke of Upper Bavaria, 1294 (1282–1347)
**Louis V the Brandenburger**; Margrave of Brandenburg r. 1323–1351; **Duke of (Upper) Bavaria** **r. 1347–1361** (1319–1375)	**Stephen II**; **Duke of Bavaria-Landshut** r. 1349–1363**Duke of (Upper)Bavaria** **r. 1363–1375** (1319–1375)	**Louis VI the Roman**; **Duke of (Upper) Bavaria** **r. 1347–1365**; **El. Margrave of Brandenburg** **r. 1356–1365** **raised to El. 1356** (1328–1365)	**William I** **Duke of (Lower) Bavaria** **r. 1349–1353**; **Duke of Bavaria(-Straubing)** **r. 1353–1398**; **Count of Holland, Zealand, and Hainaut** **r. 1345–1389** (1330–1389)	**Albrecht I** **Duke of (Lower) Bavaria** **r. 1349–1353**; **Duke of Bavaria(-Straubing)** **r. 1353–1404**; **Count of Holland, Zealand, and Hainaut** **r. 1389–1404** (1336–1404)	**Otto V the Bavarian**; **Duke of (Upper) Bavaria** **r. 1349–1351**; **El. Margrave of Brandenburg** **r. 1351–1373** **raised to El. 1356, dep. 1373 by Emp. Charles IV for his son Wenceslaus** (1340–1379)
**Meinhard III**; **Count of Tyrol** r. 1361–1363**Duke of (Upper)Bavaria** **r. 1361–1363** (1344–1363)	**Stephen III of Ingolstadt**; **Duke of Bavaria-Ingolstadt** **r. 1375–1413** **(1337–1413)**	**Frederick of Landshut**; **Duke of Bavaria-Landshut** **r. 1375–1393** **(1339–1393)**	**John II of Munich**; **Duke of Bavaria-Munich** **r. 1375–1397** **(1341–1397)**	**William II**; **Duke of Bavaria(-Straubing)** **r. 1404–1417**; **Count of Holland, Zealand, and Hainaut** **r. 1404–1417** **(1365–1417)**	**Albrecht II**; **Duke of Bavaria(-Straubing), admin for Will. II** **r. 1389–1397** **(1368–1397)**	**John III the Pitiless**; **Prince Bp. of Liege, resigned** **r. 1374–1425**; **Count of Holland, Zealand, de facto** **r. 1420–1425**; **Duke of Bavaria(-Straubing)r. 1417–1425**; **Duke of Luxembourg w/ wife Eliz.of Gorlitzr. 1418–1425** **(1374–1425)**
**Louis VII**; **Duke of Bavaria-Ingolstadt** **r. 1413–1443** **(1368–1447)**	**Henry XVI**; **Duke of Bavaria-Landshut** **r. 1393–1450**; **Ingolstadt (merged), r. 1447–1450** **(1386–1450)**	**Ernest**; **Duke of Bavaria-Munich** **r. 1397–1438** **absorbed Straubing, 1429** **(1373–1438)**	**William III** **co-Duke of Bavaria-Munich** **r. 1397–1435** **(1375–1435)**	**Jacqueline**; **Count of Holland, Zealand, and Hainaut**; **Holl & Zea. r. 1417–1420, r. 1425–1432, Hain r. 1417–1432** **(1401–1436)**
**Louis VIII**; **Duke of Bavaria-Ingolstadt** **r. 1443–1445** **(1403–1445)**	**Louis IX**; **Duke of Bavaria-Landshut & Ingolstadt** **r. 1450–1479** **(1417–1479)**	**Albrecht III the Pious**; **Duke of Bavaria-Munich & Straubing** **r. 1438–1460** **(1401–1460)**
**John IV of Munich**; **Duke of Bavaria-Munich & Straubing** **r. 1460–1463** **(1437–1463 of plague)**	**Sigismund of Dachau** **co-Duke of Bavaria-Munich & Straubing** **r. 1460–1467**; **Duke of Bavaria-Munich-Dachau, r. 1467–1501** **(1439–1501)**	**Albrect IV, the Wise**; **Duke of Bavaria-Munich & Straubing** **r. 1467–1508,** **Landshut, r. 1503–1508, & Ingolstadt** **(1447–1508)**; **Male-Primogeniture est. 1506**	**Christopher** **(1449–1493, Rhodes)**	**Wolfgang** **(1451–1514), a canon in Passau, Augsburg and Köln**
**William IV**; **Duke of Bavaria-Munich & Straubing, & Ingolstadt** **r. 1508–1550** **(1493 –1550)**	**Louis X of Landshut**; **Duke of Bavaria-Landshut** **r. 1516–1545** **(1495–1545)**	Ernest; Administrator of Diocese of Passau, r. 1516–1540; Administrator of Diocese of Salzburg, r. 1540–1554 (1500–1560)
**Albrecht V** **Duke of Bavaria** **r. 1550–1579** **(1528–1579)**	**United Bavaria**
**William V** **Duke of Bavaria** **r. 1579–1597** **(1548–1626)**	**Ferdinand**; **Duke in Bavaria, general** **(1550–1608)**	**Ernest**; **Duke in Bavaria**; **Elector and Abp. of Cologne, r. 1583–1612, & Pr. Bishop of Liege, (1581) & Hildesheim (1573), Freising, r. 1566–1612** **(1554–1612)**
**Maximilian I the Great**; **Duke of Bavaria** **r. 1597–1651**; **Elector & Arch-Seneschal (repl. Palatine, conf. 1648)** **r. 1623–1648**; **Elector of Bavaria & Arch-Seneschal** **r. 1648–1651** **(1573–1651)**	**Philip**; **Duke in Bavaria**; **Bp. of Regensburg** **r. 1579–1598**; **Cardinal, 1596** **(1576–1598)**	**Ferdinand**; **Duke in Bavaria**; **Elector and Abp. of Cologne & etc., r. 1612–1650** **(1577–1650)**	**Albrecht VI**; **Duke in Bavaria**; **Landgrave of Leuchtenberg to 1650, Reichsgraf of Haag in Oberbayern**; **Regent of Bavaria, r. 1651–1654** **(1584–1666)**
**Ferdinand**; **Elector and Duke of Bavaria** **r. 1651–1679** **(1636–1679)**	**Maximilian**; **Duke in Bavaria**; **Landgrave of Leuchtenberg**; **Prince Administrator (Kuradministrator) of Bavaria** **r. 1679–1680** **(1638–1705)**	**Maximilian Henry**; **Duke in Bavaria**; **Elector and Abp. of Cologne & etc., r. 1650–1688** **(1621- 1688)**	**Sigmund Albrecht** **Duke in Bavaria**; **Bishop of Freising and Regensburg, 1668** **(1623–1685)**
**Maria Antonia of Austria** **eldest d. & only surviving child of Emp.Leopold I & Margaret Theresa of Spain. heir to the Spanish throne** **(1669–1692)**	**Maximilian II Emanuel**; **Elector and Duke of Bavaria** **r. 1679–1726**; **Governor of Spanish Netherlands** **r. 1692–1706** **(1662–1726)**	**Joseph Clemens,** **Duke in Bavaria**; **Elector and Abp. of Cologne & etc., r. 1688–1723** **(1671- 1723)**
**Joseph Ferdinand**; **Duke in Bavaria** **heir of Spain** **(1692–1699)**	**Charles VII**; **Elector and Duke of Bavaria** **r. 1726–1745**; **King of Bohemia** **r. 1741–1743**; **Holy Roman Emperor** **r. 1742–1745** **(1697–1745)**	**Philipp Moritz Maria**; **Duke in Bavaria** **elected bishop of Paderborn and Münster** **(1698–1719)**	**Ferdinand Maria Innocenz**; **Duke in Bavaria**; **Imperial General** **(1699–1738)**	**Clemens Augustus**; **Duke in Bavaria**; **Elector and Abp. of Cologne & etc., r. 1723–1761** **(1700–1761)**	**Johann Theodore**; **Duke in Bavaria**; **Prince-Bishop of Regensburg, Prince-Bishop of Freising, and the Prince-Bishop of Liège**; **Cardinal** **(1703–1763)**
**Maximilian III Joseph**; **Elector and Duke of Bavaria** **r. 1745–1777** **(1727–1777)** **by the Treaty of Pavia (1329), Bavaria was inherited by the elder branch of the Palatine**	**Clemens Franics**; **Duke in Bavaria**; **Crown Prince of Bavaria** **(1722–1770)**

=== The Royal House of the Kingdom of Bavaria ===
Royal House of Bavaria/Wittelsbach

The colors denote the Kings, Prince, Dukes in Bavaria during the kingdom of Bavaria.
All the male and female descendants were "Princes of Bavaria" and "Princesses of Bavaria" even the younger line of the "Dukes in Bavaria".

Name of King - King of Bavaria Name of Duke - Duke in Bavaria

Name of Prince – Head of Royal House

2. Caroline; of Baden; 1776–1841	**Maximilian I/IV Joseph**; D. Zweibrücken, 1795; El. Palatine & Bavaria, 1799–1806; King of Bavaria,r. 1806–1825 (1756–1825)	1. Princess Augusta Wilhelmine of Hesse-Darmstadt; 1765–1796	William; Duke in Bavaria (1752–1837)	Countess Palatine Maria Anna of Zweibrücken-Birkenfeld sister of King Max I of Bavaria
Fr Wm IV of Prussia; 1795–1861	Elisabeth; Ludovika of Bavaria; 1801–1873	**Ludwig I** **King of Bavaria r. 1825–1848** **(1786––1868 )**	Theresa of Saxe- Hildburghausen; 1792–1854	**Karl Theodor**; **Fld Mar. & Insp. Gen.** **(1795–1875)**	**Pius**; **D. in Bavaria** **(1786–1837)**
**Maximilian II/V**; **King of Bavaria r. 1848–1864** **(1811––1864)**	Marie of Prussia; 1825–1889	**Otto**; **King of Greece** **r. 1832–1862** **(1815–1867)**	**Luitpold**; **Prinz Regent** **r. 1886–1912** **(1821–1912)**	Augusta; Ferdinande of Austria; 1825–1864	**Adalbert**; **P. of Bavaria** **(1828–1875)m. Inf. Amalia, s. K.-Cnsrt Francis of Spain**	**Maximilian Joseph**; **Duke in Bavaria** **(1808–1888)**
**Ludwig II**; **King of Bavaria r. 1864–1886** **"the Swan King" or "der Märchenkönig"** **(1845–1886)**	**Otto I (VIII)**; **King of Bavaria r. 1886–1913 deposed** **(1848–1916)**	**Ludwig III**; **Prince Regent, r. 1912–1913**; **King of Bavariar. 1913–1918 abd.** **in pretence** **1918–1921** **(1845–1921)**	Maria; Theresa of Austria-Este; 1849–1919	**Leopold, Fld. Mar.** **(1846–1930)**	**Arnulf** **(1852–1907)**	**Louis Ferdinand** **(1859–1949)m. Infanta María de la Paz of Spain**	**Alphonso** **(1862–1933)**	**Louis William, Gen. Cavalry**; **Duke in Bavaria** **(1831–1920)**	**Charles Theodore, Ophthalmologist**; **Duke in Bavaria** **(1839–1909)**	**Maximilian, 2nd Lt.** **Duke in Bavaria** **(1849–1893)**
**Rupert** **(1869–1955)** **in pretence** **1921–1955**	**Marie**; **Gabrielle** **of Bavaria, d. Charles Theordore** **(1876–1912)**	**Charles** **(1874–1927)**	**Francis, Gen.** **(1875–1957)**	**George, Col.** **Priest, 1921, Mnsgr.** **(1880–1943)**	**Conrad, Maj.** **(1883–1969)**	**Henry, Maj.** **(1884–1916),k. in action WWI**	**Ferdinand** **(1884–1958)** **m. Inf. Maria Teresa of Spain**	**Adalbert** **(1886–1970)**	**Joseph Clemens** **(1902–1990)**	**Luis William, Lt.** **(1884–1968)**	**Siegfried** **(1876–1952)**	**Christoph, Maj.** **(1879–1963)**	**Luitpold** **(1890–1973)**
**Luitpold**; **Hereditary Prince of Bavaria** **(1901–1914)**	**Albert VI** "Duke of Bavaria"; 1905–1996 in pretence 1955–1996	Maria; Draskovich of Trakostjan; 1904–1969	**Henry** **(1922–1958)**	**Louis** **(1913–2008)**	**Rasso** **(1926–2011)**	**Eugen** **(1925–1997)**	Princes of Spain
**Franz** "Duke of Bavaria"; 1933– in pretence (1996–)	**Maximilian Emmanuel**; **Duke in Bavaria** **(1937-)**	**Luitpold** **(1951-)**	**Father Florian** **born Francis Joseph** **(1957–2022)**	**Wolfgang** **(1960-)**	**Christopher** **(1962-)**

=== Complete genealogy of the Wittelsbach Dynasty ===
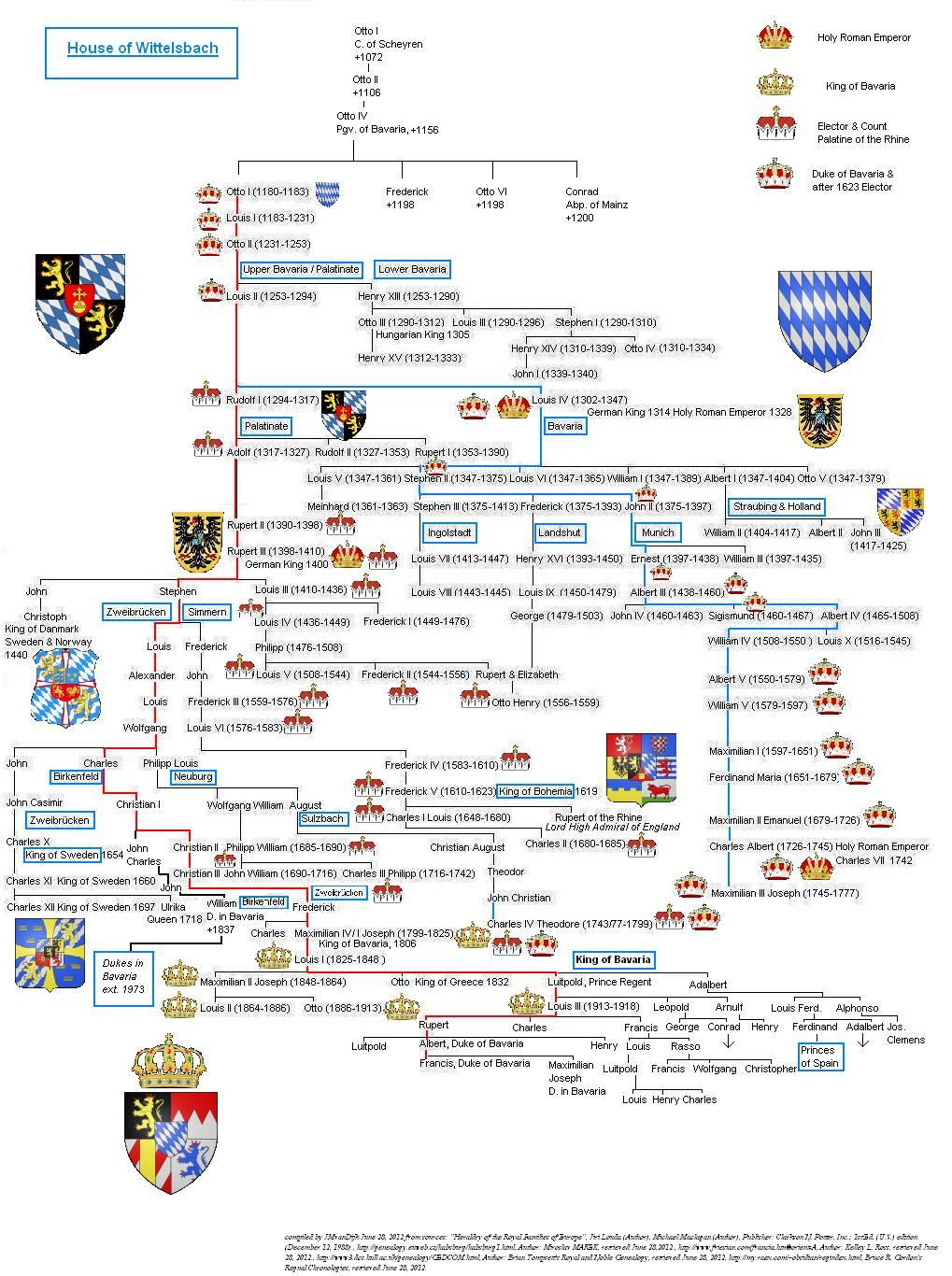

=== Living legitimate members of the House of Wittlesbach ===
Bold signifies heads of the house and numbers shown indicate the pretense to the kingship of Bavaria:

- **Ludwig I of Bavaria** (1786–1868)
  - **Maximilian II of Bavaria** (1811–1864)
    - **Ludwig II of Bavaria** (1845–1886)
    - **Otto of Bavaria** (1848–1916)
  - Princess Mathilde Caroline of Bavaria (1813–1863), married Louis III, Grand Duke of Hesse (1806–1877) without issue
  - Prince Otto of Bavaria, later **King of Greece**, (1815–1867), married Princess Amalia of Oldenburg (1818–1875) without issue
  - Princess Theodelinde of Bavaria (1816–1817)
  - Luitpold, Prince Regent of Bavaria (1821–1912)
    - **Ludwig III of Bavaria** 1845–1921
      - **Rupprecht, Crown Prince of Bavaria** (1869–1955)
        - Prince Luitpold of Bavaria (1901–1914)
        - Princess Irmingard of Bavaria (1902–1903)
        - **Albrecht, Duke of Bavaria** (1905–1996)
          - Princess Marie Gabrielle of Bavaria (born 1931), married Georg, Prince of Waldburg zu Zeil und Trauchburg (1928–2015) and has issue
          - Princess Marie Charlotte of Bavaria (1931–2018), married Paul, Prince of Quadt zu Wykradt und Isny (1930–2011) and issue
          - **Franz, Duke of Bavaria** (born 1933), head of the House of Wittelsbach (1996–present)
          - **(1)** Prince Max-Emanuel, Duke in Bavaria (born 1937)
            - Princess Sophie of Bavaria (born 1967), married Alois, Hereditary Prince of Liechtenstein (born 1968) and has issue
            - Princess Marie Caroline of Bavaria (born 1969), married Duke Philipp of Württemberg (born 1964) and has issue
            - Princess Helene of Bavaria (born 1972)
            - Princess Elisabeth of Bavaria (born 1973), married Daniel Terberger (born 1967) and has issue
            - Princess Maria Anna of Bavaria (born 1975), married twice and has issue
        - Prince Rudolf of Bavaria (1909–1912)
        - Prince Heinrich of Bavaria (1922–1958), married Anne Marie de Lustrac (1927–1999) without issue
        - Princess Irmingard of Bavaria (1923–2010), married Prince Ludwig of Bavaria (1913–2008), see issue below
        - Princess Editha of Bavaria (1924–2013), married twice and has issue
        - Princess Hilda of Bavaria (1926–2002), married Juan Bradstock Edgar Lockett de Loayza (1912–1987) and had issue
        - Princess Gabriele of Bavaria (1927–2019), married Carl Emmanuel, 14th Duke of Croÿ (1914–2011) and had issue
        - Princess Sophie of Bavaria (born 1935), married Jean, 12th Duke of Arenberg (1921–2011) and has issue
      - Princess Adelgunde of Bavaria (1870–1958), married William, Prince of Hohenzollern (1864–1927) without issue
      - Princess Maria Ludwiga Theresia of Bavaria (1872–1954), married Prince Ferdinand Pius, Duke of Castro (1869–1960) and had issue
      - Prince Karl of Bavaria (1874–1927)
      - Prince Franz of Bavaria (1875–1957)
        - Prince Ludwig of Bavaria (1913–2008)
          - **(2)** Prince Luitpold of Bavaria (born 1951)
            - Princess Auguste of Bavaria (born 1979), married Hereditary Prince Ferdinand of Lippe-Weißenfeld (born 1976) and has issue
            - Princess Alice of Bavaria (born 1981), married Prince Lukas of Auersperg (born 1981) and has issue
            - **(3)** Prince Ludwig of Bavaria (born 1982)
              - **(4)** Prince Rupprecht of Bavaria (born 2024)
            - **(5)** Prince Heinrich of Bavaria (born 1986)
              - **(6)** Prince Maximilian of Bavaria (born 2021)
              - **(7)** Prince Luitpold of Bavaria (born 2023)
            - **(8)** Prince Karl of Bavaria (born 10 March 1987)
          - Princess Maria of Bavaria (1953–1953)
          - Princess Philippa of Bavaria (1954–1953)
        - Princess Maria Elisabeth of Bavaria (1914–2011), married Prince Pedro Henrique of Orléans-Braganza (1909–1981) and had issue – including the current Head of the Imperial House of Brazil
        - Princess Adelgunde of Bavaria (1917–2004), married Baron Zdenko von Hoenning-O'Caroll (1906–1996) and had issue
        - Princess Eleonore of Bavaria (1918–2009), married Count Konstantin of Waldburg-Zeil (1909–1972) and had issue
        - Princess Dorothea of Bavaria (1920–2015), married Archduke Gottfried of Austria (1902–1984) and had issue
        - Prince Rasso of Bavaria (1926–2011)
          - Princess Maria Theresa of Bavaria (born 1956), married Count Tamбs Kornis de Gцncz-Ruszka (born 1949) and has issue
          - Prince Franz-Josef of Bavaria (1957–2022)
          - Princess Elisabeth of Bavaria (born 1959), married Count Andreas von Kuefstein (born 1954) and has issue
          - **(9)** Prince Wolfgang of Bavaria (born 1960)
            - **(10)** Prince Tassilo of Bavaria (born 1992)
            - **(11)** Prince Richard of Bavaria (born 1993)
            - **(12)** Prince Philip of Bavaria (born 1996)
            - Princess Flavia of Bavaria (born 2011)
          - Princess Benedikta of Bavaria (born 1961), married Count Rudolf von Freyberg-Eisenberg (born 1958) and has issue
          - **(13)** Prince Christoph of Bavaria (born 1962)
            - **(14)** Prince Corbinian of Bavaria (born 1996)
            - **(15)** Prince Stanislaus of Bavaria (born 1997)
            - **(16)** Prince Marcello of Bavaria (born 1998)
            - Princess Odilia of Bavaria (born 2002)
          - Princess Gisela of Bavaria (born 1964), married Prince Alexander of Saxony (born 1954) and has issue
      - Princess Mathilde of Bavaria (1877–1906), married Prince Ludwig Gaston of Saxe-Coburg and Gotha (1870–1942) and had issue
      - Prince Wolfgang of Bavaria (1879–1895)
      - Princess Hildegard of Bavaria (1881–1948)
      - Princess Notburga of Bavaria (1883–1883)
      - Princess Wiltrud of Bavaria (1884–1975), married Wilhelm Karl, Duke of Urach (1864–1928) without issue
      - Princess Helmtrud of Bavaria (1886–1977)
      - Princess Dietlinde of Bavaria (1888–1889)
      - Princess Gundelinde of Bavaria (1891–1983), married Count Johann Georg of Preysing-Lichtenegg-Moos (1887–1924) and had issue
    - Prince Leopold of Bavaria (1846–1930)
      - Princess Elisabeth Marie of Bavaria (1874–1957), married Count Otto of Seefried and Buttenheim (1870–1951) and had issue
      - Princess Auguste of Bavaria (1875–1964), married Archduke Joseph August of Austria (1872–1962) and had issue
      - Prince Georg of Bavaria (1880–1943), married Archduchess Isabella of Austria (1888–1973) without issue
      - Prince Konrad of Bavaria (1883–1969)
        - Princess Amalie Isabella of Bavaria (1921–1985), married Count Umberto Poletti Galimberti, Count di Assandri (1921–1995) and had issue
        - Prince Eugen of Bavaria (1925–1997), married Countess Helene von Khevenhüller-Metsch (1921–2017) without issue
    - Princess Therese of Bavaria (1850–1925)
    - Prince Arnulf of Bavaria (1852–1907)
      - Prince Heinrich of Bavaria (1884–1916)
  - Princess Adelgunde of Bavaria (1823–1914), married Francis V, Duke of Modena (1819–1875) and had issue
  - Princess Hildegard of Bavaria (1825–1864), married Archduke Albrecht, Duke of Teschen (1817–1895) and had issue
  - Princess Alexandra of Bavaria (1826–1875)
  - Prince Adalbert of Bavaria (1828–1875)
    - Prince Ludwig Ferdinand of Bavaria (1859–1949)
      - Prince Ferdinand of Bavaria (1884–1958), married twice and renounced his rights to the Bavarian throne in 1914
      - Prince Adalbert of Bavaria (1886–1970)
        - Prince Konstantin of Bavaria (1920–1969)
          - **(17)** Prince Leopold of Bavaria (born 1943)
            - **(18)** Prince Manuel of Bavaria (born 1972)
              - **(19)** Prince Leopold of Bavaria (born 2007)
              - Princess Alva of Bavaria (born 2010)
              - **(20)** Prince Gabriel of Bavaria (born 2014)
              - **(21)** Prince Joseph of Bavaria (born 2019)
            - Princess Maria del Pilar of Bavaria (born 1978)
            - Princess Maria Felipa of Bavaria (born 1981), married Christian Dienst (born 1978) and has issue
            - **(22)** Prince Konstantin of Bavaria (born 1986)
              - **(23)** Prince Alexis of Bavaria (born 2020)
              - **(24)** Prince Nikolaus of Bavaria (born 2023)
          - **(25)** Prince Adalbert of Bavaria (born 1944)
            - Princess Bernadette of Bavaria (born 1986), married Carmelo Milici (born 1987) and has issue
            - **(26)** Prince Hubertus of Bavaria (born 1989)
          - Princess Ysabel of Bavaria (born 1954), married Count Alfred Hoyos (born 1951) and has issue
        - Prince Alexander of Bavaria (1923–2001)
    - Prince Alfons of Bavaria (1862–1933)
      - Prince Joseph Clemens of Bavaria (1902–1990)
      - Princess Elisabeth of Bavaria (1913–2005), married twice and had issue
    - Princess Isabella of Bavaria (1863–1924), married Prince Tommaso, Duke of Genoa (1854–1931) and had issue
    - Princess Elvira of Bavaria (1868–1943), married Count Rudolf von Wrbna-Kaunitz-Rietberg-Questenberg und Freudenthal (1864–1927) and had issue
    - Princess Clara of Bavaria (1874–1941)

== Gallery of the Bavarian kings ==
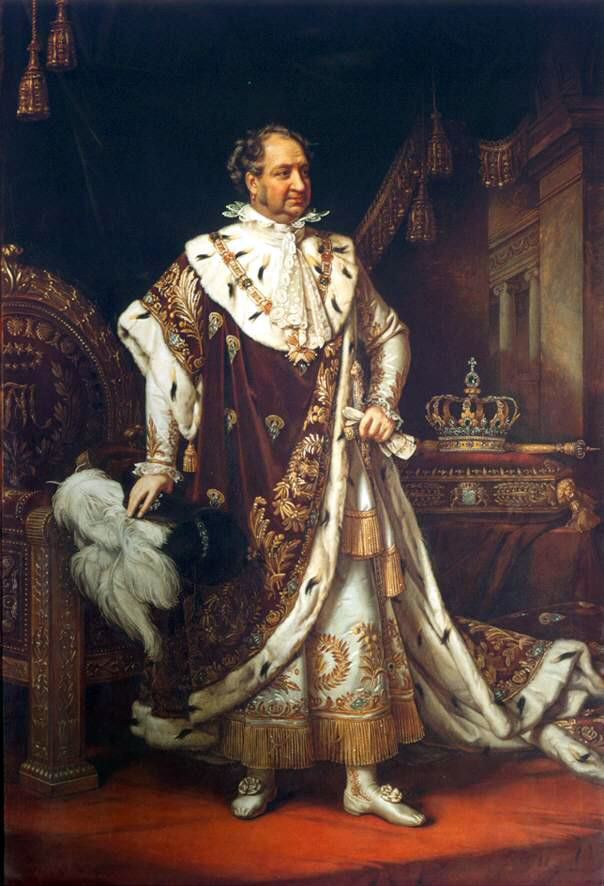
Max I. Joseph (1806–1825)

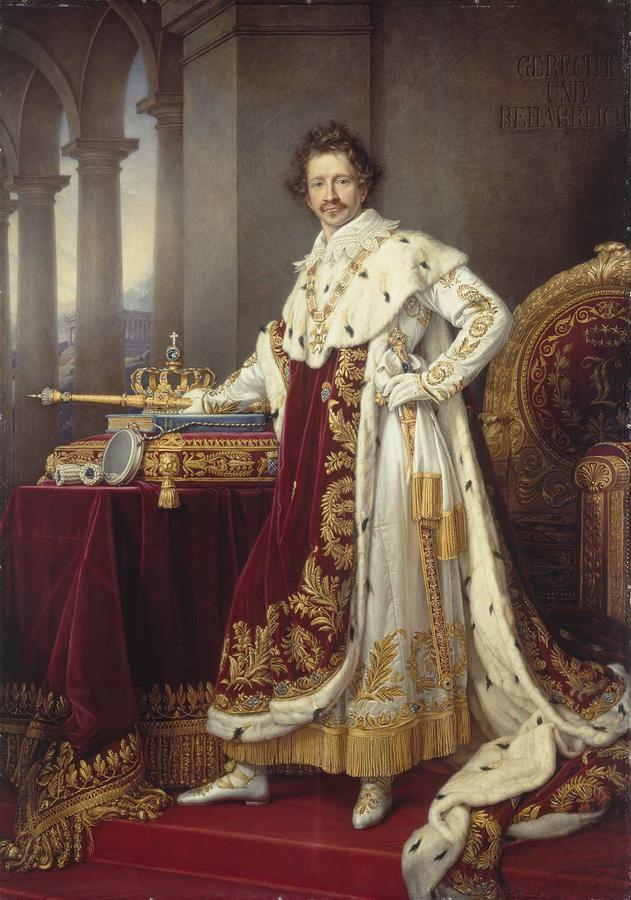
Ludwig I. (1825–1848)

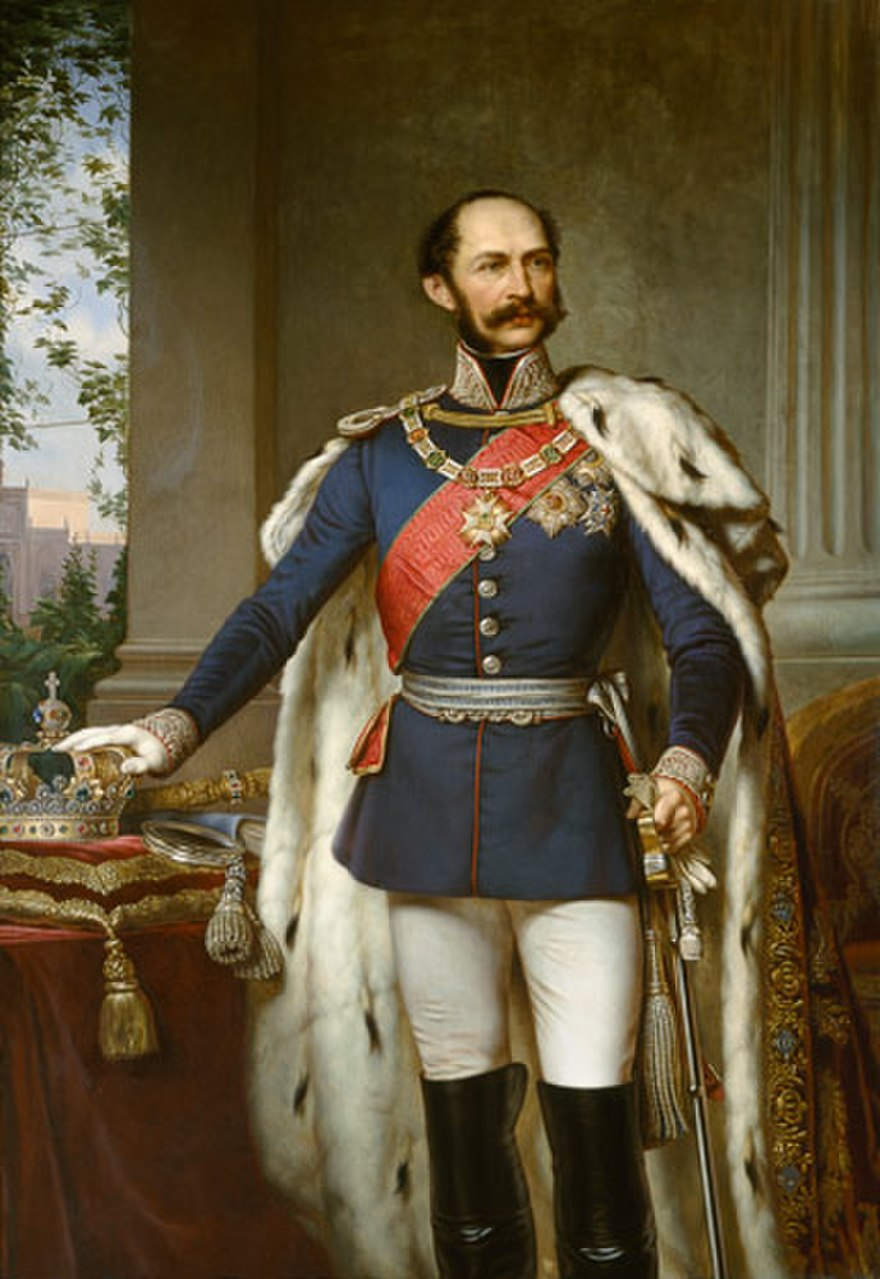
Maximilian II. (1848–1864)

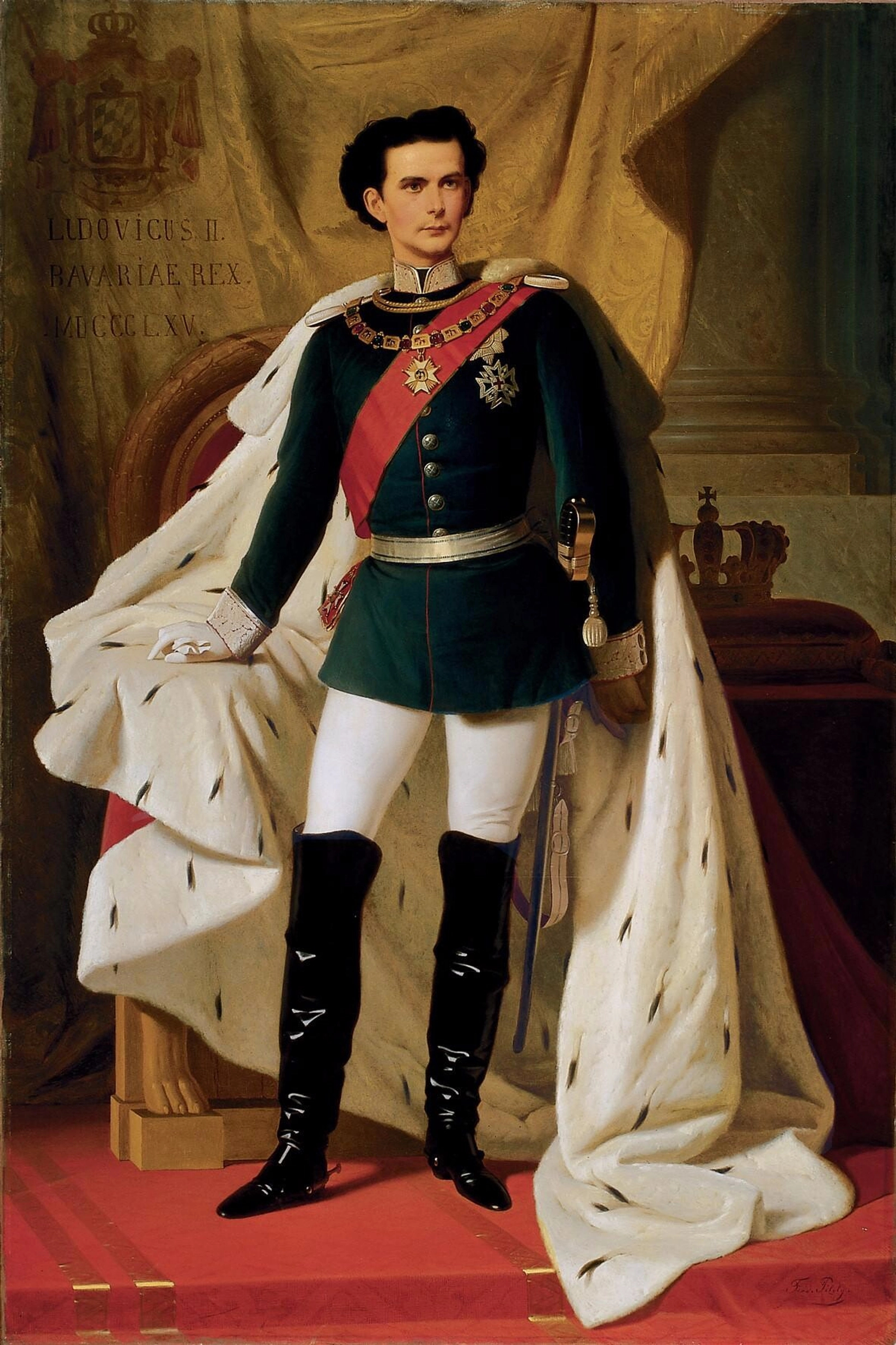
Ludwig II. (1864–1886)

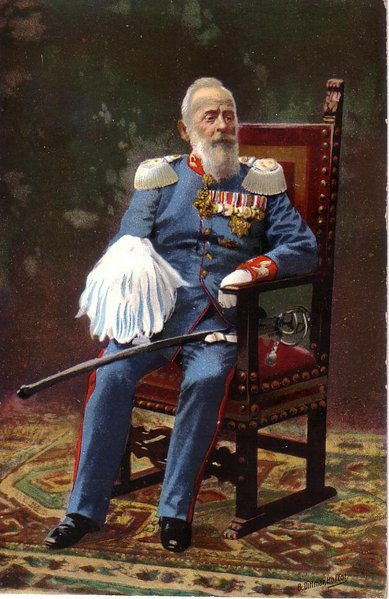
Prinzregent Luitpold (1886–1912)

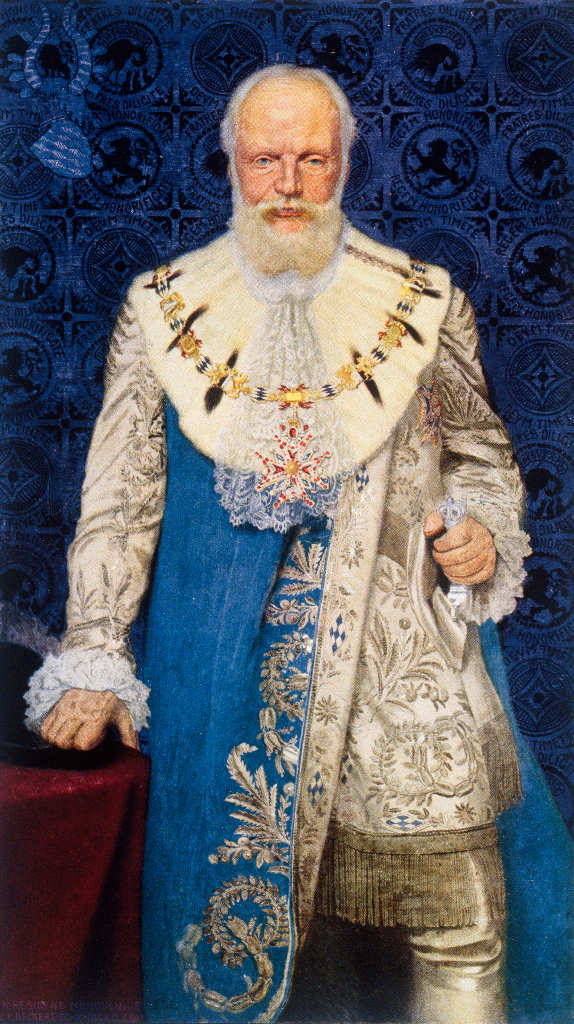
Ludwig III. (1913–1918)

== Castles and palaces ==
=== Bavaria ===
Some of the most important Bavarian castles and palaces that were built by Wittelsbach rulers, or served as seats of ruling branch lines, are the following:

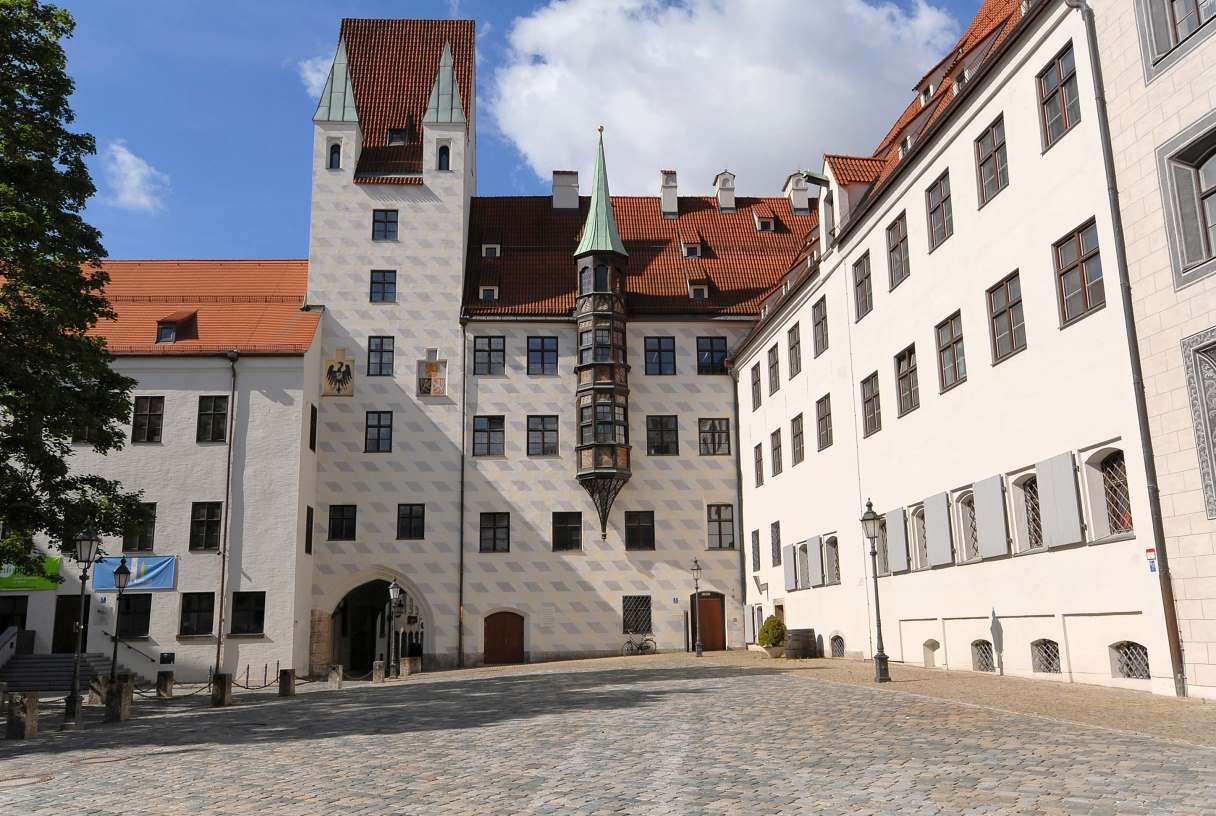
The Old Court in Munich

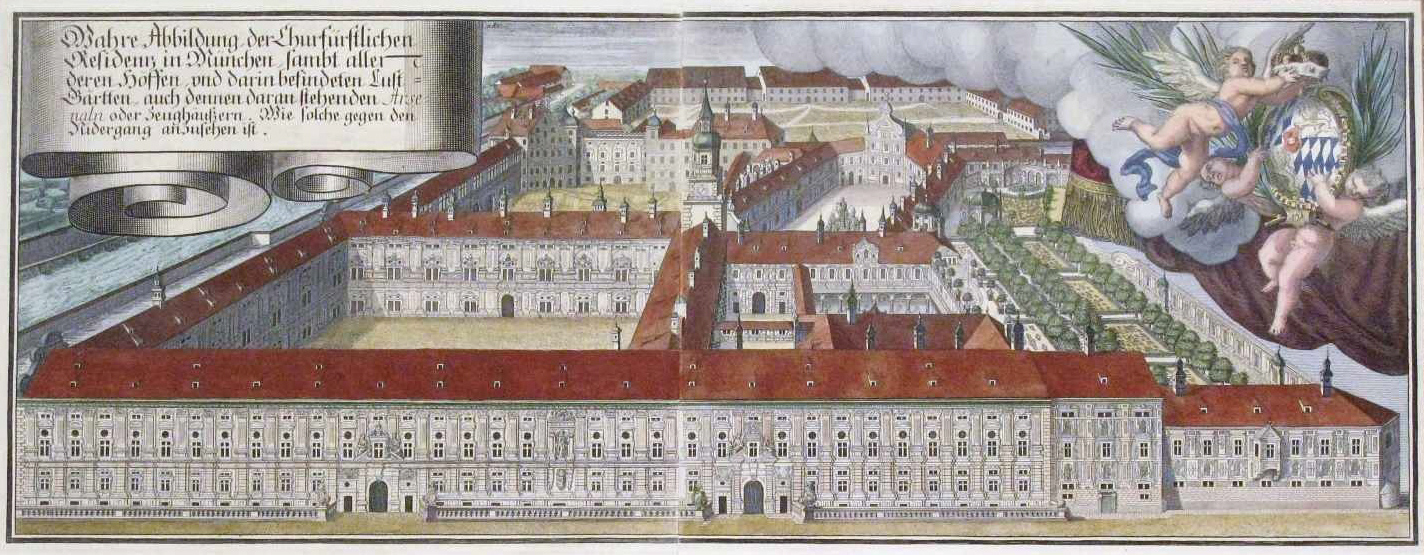
Munich Residenz by Michael Wening

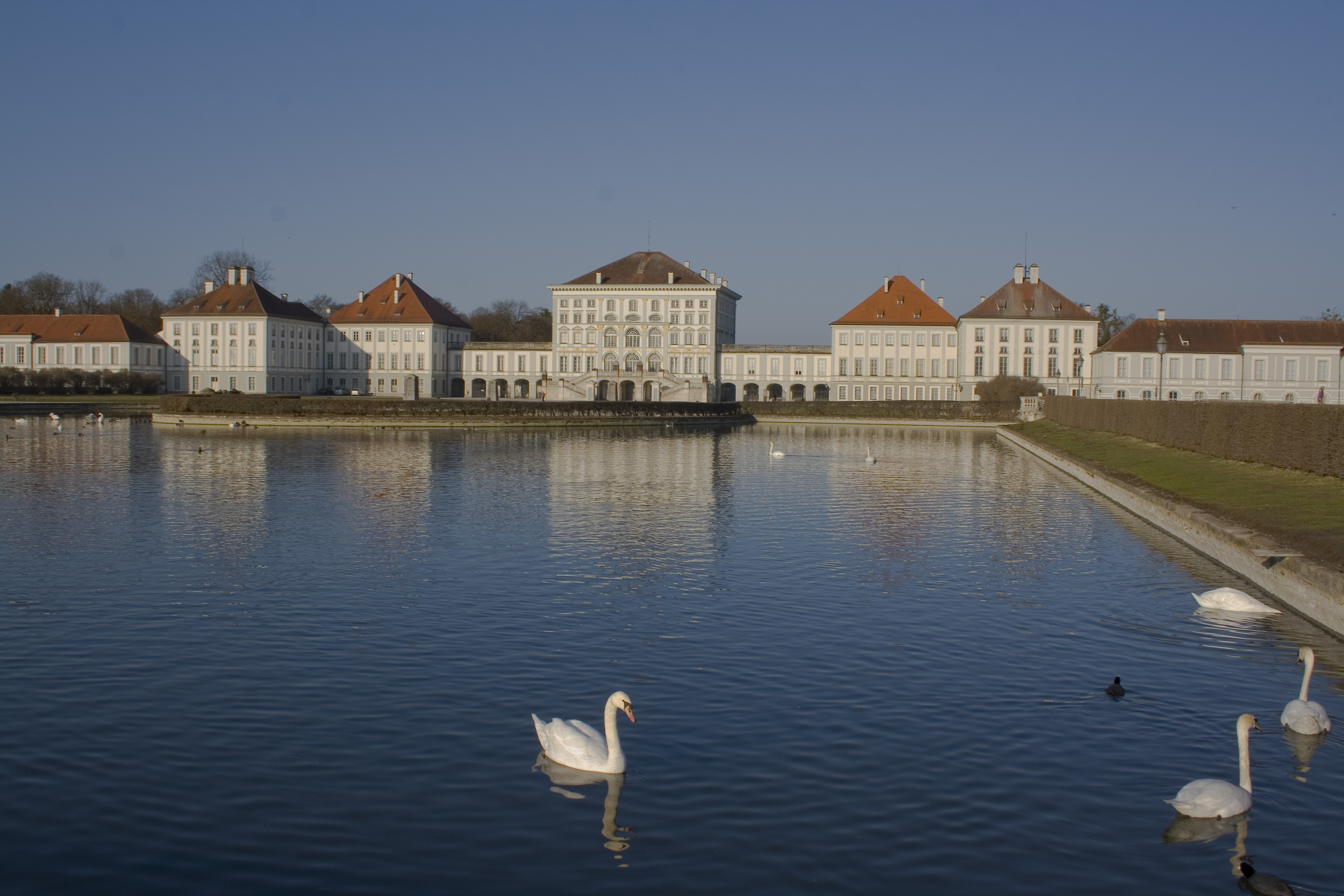
Nymphenburg Palace in Munich

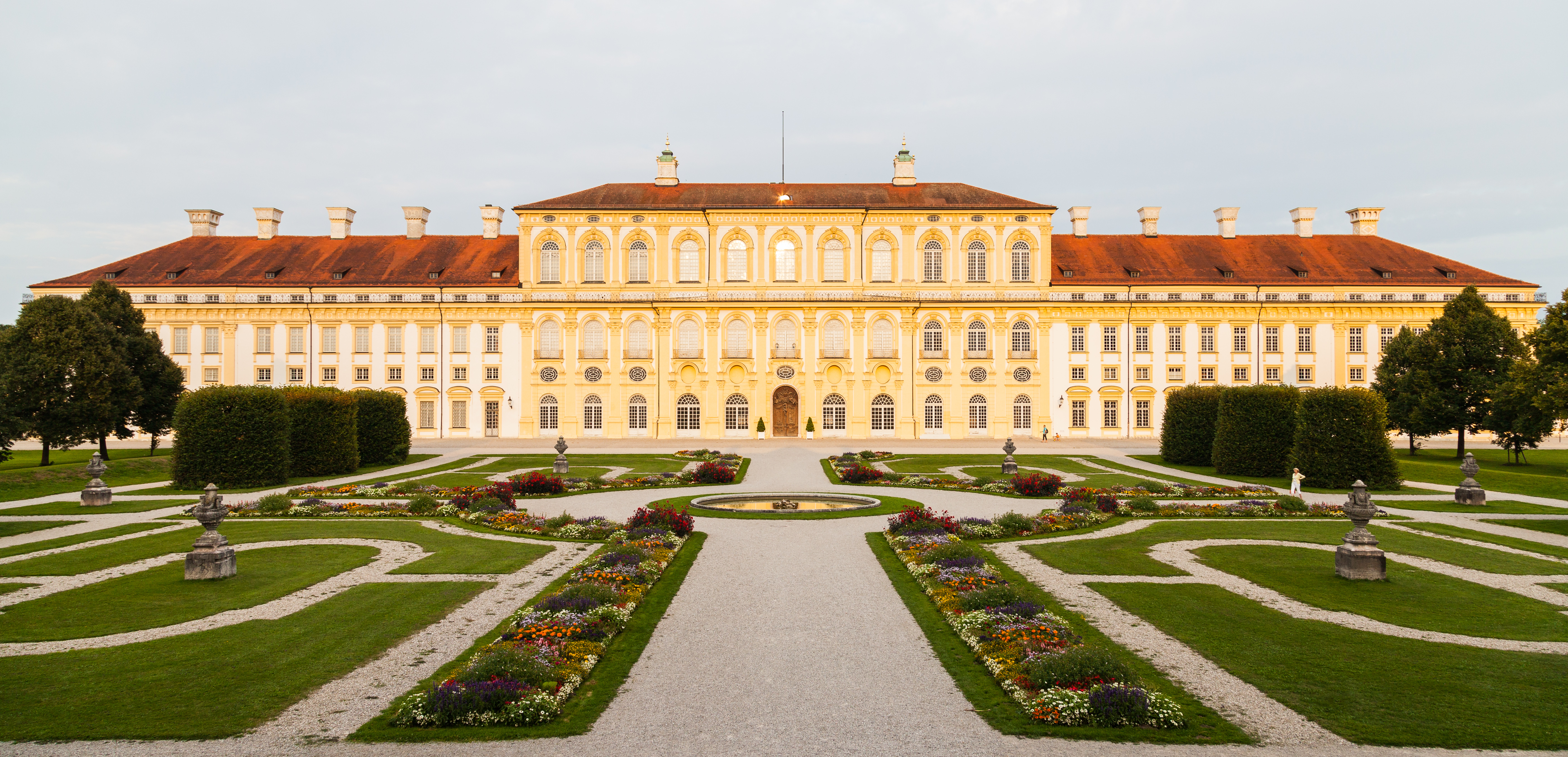
Schleissheim Palace in Munich

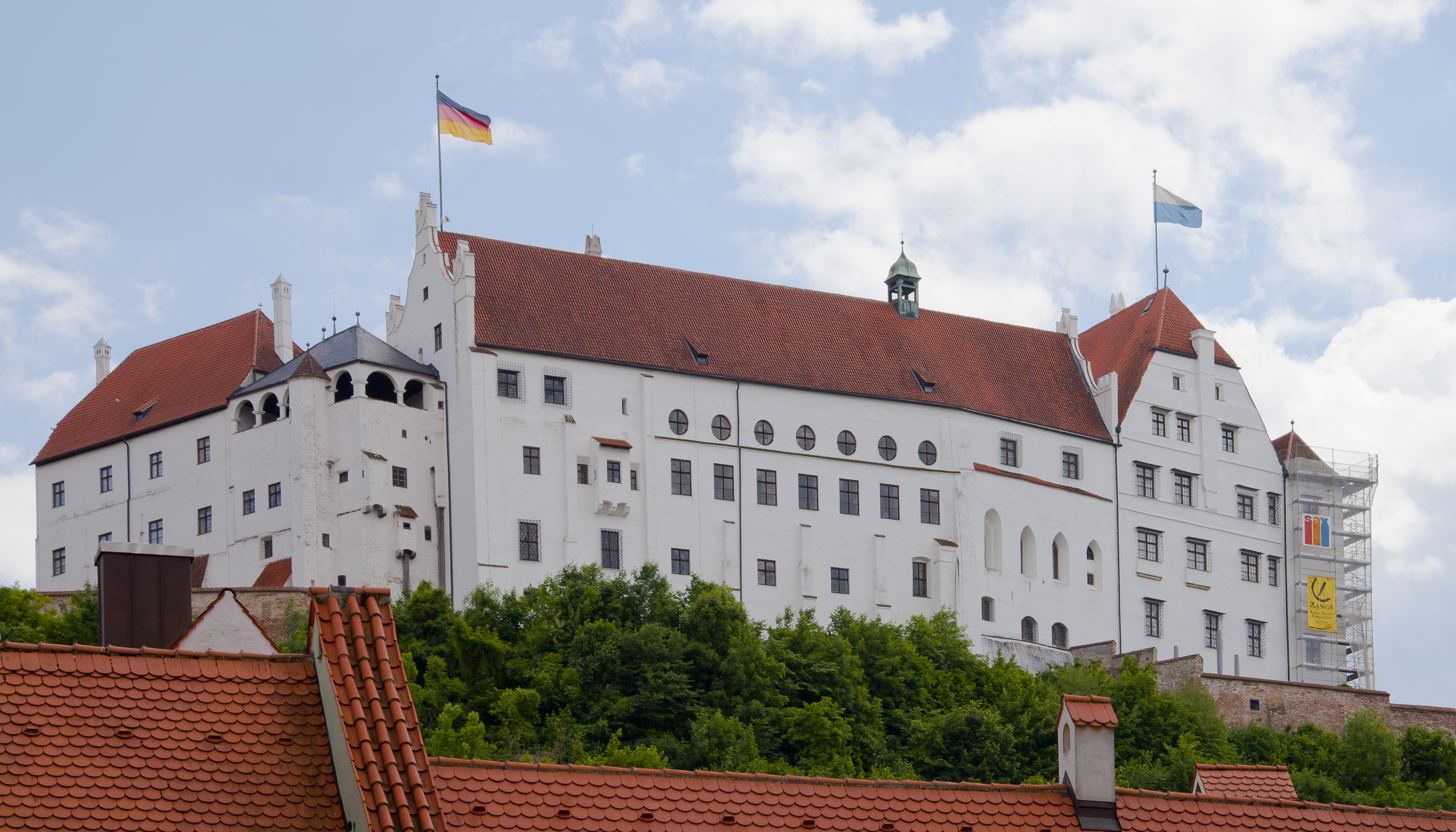
Trausnitz Castle in Landshut

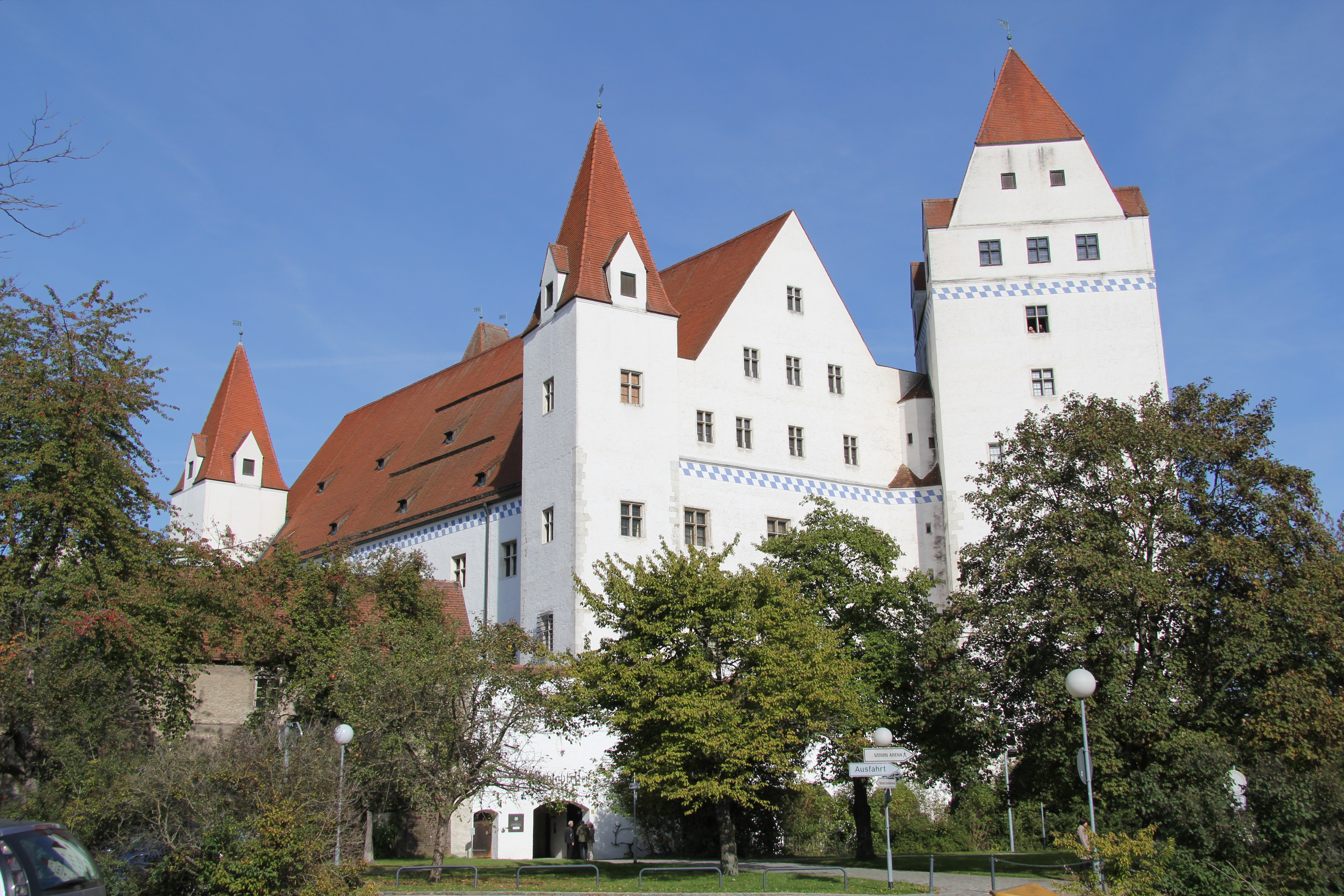
Ingolstadt Castle

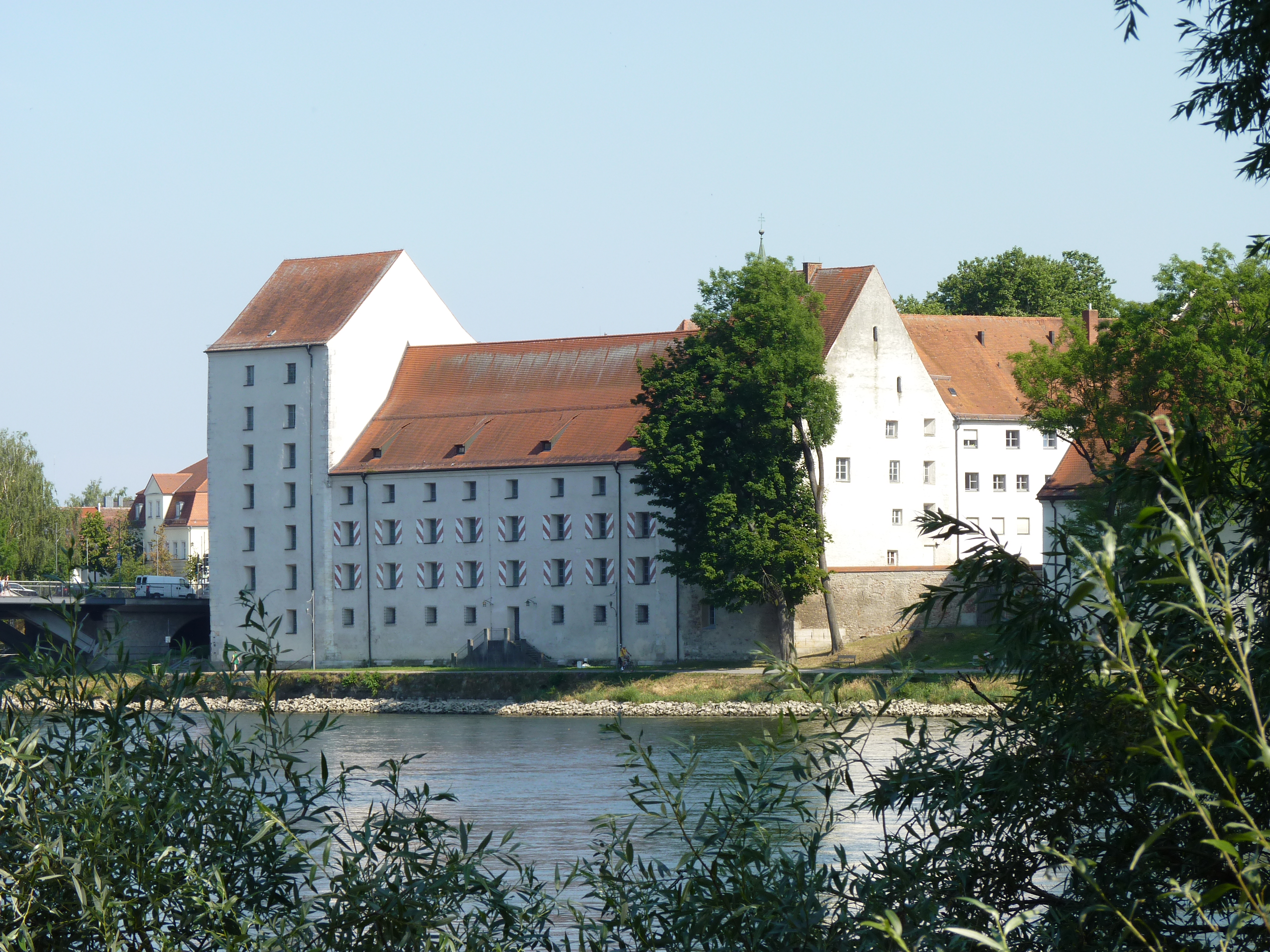
Straubing Castle

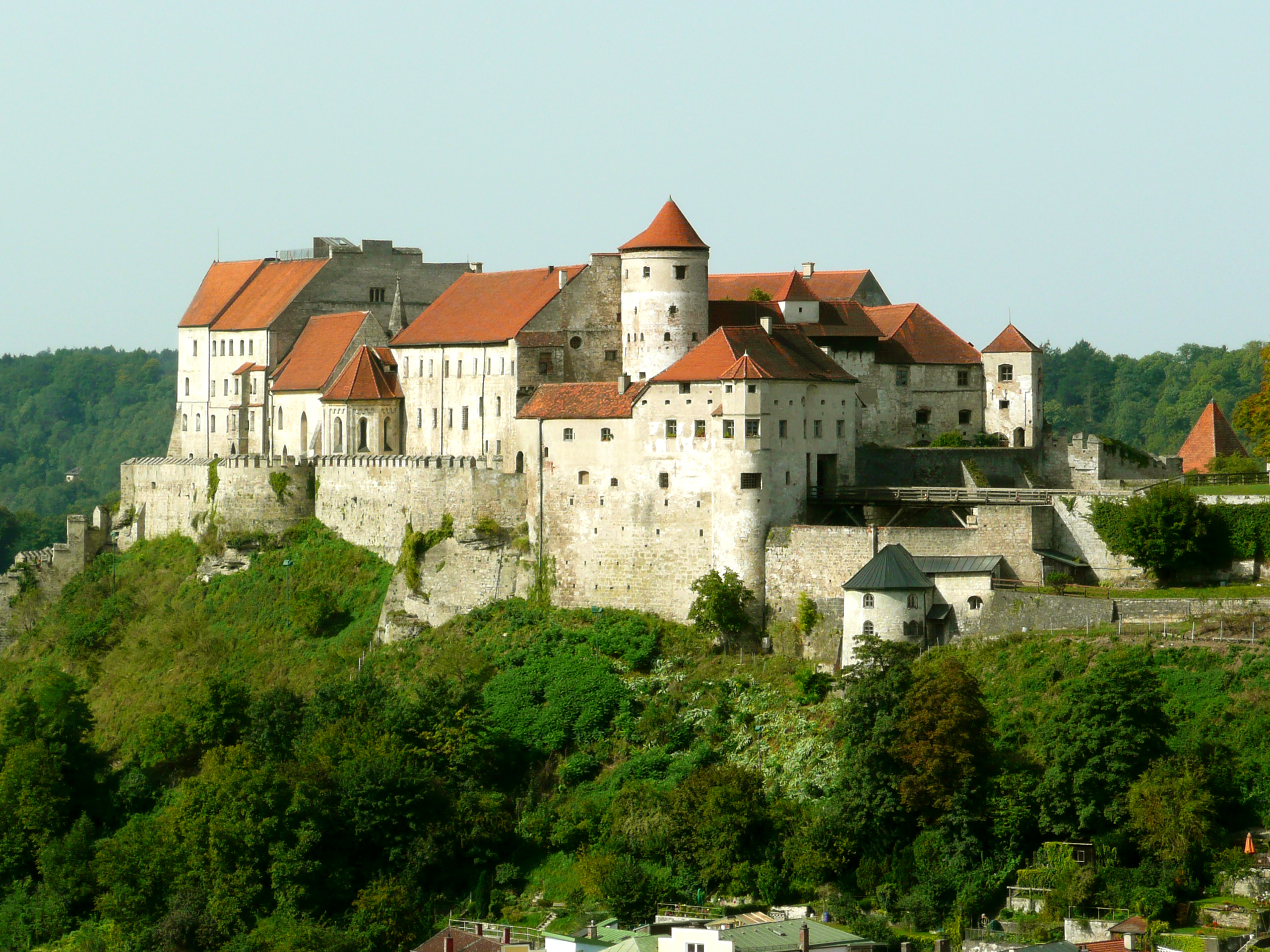
Burghausen Castle

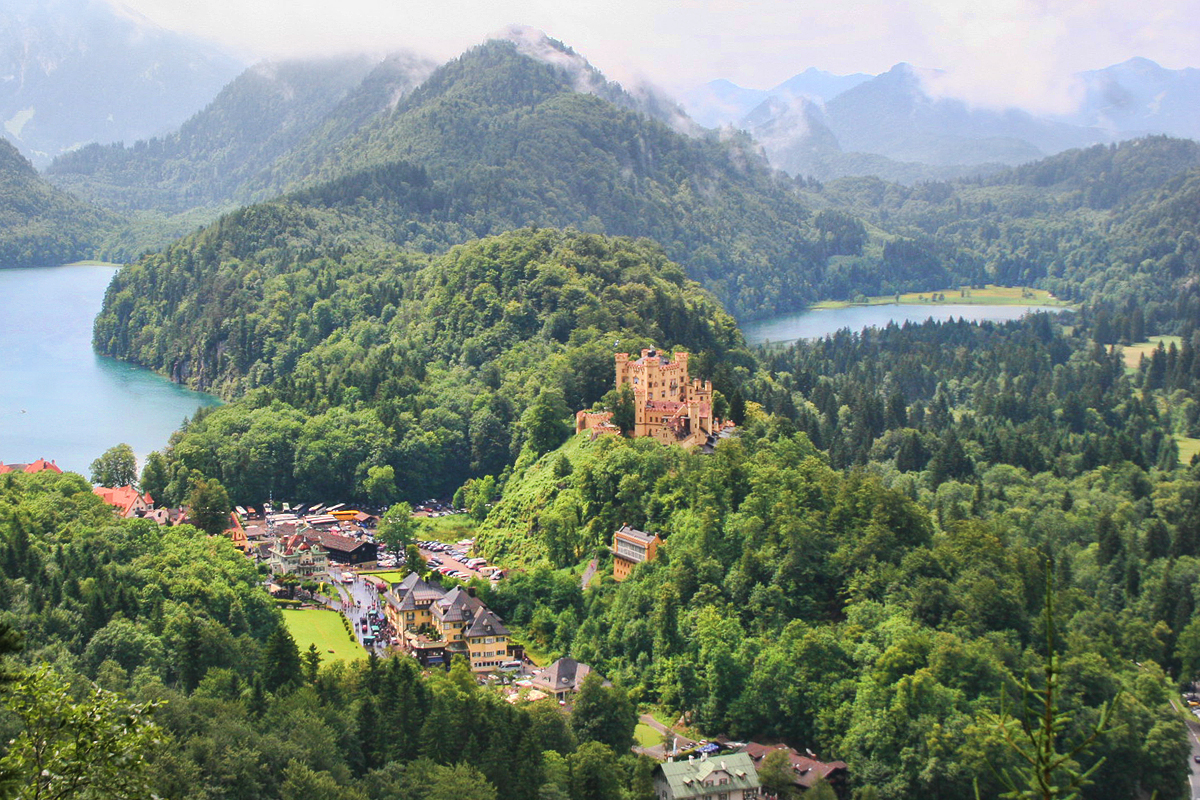
Hohenschwangau Castle

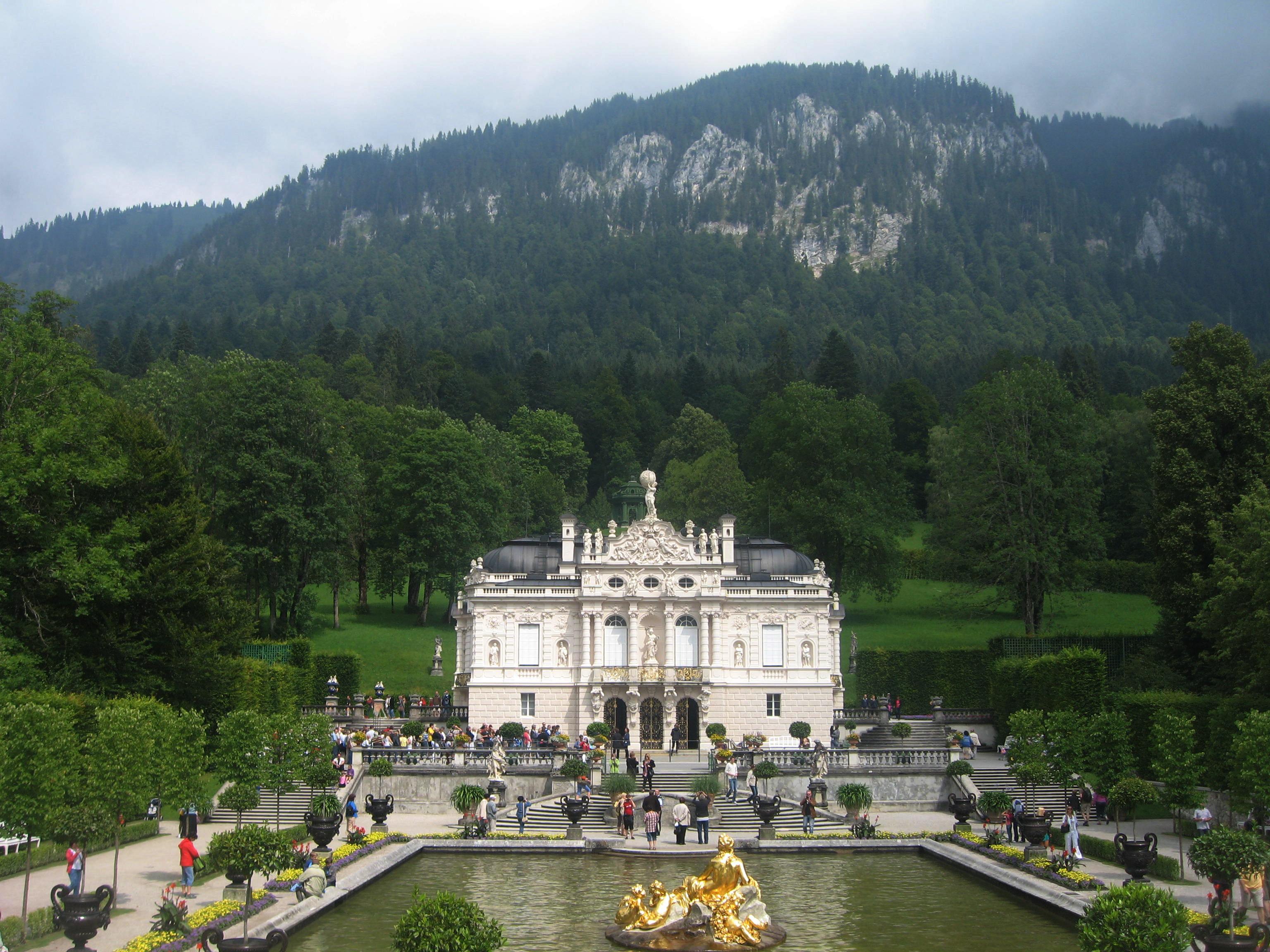
Linderhof Palace

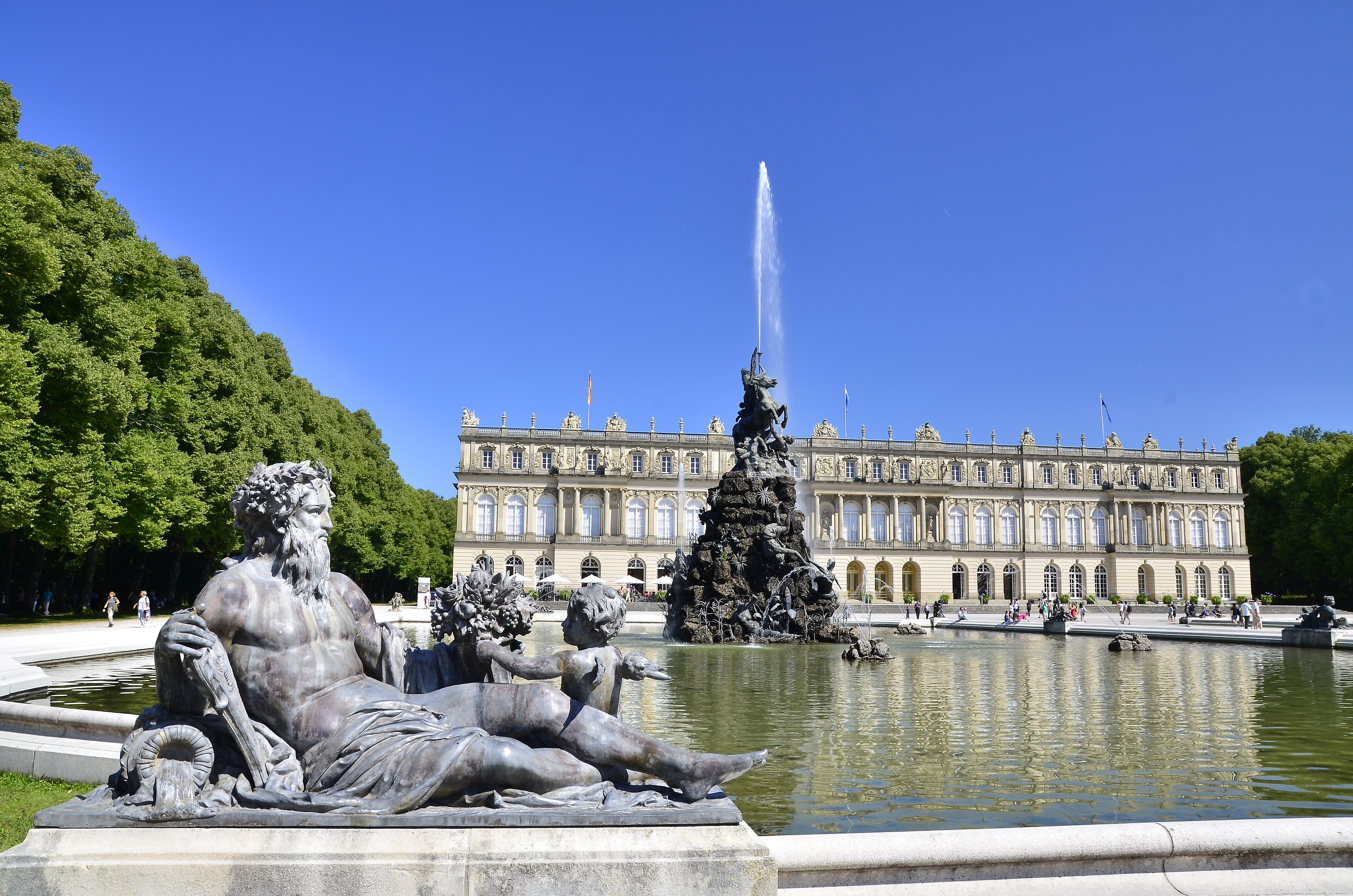
Herrenchiemsee Palace

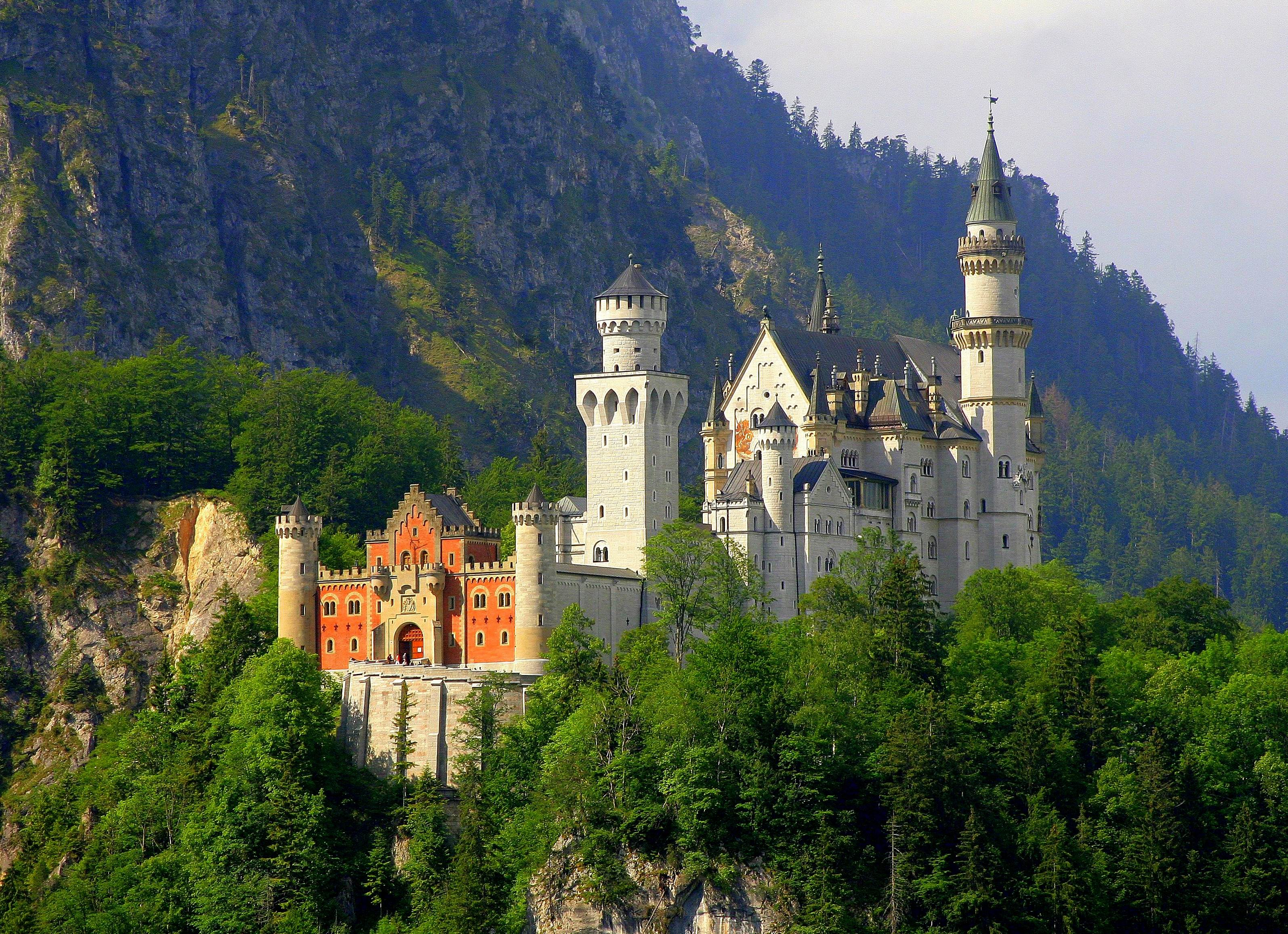
Neuschwanstein Castle

=== Palatinate branch ===
Some of the most important castles and palaces of the Palatinate Wittelsbach were:

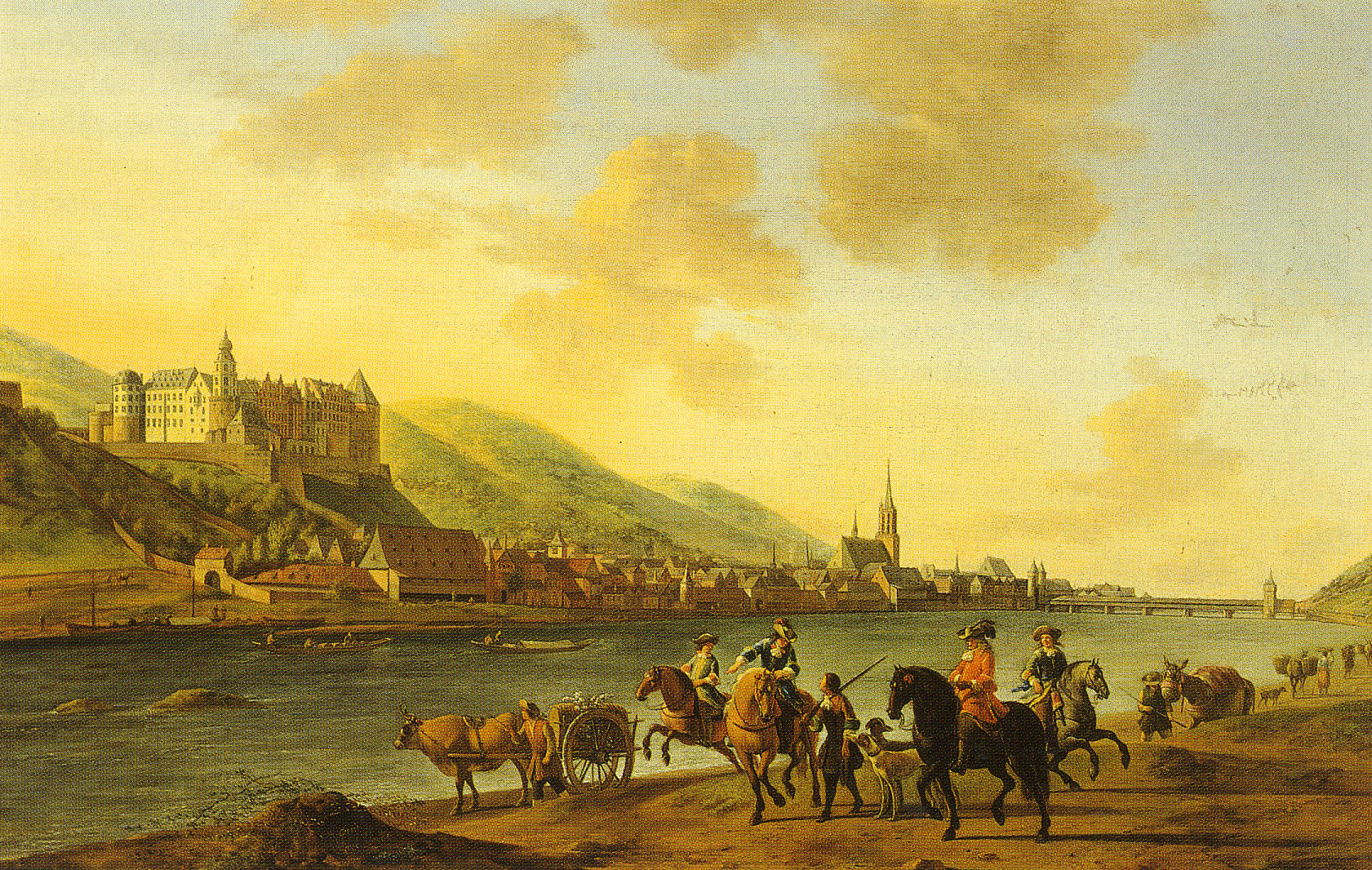
Heidelberg Castle 1670

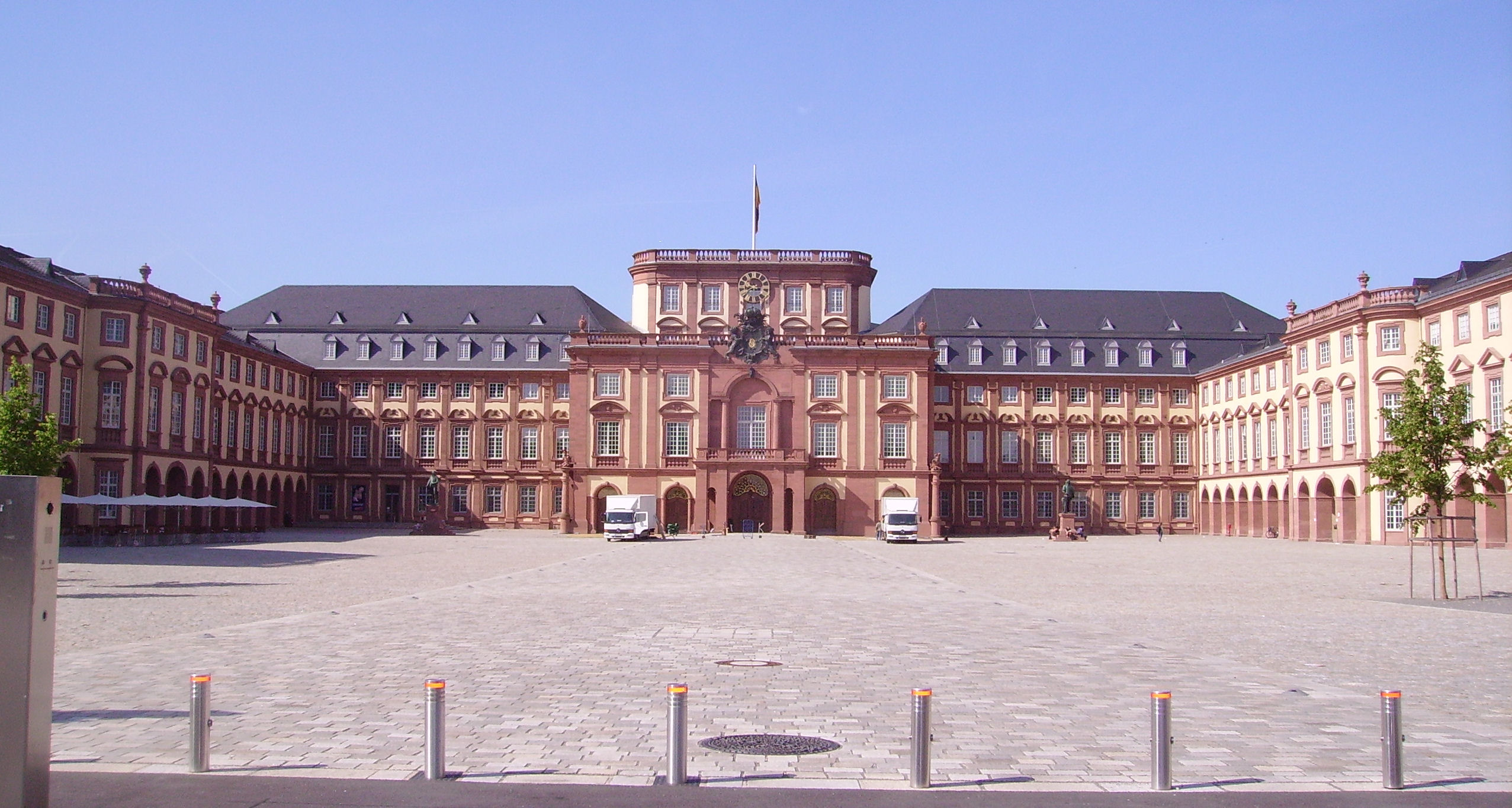
Mannheim Palace

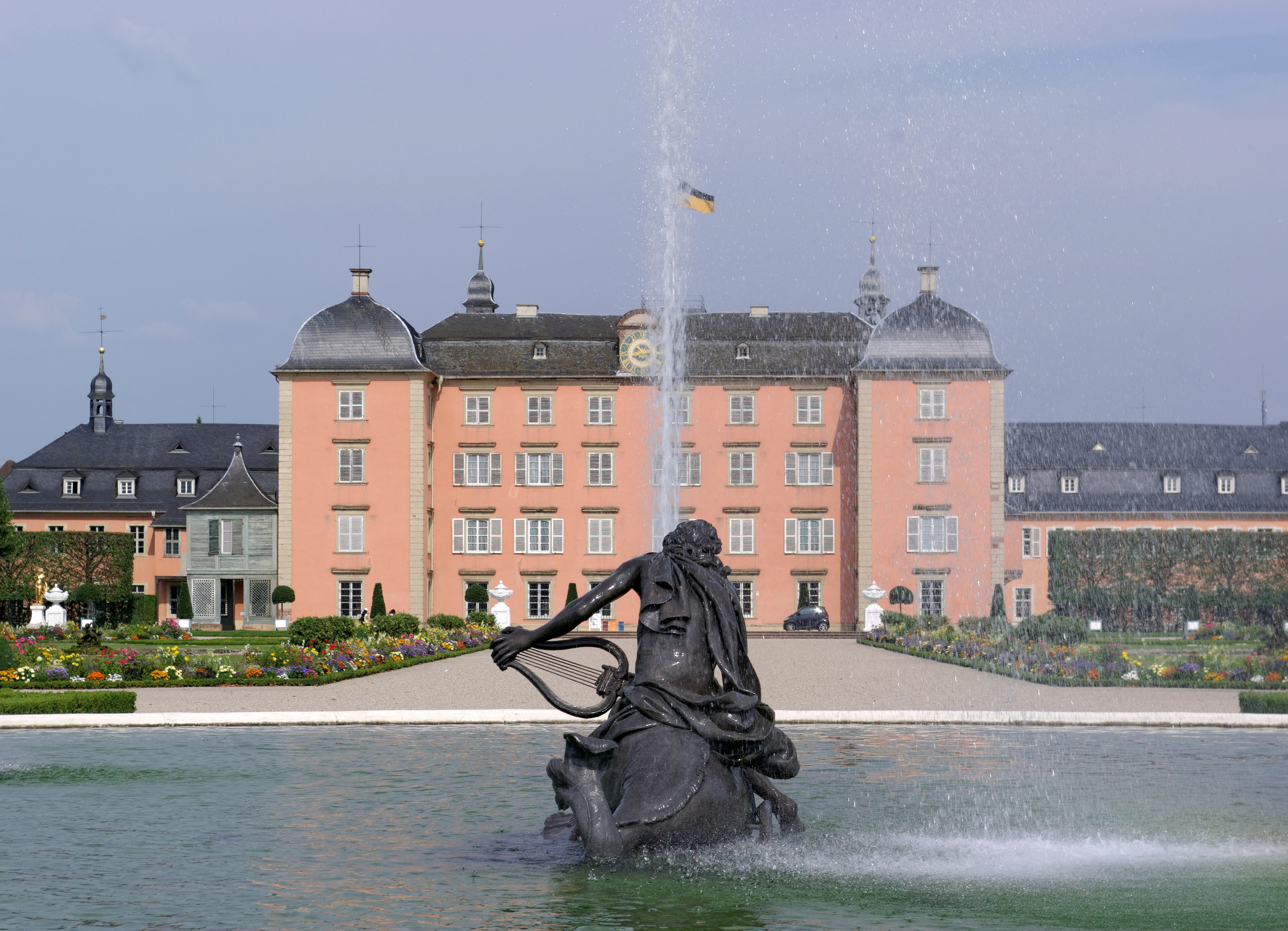
Schwetzingen Castle

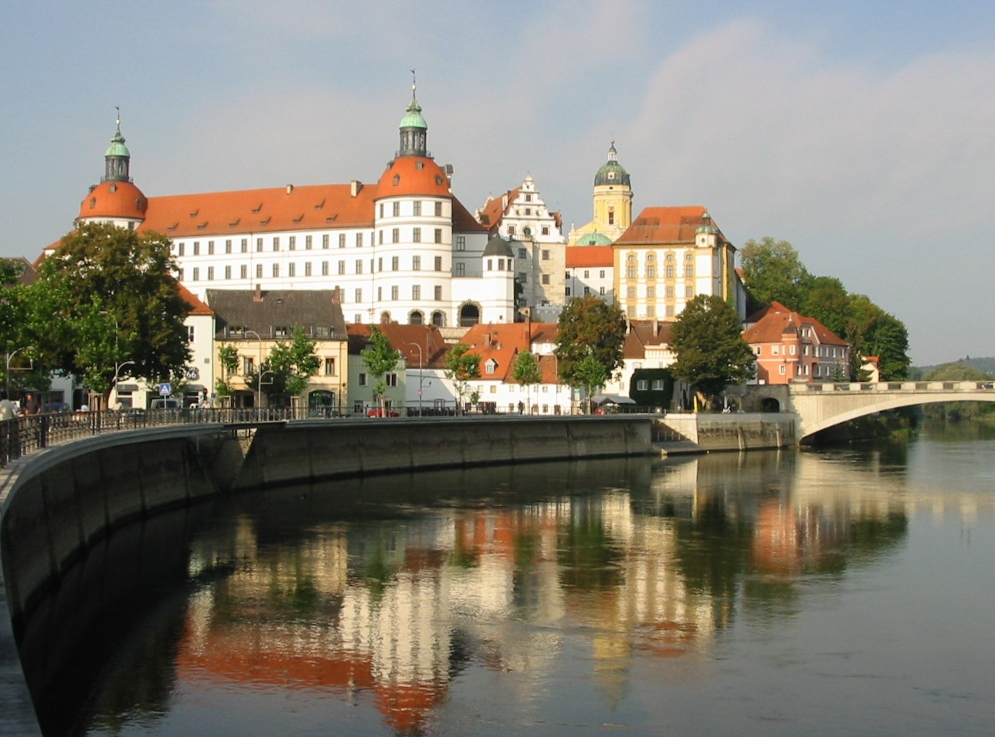
Neuburg Castle (Bavaria)

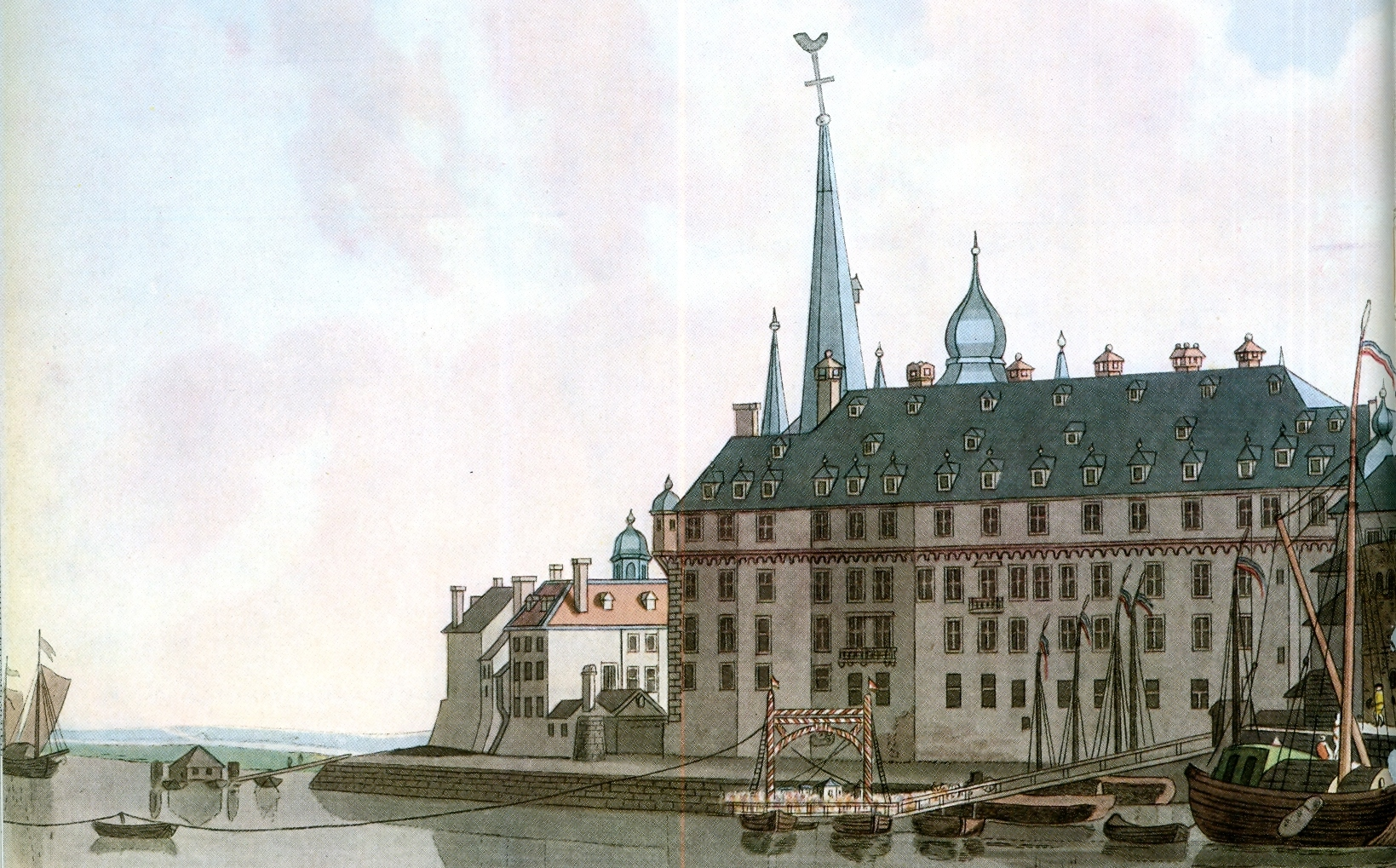
Düsseldorf Castle

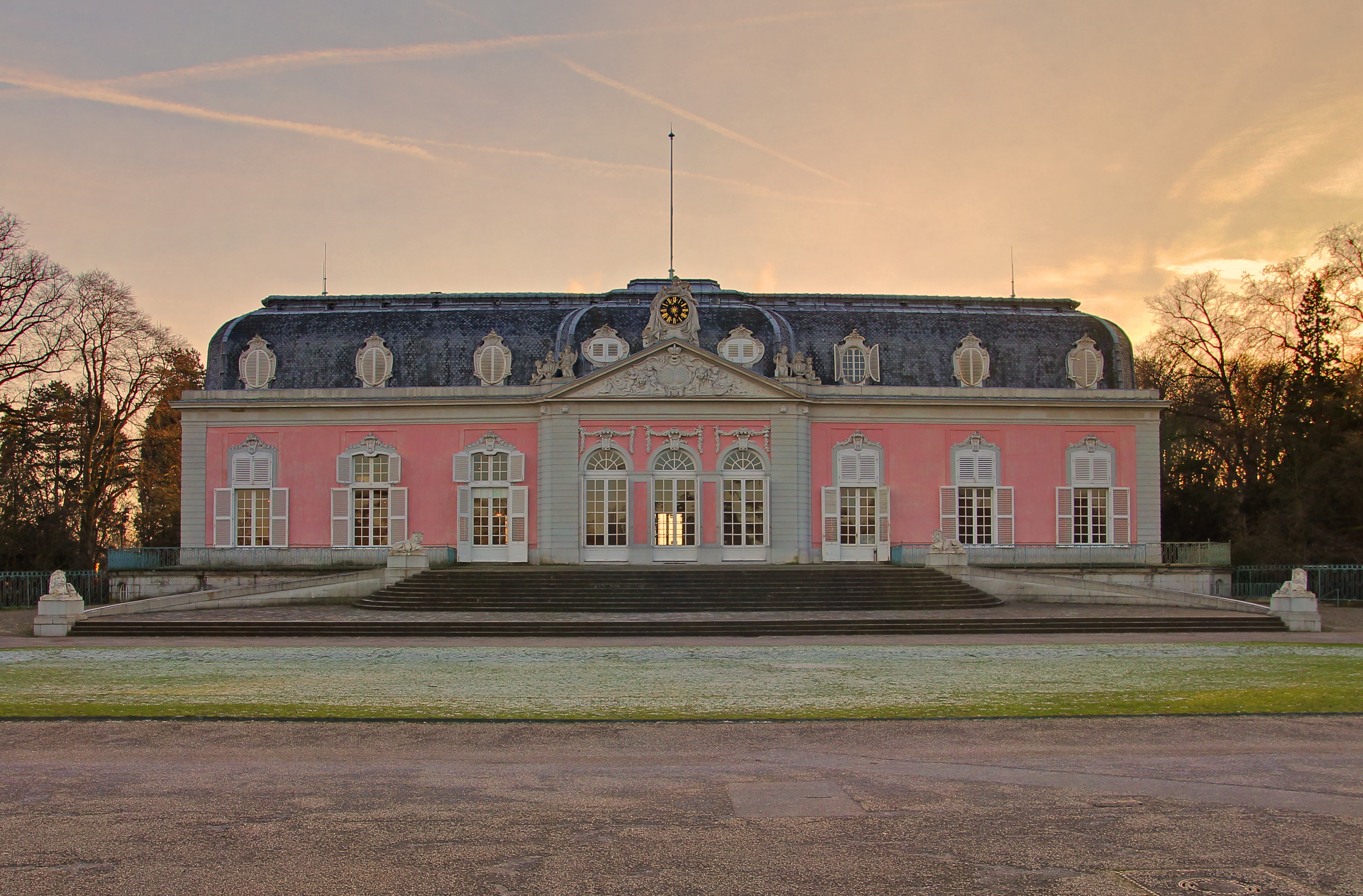
Benrath Mansion in Düsseldorf

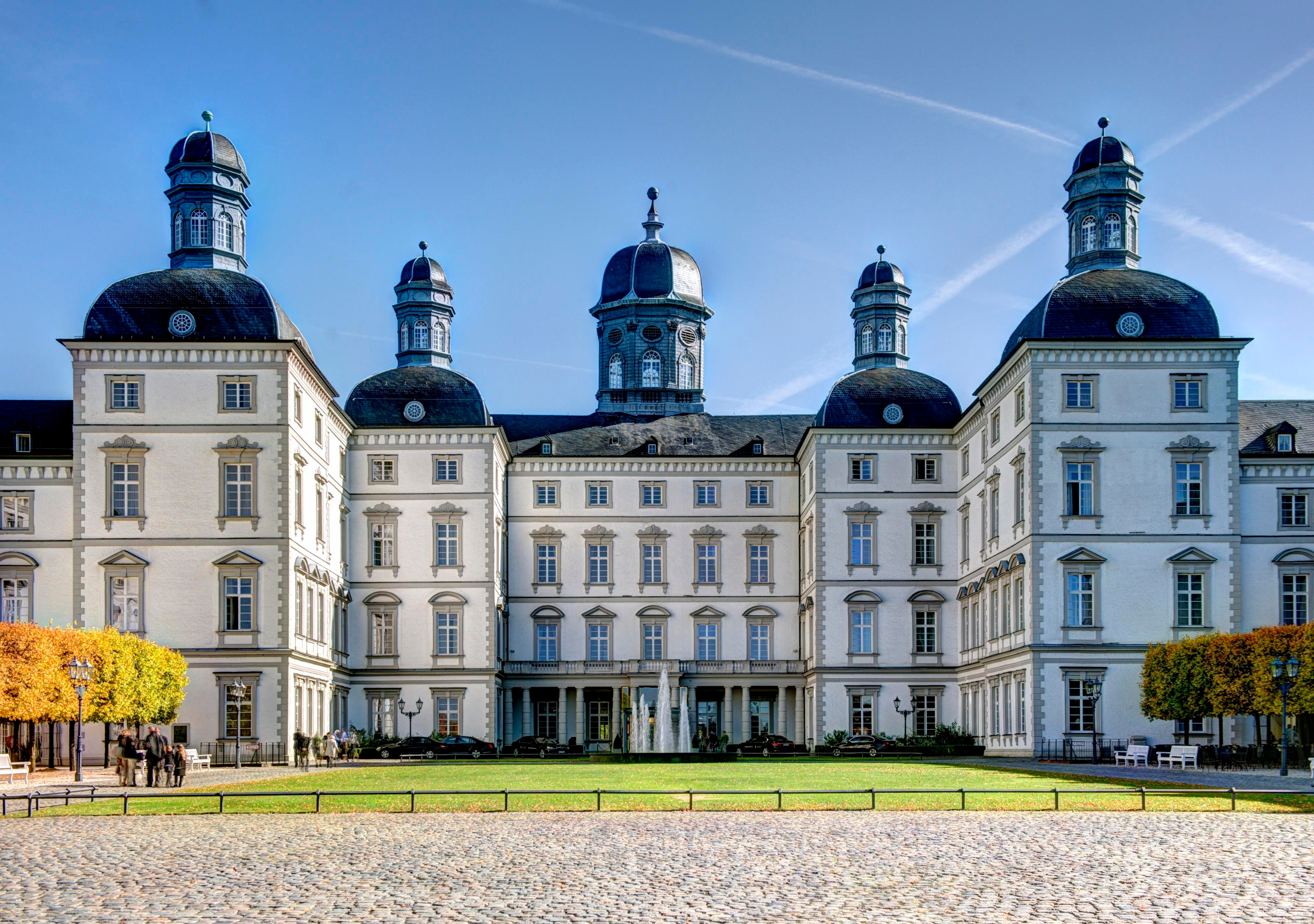
Bensberg Castle

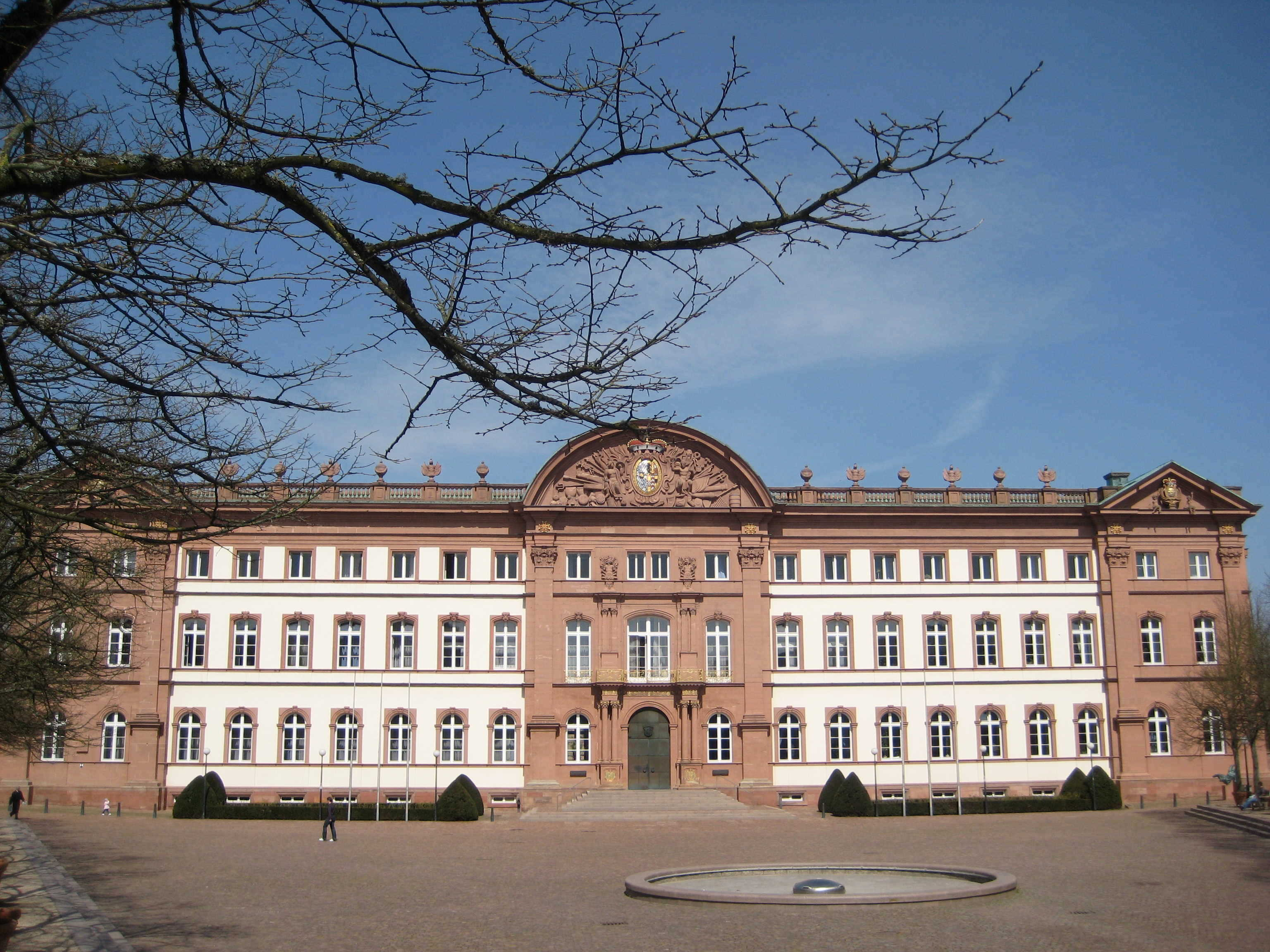
Zweibrücken Castle

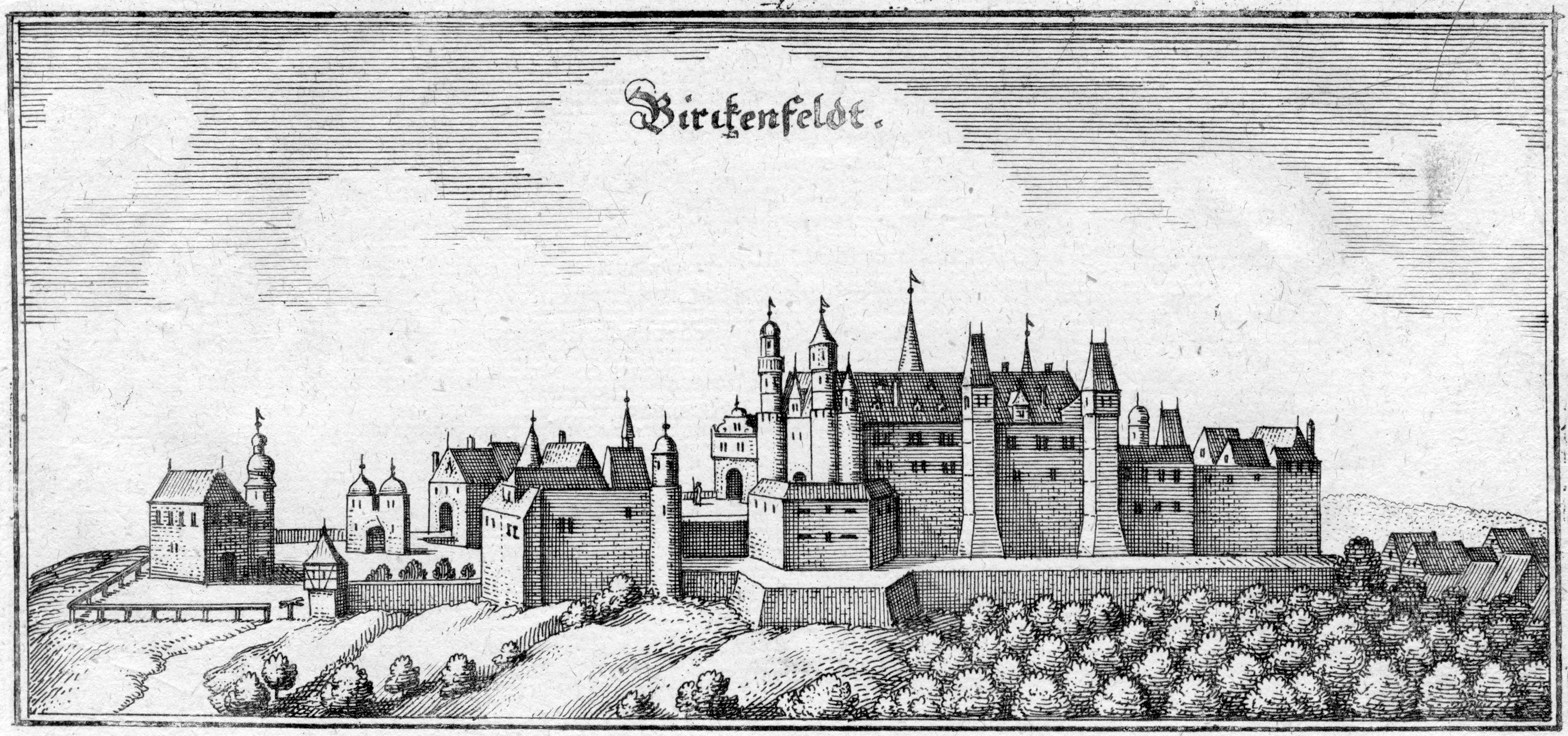
Birkenfeld Castle 1645

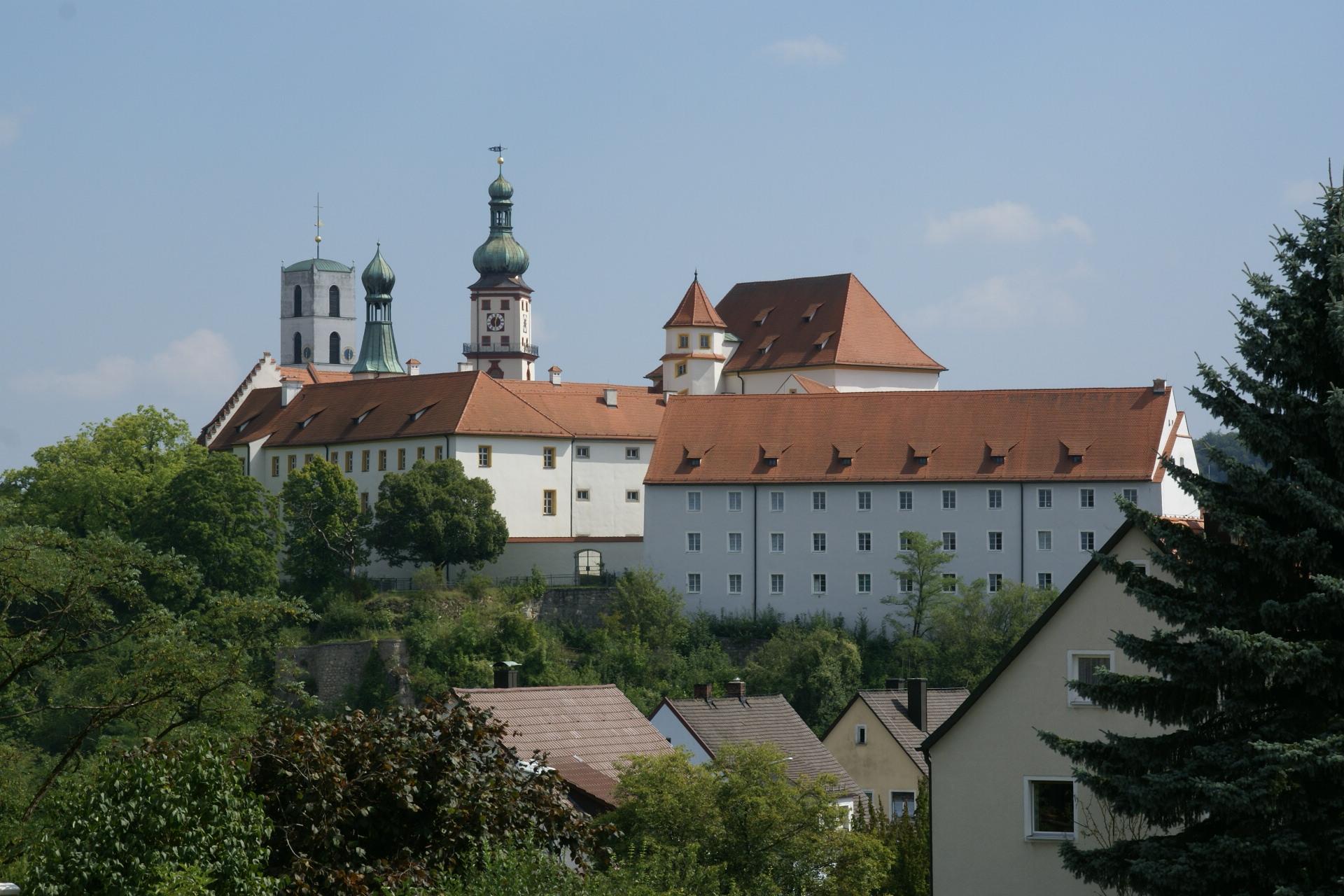
Sulzbach Castle

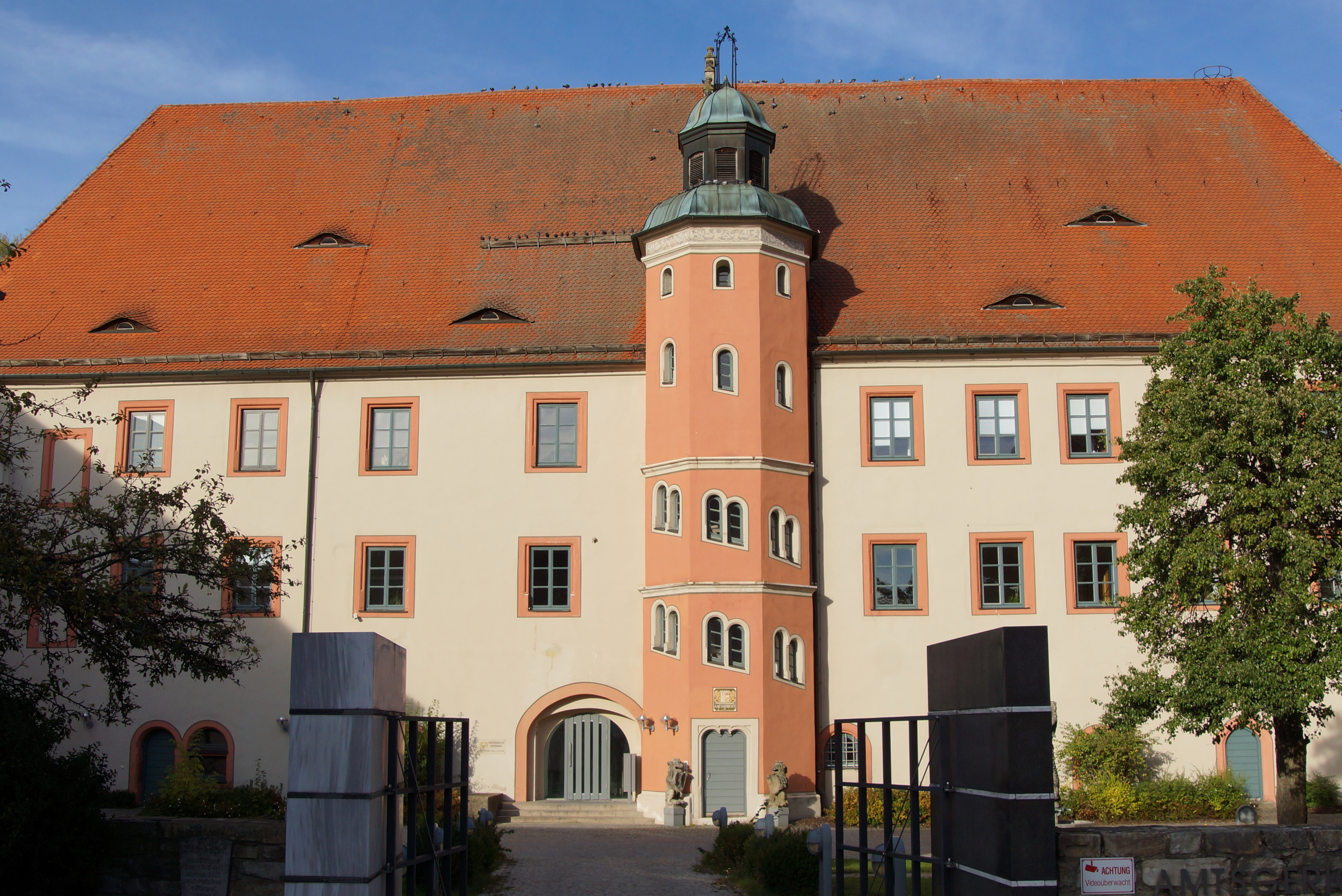
Neumarkt Castle

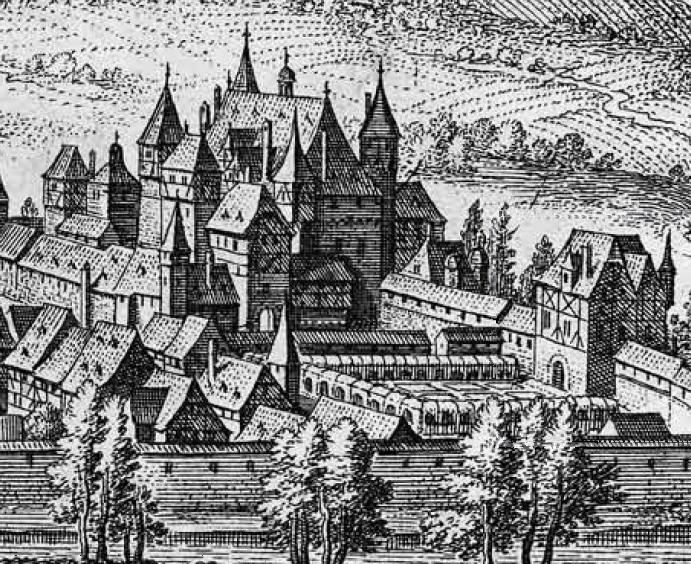
Simmern Castle 1648

=== Electorate of Cologne ===
From 1597 to 1794, Bonn was the capital of the Electorate of Cologne and residence of the Archbishops and Prince-electors of Cologne, most of them belonging to the Bavarian branch of the House of Wittelsbach (continuously from 1583 to 1761).

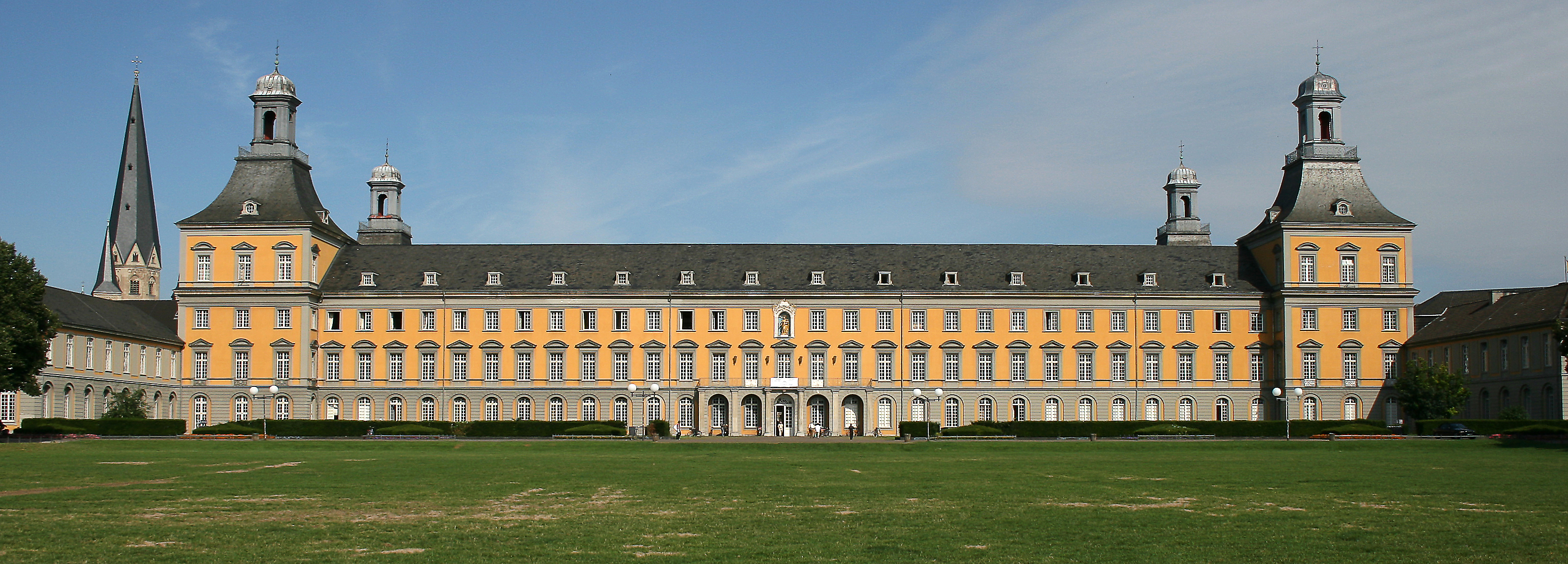
Electoral Palace, Bonn

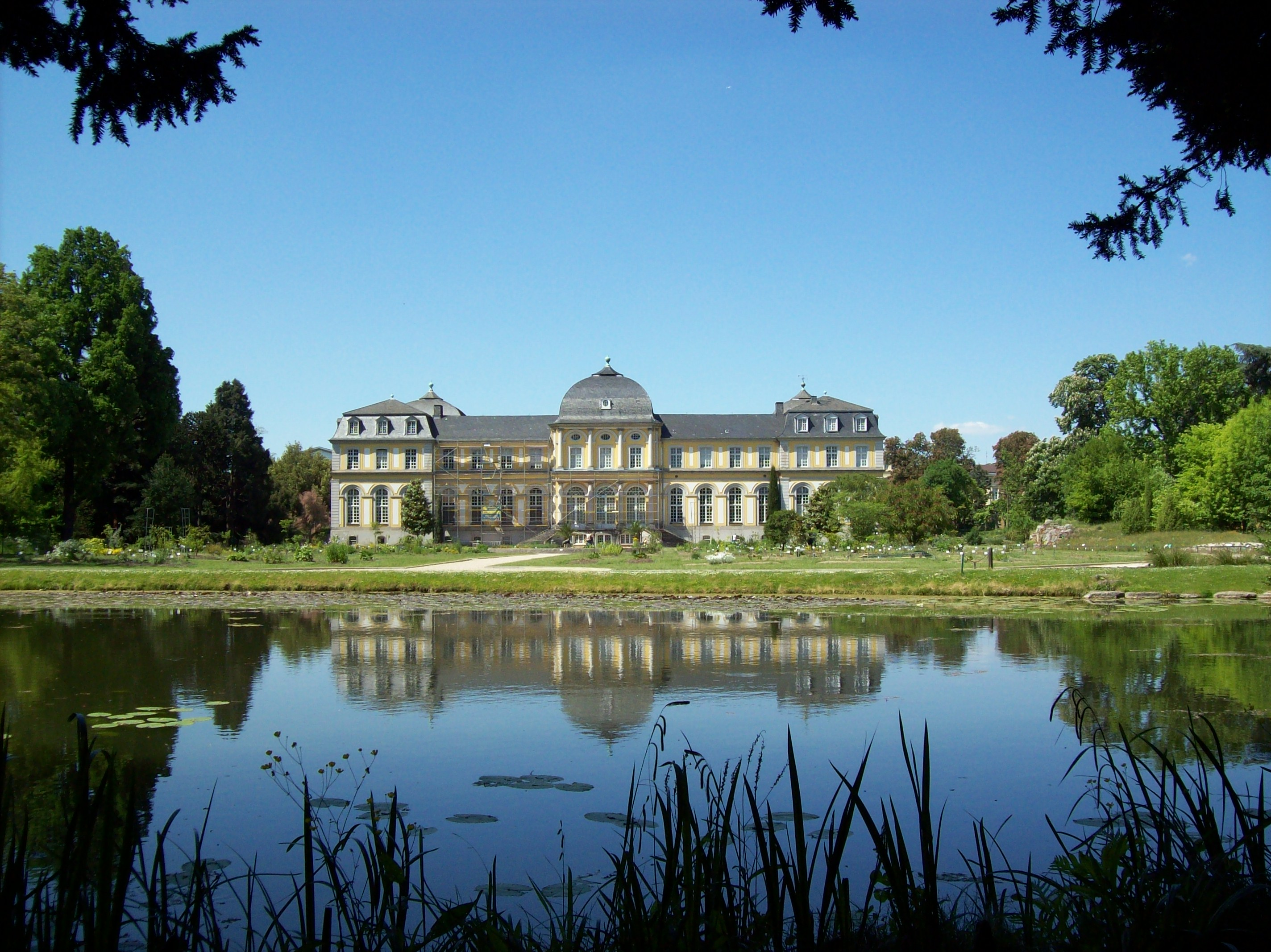
Poppelsdorf Palace, Bonn

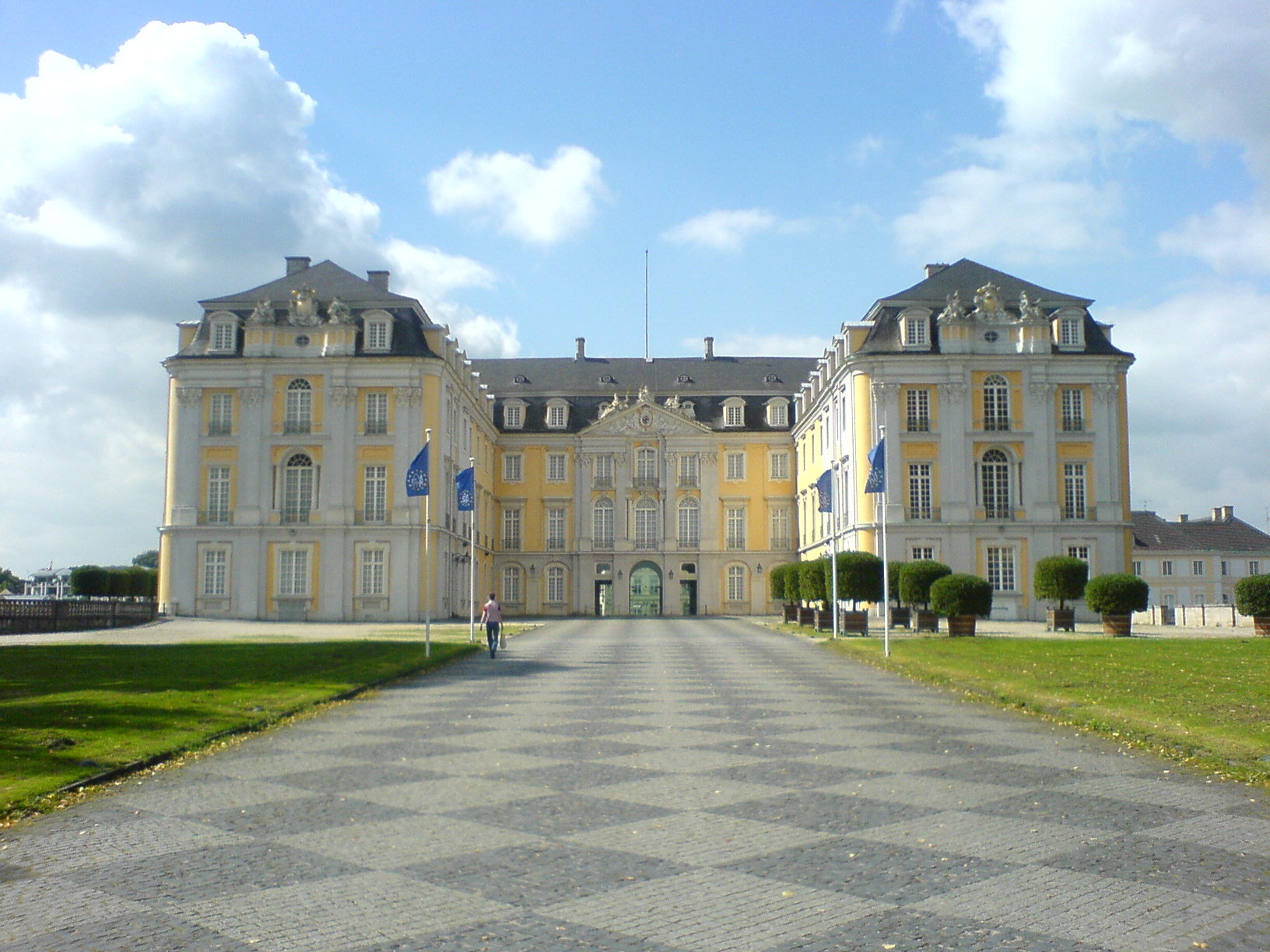
Augustusburg Palace, Brühl

== Coats of arms ==
A full armorial of the Wittelsbach family can be found on the French-language Wikipedia at Armorial of the House of Wittelsbach.

=== Origins ===
Armoiries
Écu
Nom et blasonnement

House of Scheyern

De gueules, à fasce vivrée d'argent. Cimier: un chapeau piramidal aux armes de l'ècu, retrousseré d'argent, sommé d'une plume d'autruche de même. (azure, a golden fess dancetty)

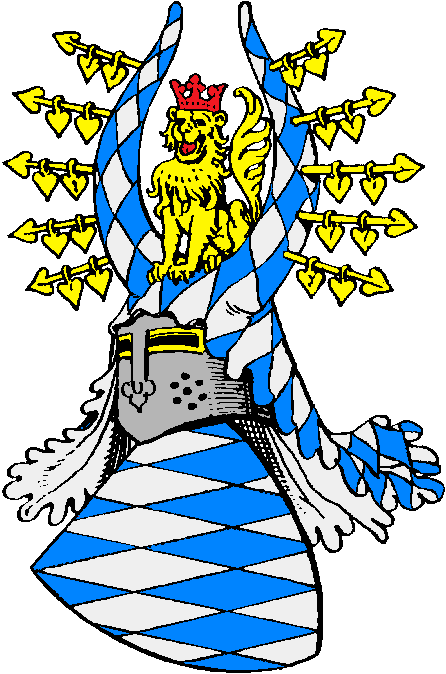
House of Wittelsbach The "strikingly simple and beautiful" arms of Wittelsbach were taken from the arms of the counts of Bogen, who became extinct in 1242. When Louis I married Ludmilla, the widow of Albert III, Count of Bogen, he adopted the coat of arms of the counts of Bogen together with their land, along the Danube between Regensburg and Deggendorf. The first members of the family to use the arms were that Louis I/Ludwig and Heinrich, who were the sons of first Wittelsbach Duke of Bavaria, Otto I. They used the arms in their seals around 1240. The arms have ever since been the arms of the family. The number of lozenges varied; from the 15th century 21 were used, increasing to 42 when Bavaria became a kingdom in 1806.

Fuselé en bande d'azur et d'argent.

Count Palatine of the Rhine from 1215.

de sable, au lion d'or, armé, lampassé et couronné de gueules et en 2 et 3 fuselé en bande d'azur et d'argent. The Count Palatine was also an Electoral Prince of the Empire, with the title of arch-seneschal of the Empire, as symbolized by : gueules à l'orbe d'or cerclée de même.

=== Grand Offices of the Prince Electors of the House of Wittelsbach (Erzämter) ===
Each of the prince electors carried one of the grand offices of the Empire. Each office was indicated by a heraldic mark; the ones that the House of Wittelsbach carried are shown below.

Office and titles	Mark of office	Holder	Blazon (of mark of office)
Arch-Senechal (Arch-Steward) of the Empire (Count Palatine of the Rhine from 1329 to 1623 and 1706 to 1714, plus Dukes of Bavaria from 1623 to 1706 and after 1714)			De gueules à l'orbe d'or.
Arch-treasurer of the Empire (Count Palatine of the Rhine from 1652 to 1706 and from 1714 to 1777, plus House of Hanover from 1710 to 1714 and after 1777)			De gueules à la couronne de Charlemagne d'or.

=== Palatinate branch (senior line), issue of Rudolph I of the Palatinate and Bavaria ===
In the German fashion, all the sons were "Count Palatine of the Rhine" (German: Pfalzgraf bei Rhein). There was only one Elector Palatine of the Rhine (German: Kurfürst von der Pfalz). Similarly, all the sons were Dukes of Bavaria (German: Herzog von Bayern), until 1506. Then, Duke in Bavaria (German: Herzog in Bayern) was the title used by all members of the House of Wittelsbach with the exception of the Duke of Bavaria. This became a unique position given to the eldest descendant of the younger branch of the Wittelsbachs, who inherited the rule of the entire duchy of Bavaria. For example, so reads the full title of the late 16th century's Charles I, Count Palatine of Zweibrücken-Birkenfeld and patriarch of the House of Palatinate-Birkenfeld: "Count Palatine by Rhine, Duke in Bavaria, Count at Veldenz and Sponheim" (Pfalzgraf bei Rhein, Herzog in Bayern, Graf zu Veldenz und Sponheim).

Figure	Name of armiger and blazon
	Electoral Palatinate, County Palatine of the Rhine from 1215 to 1623. Quarterly 1 and 4 sable, a lion or, armed, langued and crowned gules, 2 and 3 fusilly bendwise azure and argent. Heraldic augmentation for the Count Palatine of the Rhine, a prince-elector of the Holy Roman Empire: Quarterly 1 and 4 sable, a lion or, armed, langued and crowned gules, 2 and 3 fusilly bendwise azure and argent, overall gules, an orb or encircled of the same.
	Electoral Palatinate, County Palatine of the Rhine from 1215 to 1623. Coat of arms (15th century), the Wittelsbach (Bogen) lozenges quartered with the lion of the Palatinate.
	Rupert of Germany (1352 † 1410), king of the Romans from 1400 to 1410. Or, an eagle sable, membered, beaked and langued gules; overall quarterly 1 and 4 sable, a lion or, armed, langued and crowned gules, 2 and 3 fusilly bendwise azure and argent.
	Christopher of Bavaria (1416 † 1448), king of Denmark, Norway and Sweden Quarterly a cross paty argent, fimbriated gules, cantonned 1 and 4, azure three bars wavy argent, overall a lion crowned or, which is Sweden ancien, 2 and 3 fusilly bendwise argent and azure, which is Bavaria. Overall quarterly 1 or, nine hearts gules in three pallets, three lions passant guardant azure in pale, armed and langued gules, crowned of the field, brochant sur-le-tout, which is Denmark, 2 azure, three crowns or, which is Sweden moderne, 3 gules, a lion crowned or, holding in his paws a battle-axe argent, the handle of the second, which is Norway ancien and 4 gules, a dragon or, which is for the Kingdom of the Vandals
	Stephen, Count Palatine of Simmern-Zweibrücken (1385 † 1459), Count Palatine of Simmern-Zweibrücken Quarterly 1 and 4 sable, a lion or, armed, langued and crowned gules (Palatinate), 2 and 3 fusilly bendwise azure and argent (Bavaria), overall an inescutcheon Chequy or and azure (Simmern)
	Counts Palatine of Veldenz Quarterly 1 and 4 sable, a lion or, armed, langued and crowned gules (Palatinate), 2 and 3 fusilly bendwise azure and argent (Bavaria), overall an inescutcheon d'argent a lion d'azur, with a couronné d'or
	Counts of Palatinate–Birkenfeld (1584–1717) Quarterly 1 sable, a lion or, armed, langued and crowned gules (Palatinate), 2 fusilly bendwise azure and argent (Bavaria), 3 a lion azure crowned or (Veldenz), 4 Chequy gules and azure (Birkenfeld).
	Frederick V, Elector Palatine (1596 † 1632), elector palatine from 1610 to 1623 and king of Bohemia from 1619 to 1620. Quarterly of six, three rows of two, 1 gules, a lion argent, queue fourchée in saltire, crowned, armed and langued or (Bohemia), 2 azure, an eagle chequy of argent and gules, beaked, langued, membered and crowned or (Moravia), 3 or, an eagle sable, armed, beaked and langued gules, on its heart a crescent below a cross argent (Silesia), 4 barry of six argent and azure, a lion gules, queue fourchée in saltire, armed, langued and crowned or (Luxembourg), 5 per fess embattled azure and or (Upper Lusace), 6 argent, a bull gules issuant from a terrace vert (Lower Lusace). Overall per pale sable, a lion or, armed, langued and crowned gules (Palatinate) and fusilly bendwise azure and argent (Bavaria); grafted in point gules, an orb or, which is the heraldic augmentation for the archsteward of the Holy Roman Empire.
	Counts Palatine of the Rhine from 1648 to 1688. Quarterly 1 and 4 sable, a lion or, armed, langued and crowned gules (Palatinate), 2 and 3 fusilly bendwise azure and argent (Bavaria), overall gules, a crown of Charlemagne or, which is the heraldic augmentation for the archtreasurer of the Holy Roman Empire.
	Counts palatine of Neuburg from 1574 to 1688. Counts palatine of Sulzbach from 1688 to 1795. Quarterly of eight, two rows of four, 1 fusilly bendwise azure and argent (Bavaria), 2 or, a lion sable, armed and langued gules (Juliers), 3 gules, an escutcheon argent surmounted by an escarbuncle with rays or (Cleves), 4 argent, a lion gules, queue fourchée in saltire, armed, langued and crowned or (Berg), 5 argent, a lion azure armed, langued and crowned or (Veldenz), 6 or, a fess chequy argent and gules of three rows (de la Marck), 7 argent, three chevrons gules (Ravensberg), 8 argent, a fess sable. Overall, a lion or, armed, langued and crowned gules (County palatine of the Rhine).
	Electors palatine of Neuburg from 1688 to 1742. Per pale, I quarterly 1 sable, a lion or, armed, langued and crowned gules (county palatine of the Rhine), 2 fusilly bendwise azure and argent (Bavaria), 3 argent, a lion azure armed, langued and crowned or (Veldenz), 4 or, a fess chequy of three rows argent and gules (de la Marck), II per fess, the chief tierced in pale, the base per pale: 1, or, a lion sable, armed and langued gules (Juliers), 2 gules, an escutcheon argent, surmounted by an escarbuncle with rays or (Cleves), 3 argent, a lion gules, queue fourchée in saltire, armed, langued and crowned or (Berg); 4 argent, three chevrons gules (Ravensberg), 5 argent, a fess sable. Overall gules, a crown of Charlemagne or (Arch-treasurer of the Holy Roman Empire).
	Counts palatine of Zweibrücken from 1569 to 1675 Palatine Zweibrücken Per pale, I quarterly 1 and 4 sable, a lion or, armed, langued and crowned gules (county palatine of the Rhine), 2 and 3 fusilly bendwise, azure and argent (Bavaria); overall argent, a lion azure armed, langued and crowned or (Veldenz); II quarterly of six, two rows of three, 1 or, a lion sable, armed and langued gules (Juliers), 2 gules, an escutcheon argent, surmounted by an escarbuncle with rays or (Cleves), 3 argent, a lion gules, queue fourchée in saltire, armed, langued and crowned or (Berg), 4 or, a fess chequy of three rows, argent and gules (de la Marck), 5 argent, three chevrons gules (Ravensberg), 6 argent, a fess sable.
	Electorate of Bavaria under Charles Theodore, Elector of Bavaria, 1777–1799: 1. duchy of Cleve, 2. duchy of Jülich, 3. duchy of Berg, 4. principality of Moers, 5. heart, 6. markgraviat of Bergen op Zoom, 7. county of Mark, 8a. county of Veldenz, 8b. county of Sponheim, 9. county of Ravensberg, heart: duchy of Bavaria and Palatinate, electorate.
	Electorate of Bavaria under Maximilian I Joseph of Bavaria, 1799–1804 Grand quarters 1: Or a lion Sable with a forked tail in saltire armed and langued Gules, crowned Or (which is from Juliers) in 2, Argent a lion Gules, a forked tail in saltire, armed, langued and crowned Azure (which is of Berg), in 3, Gules, an escutcheon Argent, carbuncle rays Or, debruising over all (which is of Cleves), in 4, Or a fess Sable (which of the County of Sponheim), in 5, checky Argent and Gules of three tires (which is of Birkenfeld), in 6 Gules, three mountain Vert charged of three silver crosses in saltire (which is from Bergen op Zoom), in 7, Argent with a lion Azure crowned Or (which is from the County of Veldenz, in 8, Or, a fess checkered argent and gules of three tires (which is from la Marck), in 9, argent, three coats of arms gules (2 and 1) (which is from Ribeaupierre), in 10, argent, three chevrons gules (which is from Ravensberg), in 11, argent three-headed eagle sable crowned or 2 and 1 (which is from the Principality of Waldeck-Pyrmont, over all, quarterly in 1 and 4 Sable, a lion Or, armed and langued and crowned Gules (which is of the County Palatine of the Rhine) and 2 and 3 tapering in bend Azure and Argent (which is of Bavaria), on the all from gules to orb d'or.;.;
	Electorate of Bavaria under Maximilian I Joseph of Bavaria, 1804–1806 Per pale in 1: Azure, to the penon quarterly Argent and Gules, the shaft Or and Argent and Gules of three pieces (which is of the Bishopric of Würzburg), in 2, Argent a lion Gules, the forked tail in saltire, armed, langued and crowned Azure (which is of Berg), in 3, Gules, an escutcheon Argent, carbuncle rays Or, debruising over the whole (which is of Cleves), in 4, Or a lion Sable armed and langued Gules a stick Argent debruising over the whole (which is of the Archdiocese of Bamberg), in 5, parti gules and argent (which is of the abbey of Augsburg, in 6, per fess gules and azure on the head of a princess crowned or (which is of the abbey of Kempten, in 7, d argent a Moor's head neck and earring Gules, crowned Or (which is of Freising Abbey), in 8, argent a wolf Gules (which is of the Abbey of Passau), in 9, Argent a fess Azure (which is of Leuchtenberg), in 10, Per fess in 1 Gules an elephant Argent and in 2 Or (which is of County Helfenstein ), 11, argent, three chevrons gules (which is Ravensberg), 12, argent a mounting three peaks vert surmounted by a lion gules armed and langued also gules (which is of Mindeheim), 13, Or, a fess chequered Argent and Gules of three rows (which is of the Marck), 14, Gules a half-headed eagle Argent (which is of Ottobeuren Abbey ), 15, Argent to the castle with two towers Gules (which is of Rothenburg), over all, quarterly in 1 and 4 Sable, to the lion Or, armed and langued and crowned Gules (which is of County Palatine of the Rhine) and in 2 and 3 tapered in bend Azure and Argent (which is of Bavaria), over all Gules an orb Or..
	Kings of Sweden from 1654 to 1720 (from the Counts Palatine of Zweibrücken-Kleeburg a sub-cadet branch of the Counts Palatine of Zweibrücken) Quarterly, a cross paty or, which is the cross of Saint Eric, cantonned 1 and 4, azure, three crowns or, two and one (Sweden moderne), 2 and 3 azure, three bars wavy argent, a lion crowned or, armed and langued gules (Sweden ancien). Overall quarterly Bavaria, Juliers, Cleves and Berg, inescutcheon sable, a lion or, armed, langued and crowned gules (County palatine of the Rhine).
	Counts palatine of Birkenfeld from 1569 to 1795. Per pale, I quarterly 1 and 4 County palatine of the Rhine, 2 and 3 Bavaria; II quarterly 1 Veldenz, 2 chequy gules and argent (de Birkenfeld), 3 argent, three escutcheons gules, two and one (Rappolstein), 4 argent, three heads of eagles sable, crowned or, two and one (de Hohenach).
	King of Bavaria from 1809 to 1835. Fusilly bendwise, azure and argent, an inescutcheon gules, a sword argent pommelled or and a scepter or in saltire, in chief a royal crown or
	Kings of Bavaria from 1835 to 1918 (see Coat of arms of Bavaria). Quarterly 1 sable, a lion or, armed, langued and crowned gules (County palatine of the Rhine), 2 per fess indented gules and argent (the "Franconian Rake") for the northern parts of Bavaria that were part of the stem duchy of Franconia, 3 bendy sinister argent and gules, a pale or (markgraviate of Burgau representing those lands that were part of the stem duchy of Swabia), 4 argent, a lion azure, armed, langued and crowned or (Veldenz) representing the lands on the middle Rhenish Palatinate were this branch of the Wittelsbachs originated. Overall, Bavaria.
	Otto de Wittelsbach (1815 † 1867), king of Greece. Azure, a cross couped argent, inescutcheon Bavaria.
	Dukes in Bavaria after 1834. Paly-bendy azure and argent.
	Prince Ferdinand of Bavaria (1884–1958), Infante of Spain; Branch of Wittelsbach-Bourbon Quarterly, County Palatine of the Rhine, Franconia, de Burgovie, de Veldenz. Inescutcheon, Bavaria. In chief, gules, a cross argent.

=== Bavarian branch (junior branch), issue of Louis of Bavaria, extinct by 1777 ===
Figure	Name of armiger and blazon
	Dukes of Bavaria from 1180 to 1623. Fusilly in bend azure and argent
	Louis IV (1286 † 1347), king of the Romans in 1314, emperor of the Holy Roman Empire in 1328. Or, an eagle sable, membered, beaked and langued gules, inescutcheon fusilly in bend azure and argent.
	Dukes of Bavaria and Electors of Brandenburg : Louis V († 1361), Louis VI († 1365) and Otto V († 1379). Per pale fusilly in bend azure and argent, and argent, an eagle gules, armed, beaked and langued or.
	Duke of Bavaria-Straubing, Counts of Hainaut and Holland from 1254 to 1433. Quarterly 1 and 4, fusilly in bend, azure and argent, 2 and 3, grand-quarterly I and IV or, a lion sable, armed and langued gules, II and III, or, a lion gules, armed and langued azure.
	Electors of Bavaria from 1623 to 1777. In 1620, the Elector Palatine Frederick V, a Protestant, was defeated after trying to take the kingdom of Bohemia. He was placed under the ban of the Empire and his lands, titles and electoral dignity were confiscated and given to his Roman Catholic cousin, the Duke of Bavaria, who takes: Quarterly 1 and 4 fusilly in bend, azure and argent, 2 and 3 sable, a lion or, armed, langued and crowned gules, overall gules, an orb crucifer or.
	Charles VII (1697 † 1745), Holy Roman Emperor from 1742 to 1745. Or, an eagle sable, membered, beaked and langued gules; inescutcheon quarterly 1 and 4 fusilly in bend, azure and argent, 2 and 3 sable, a lion or, armed, langued and crowned gules, sur le tout gules, an orb crucifer or.

== See also ==
- Asteroid 90712 Wittelsbach, named in the castle and dynasty's honour
- Kings of Germany family tree
- List of coats of arms with the Palatine Lion
- List of rulers of Bavaria
- List of rulers of the Palatinate
- Monarchism in Bavaria after 1918
- Wittelsbach Diamond

== Notes ==
Royal House House of Wittelsbach
Preceded by House of Luxembourg	Ruling House of the Holy Roman Empire; 1328–1347	Succeeded by House of Luxembourg
Preceded by House of Habsburg	Ruling House of the Holy Roman Empire; 1742–1745	Succeeded by House of Lorraine
Preceded by House of Přemyslid	Ruling House of Hungary; 1305–1307	Succeeded by House of Anjou
Preceded by New title	Ruling House of Greece; 1831–1863	Succeeded by House of Glücksburg
Preceded by House of Welf	Ruling House of Bavaria; 1180–1918	Monarchy Abolished
