= History of Istria =

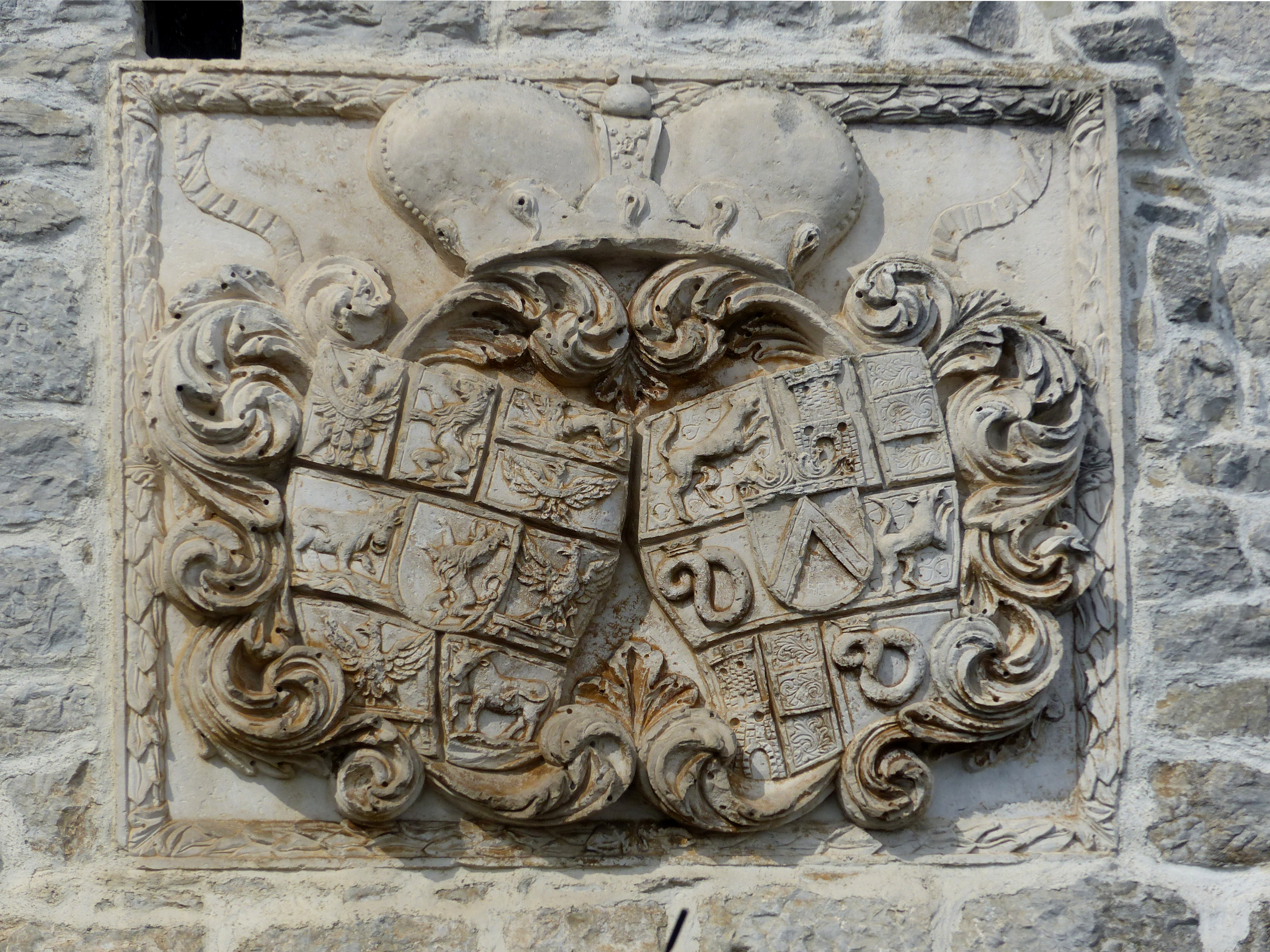
Old coat of arms on the wall of Pazin Castle, central Istria

Istria (Croatian and Slovene: Istra; Istriot: Eîstria; Istro-Romanian, Italian and Venetian: Istria, Latin: Histria) is the largest peninsula in the Adriatic Sea. The peninsula is located at the head of the Adriatic between the Gulf of Trieste and the Bay of Kvarner. It is shared by three countries: Croatia, Slovenia, and Italy.

== Prehistory ==
The first known appearance of human life in Istria dates to Lower Paleolithic, as evidenced by artifacts found in Šandalja Cave near Pula, dated to 800,000 BC.

Since the 11th century BC, Istria was inhabited by the Histri, a prehistoric Illyrian tribe after whom Istria was named. Their arrival marks the beginning of the Iron Age in Istria. Another Illyrian tribe that inhabited the area were the Liburnians. The westernmost extents of their land, Liburnia, covered the area east of the Raša River.

== Roman Istria ==
Regio X Venetia et Histria of Roman Italy

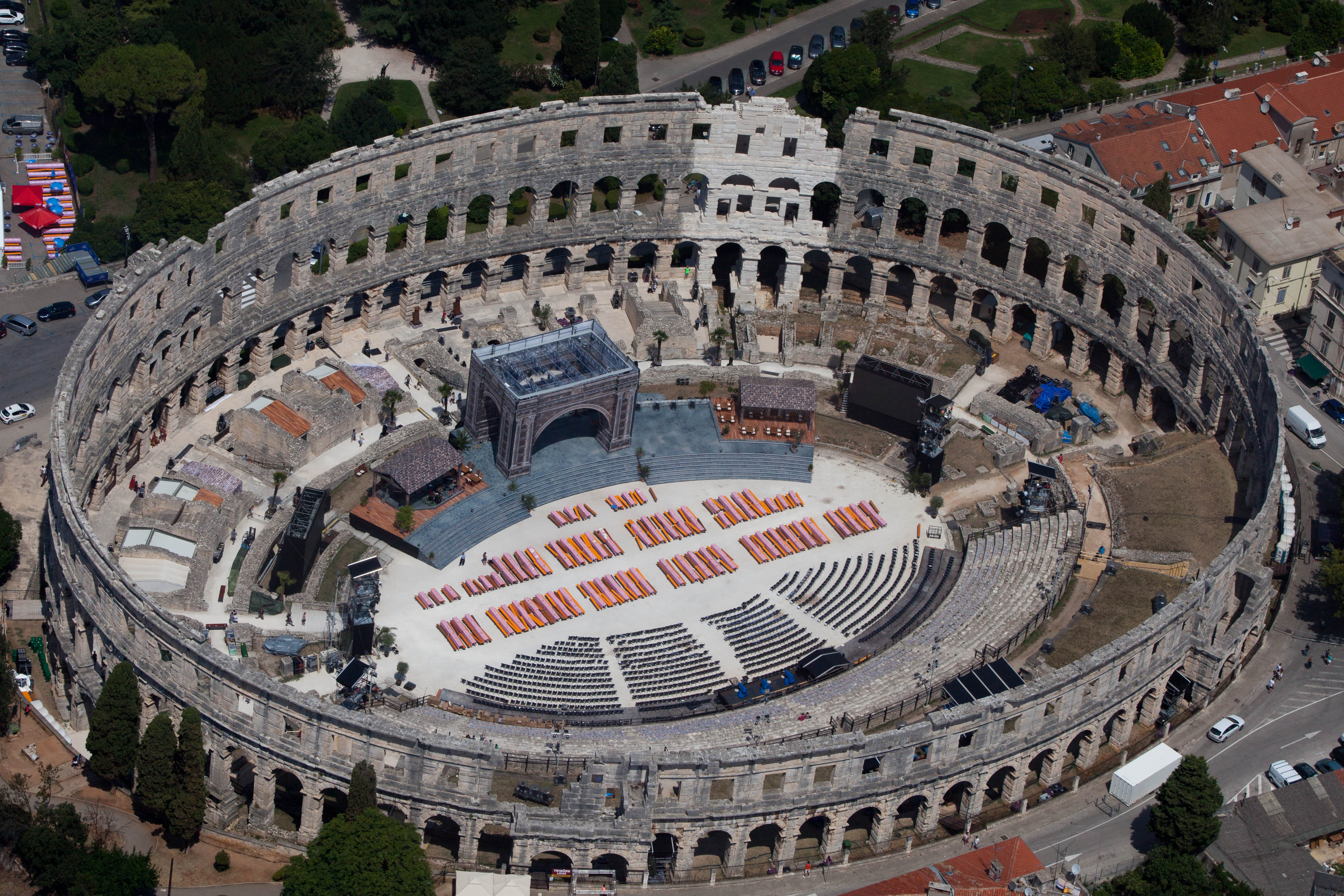
Pula Arena, built in 27 BC – 68 AD, is among the six largest surviving Roman amphitheatres in the world.

After a series of conflicts, the Romans conquered the Histri and took control of the Istria peninsula in 178 and 177 BC. Romans established the port of Pietas Iulia (modern Pula) and gradually converting the inland areas into latifundia, large estates worked by colonists and locals. Although pockets of Illyrian resistance remained in the hilly interior, they succumbed in time to the Romans’ combination of military and economic superiority. Although Pula is Istria's only settlement to preserve significant evidence of the Romans (principally its Forum and Amphitheater), most of Istria's major settlements were established in this period. Under Emperor Augustus, Istria was incorporated into the region of Venetia et Histria, as part of the Roman mainland of Italia. It remained under Roman rule until the fall of the Western Roman Empire in 476.

Christianity appeared in Istria in the late 3rd century AD, and the first churches were built in the 4th century. The period between the 2nd and 5th century AD saw the incursions of Germanic tribes, a sustained influx of refugees from Pannonia and other provinces, political instability amid infighting for the Roman throne, and decline of the economy.

Following the fall of the Western Roman Empire (476), the region was ruled by Odoacer, and later conquered by the Ostrogoths in 489 AD.

== Byzantine Istria ==
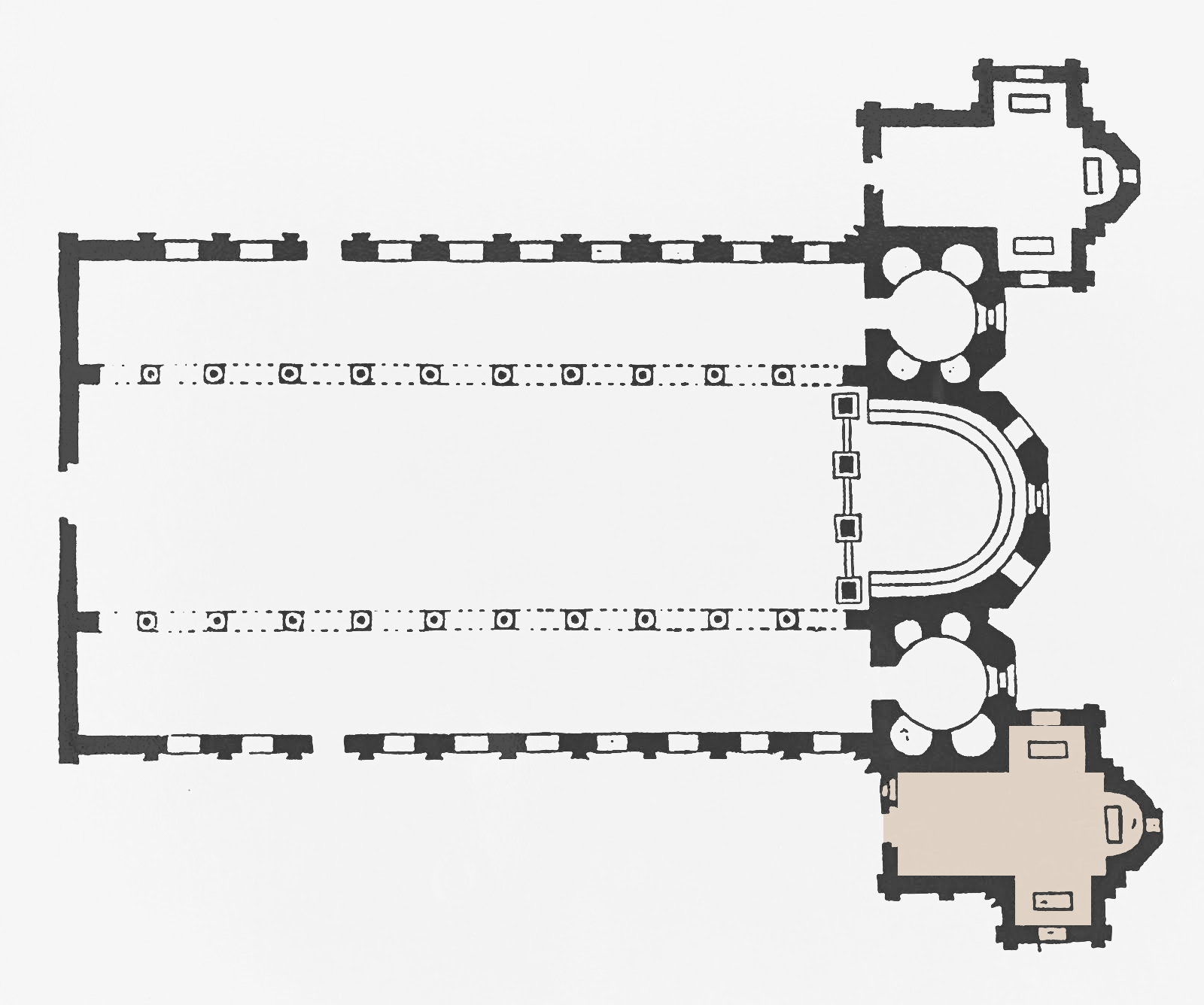
Plan of the 6th century Byzantine Basilica of Santa Maria del Canneto, in Pula (Croatia)

In 538/539, Istria was incorporated into the Byzantine Empire, and consequently placed under administrative and military jurisdiction of the Exarchate of Ravenna. Local administration in Istria was headed by provincial magister militum. After the Lombard invasion of Italy (568), Istria was exposed to several Lombard attacks during the next two centuries, but remained under Byzantine rule. During that period, it enjoyed substantial provincial self-governance, because of its peripheral position. After the fall of the Exarchate in 751, Istria remained under Byzantine rule until 788, when it was conquered by the Frankish kingdom.

During the Byzantine period, significant changes emerged at eastern borders of Istria. In 599, first attacks of Avars and Slavs on Istrian borders were recorded. At the beginning of the 7th century, Istrian eastern and inland regions were invaded by Slavs, while the coastal area resisted these attacks. This period was highly contentious, because of Lombard attacks from the West, Slovene attacks from the north, and Croat attacks from the east, resulting in a state of near constant conflict, particularly between Byzantine-held littoral and Slavic inhabitants in inland regions.

== Avaro-Slavic invasions and settlement ==
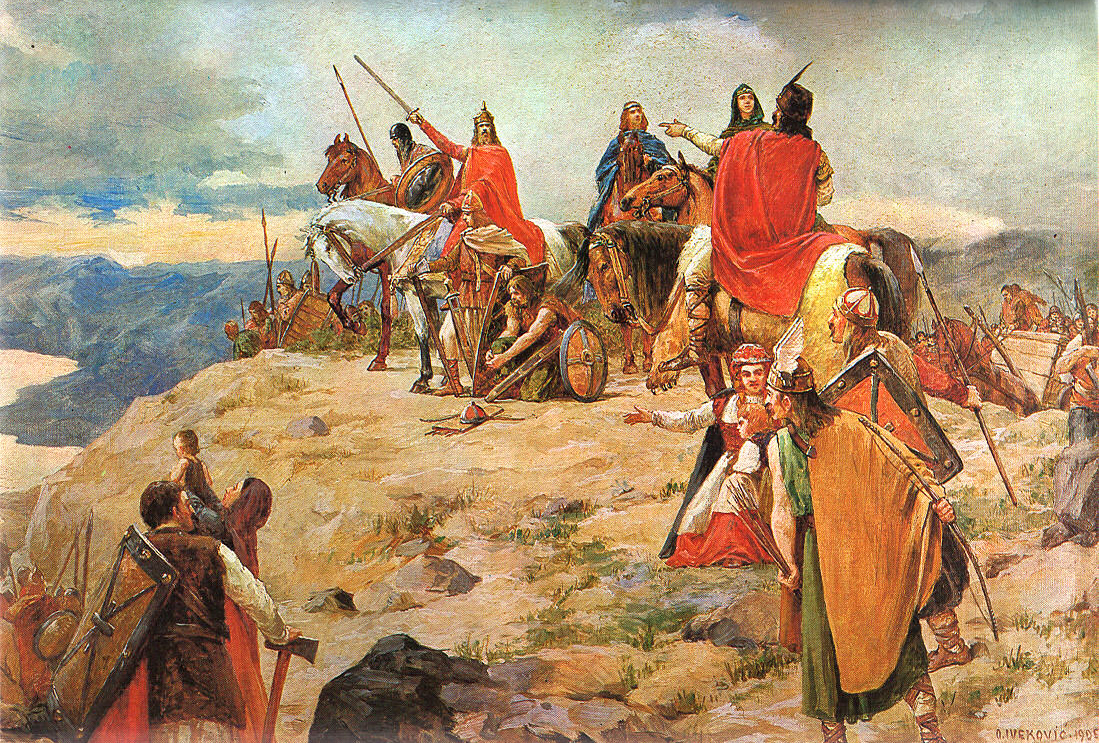
Oton Iveković, The Croats' arrival at the Adriatic Sea

In 599, the first Avaro-Slavic invasion of Istria was recorded. This invasion chiefly involved the hinterland, but possibly threatened the coast as well, triggering a response from Ravenna. In the following year (600) the Avars and Slavs invaded Italy after passing through Istrian territory. The locals probably retired in the walled cities, leaving the main routes unguarded. Around 600 to 602, the Avars and the Slavs, perhaps instigated by the Lombards, penetrated into Istria, devastating it all with fire and rapine. In 611, the Avars and Slavs pillaged Friuli before attacking Istria again. On this occasion, they inflicted what might have been the worst defeat for the locals. Some ancient historians and reporters, such as Gregorius Anicius, later Pope Gregory the Great, unaware of the importance of the Avars in the Balkans, used the terms Slavs, or Sclavenes, in connection to Istria and the other Balkanic zones, to refer to the Avars and/or the Avaro-Slavic hordes. Gisulf, Duke of Friuli (c. 590-c. 610), who died during an Avar invasion of Istria, is thought to have conducted raids against the Avars and the Slavs in Istria, perhaps after making a deal with the Byzantines. In 619, the Avar khagan allegedly made a deal with Emperor Heraclius for the settlement of Slavs in northern Istria. The mission of an abbot Martin sent by Pope John IV to "travel the length of Dalmatia and Istria with large sums of money for the redemption of captives held by pagans" in 640–642, indicates that by that time the Slavs had settled in the region.

Fianona (Plomin) was completely destroyed by the Avars in their early invasions of the 7th century, and was rebuilt as late as the 11th century, having disappeared from the records. Among the other cities destroyed by the Avars and Slavs is Gallignana (Gračišće), which ceased to be a castrum, and Nesactium. The basilica of Vrsar was probably burned during one of the Avaro-Slavic invasions, and it has been suggested that also the church of St Fusca (Sveta Foška) near Žminj (Gimino) suffered the same fate by the same hands. Several other settlements disappeared with these incursions, possibly including the still unidentified Mutila, Faveria and Cissa, mentioned by Pliny, which utterly disappeared from history.

Traces of early Slavic settlement in Istria, and of the Slavic raids, are scarce. Some Avar findings were discovered in Istria, such as two Avar three-winged arrows, found in Nesactium, a belt harness found in Novigrad (Cittanova), and a belt plaque found near Nesactium (near Valtura, in eastern Istria). While historians consider it unlikely, ancient records don't exclude the possibility that, besides Slavs, Avars lived in Istria, as Constantine VII claimed that a minority ethnic group, recognized as Avars, lived in his time in the Kingdom of Croatia, which included eastern Istria. (Note: In chapter 30 of De Administrando Imperio, Constantine VII claims that Dalmatia extended up to the mounts of Istria. He further claims that the Kingdom of Croatia stretched from the river Cetina to the city of Labin, and that the Croats took possession of this land from the Avars. Constantine states that in his time, that is around 950, some descendants of the Avars, recognized as such, still lived in the Kingdom of Croatia, which, as mentioned, included eastern Istria. However, he does not specify their exact location within Croatia.) While Avars may have been active and even controlled regions in present-day Croatia and Slovenia, they are thought to have only lived in Pannonia (present-day Hungary), as this is the only place where Avar burials have been found.

After the Avaro-Slavic defeat at the siege of Constantinople in 612, the Slavs might've split from their Avar masters and settled into Byzantine territory. According to Gianni Oliva, following the Barbarian invasions of the 6th century, in Istria there was a mixing of people, after which two distinct ethnic divisions emerged: the Italians, who derived from the preexisting Romans, and the Slavs, who derived from the intermixing of Croats and Avars. Some historians have argued that Istria was actually colonized by Carnolian Slavs, with August Dimitz reporting that this was the belief during his day. Indeed, according to one current theory, the first wave of Slavic-speaking settlers entered Istria in the late 6th century, but according to another theory, the Slavs entered first the Karst area, and then entered Istria from the north, above Trieste (in present-day Slovenia) in the 7th century.

== Frankish Istria ==
Istria was annexed to the Frankish kingdom by Pepin of Italy in 788–790, thus ending the Byzantine rule in the region. In 804, an assembly of Frankish authorities and local representatives was held, known as the Placitum of Riziano (sl. Rižana), resolving various issues regarding the administration in the region. During that period, the vast Carolingian Duchy of Friuli was encompassing various eastern regions, but in 828 it was divided into four counties, one of them being the County of Istria, remaining under the jurisdiction of Italian realm. In time, the seeds of Istria's dissolution were sown under increasingly weak Frankish rule, which enabled most settlements to achieve de facto autonomy.

== Venetian Istria ==
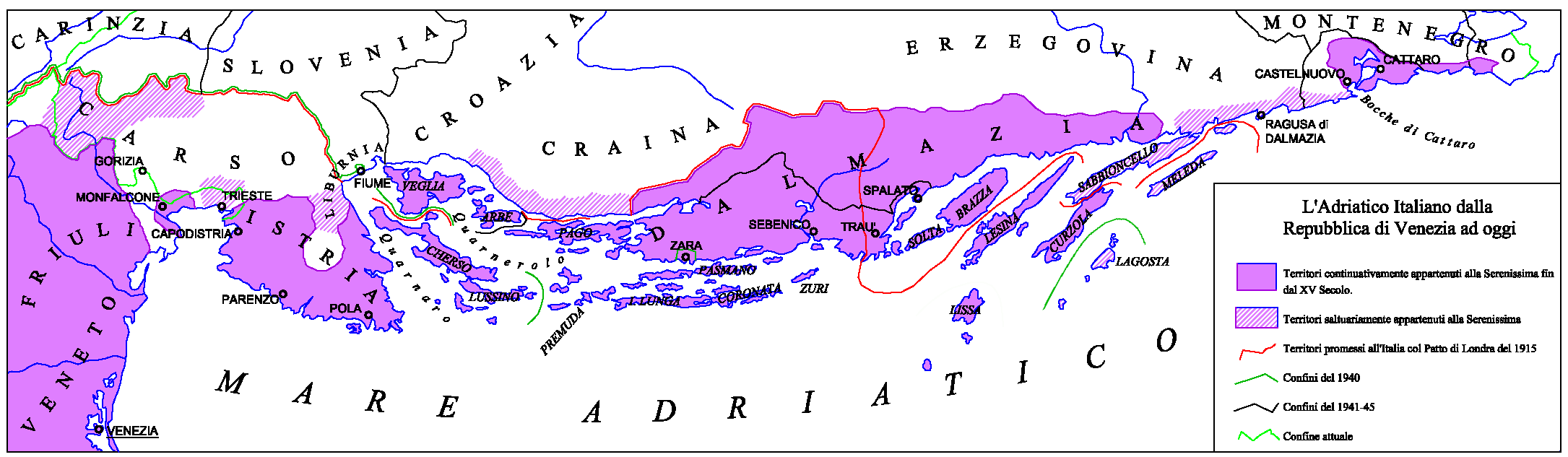
Map of Istria and Dalmatia with the ancient domains of the Republic of Venice (indicated in fuchsia. Dashed diagonally, the territories that belonged occasionally)

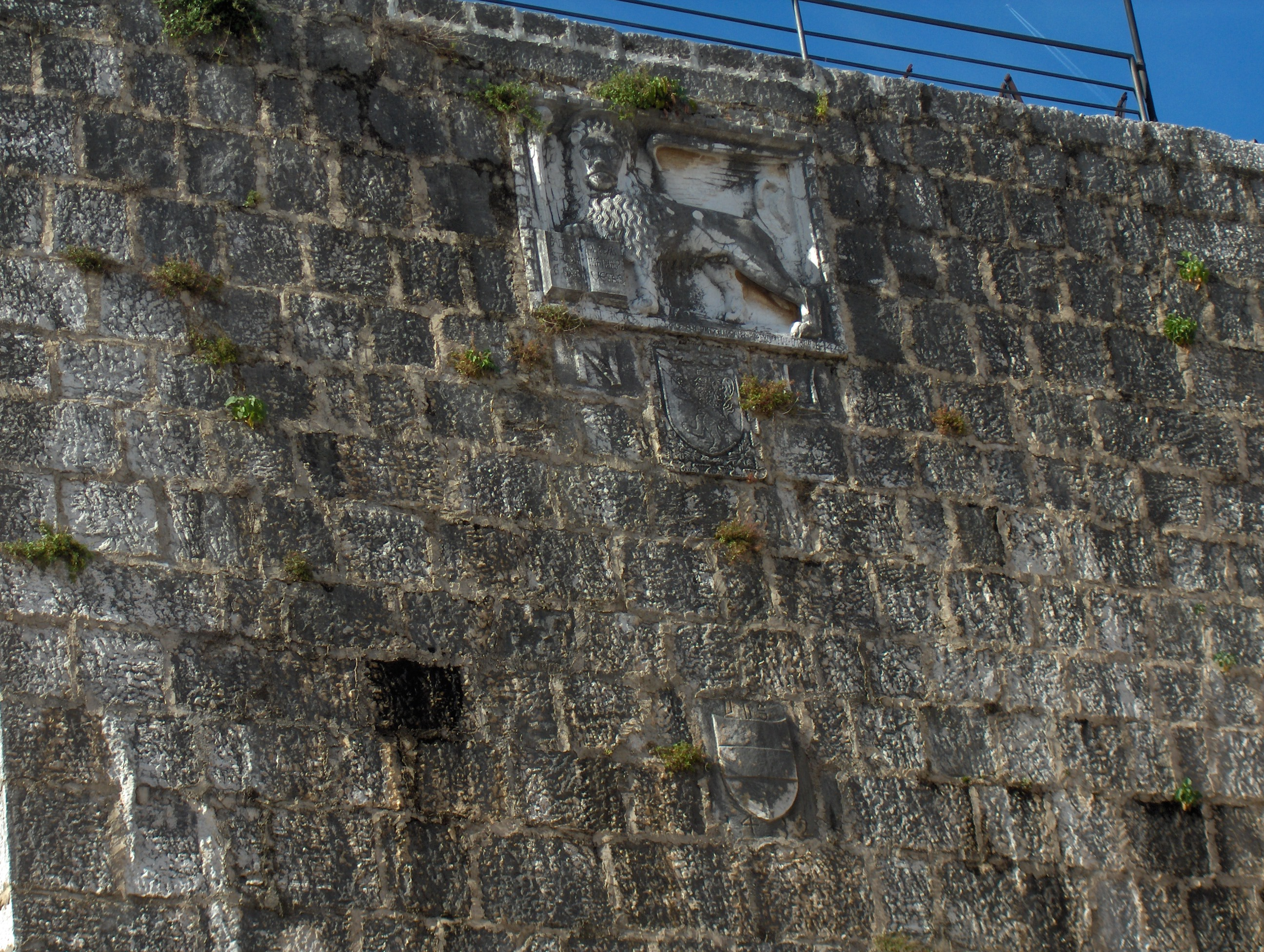
Venetian Lion of Saint Mark on the Pentagonal Tower of Poreč

Under Pietro II Candiano, who was Doge of Venice between 932 and 939, coastal cities of Istria signed a first act of devotion to the Venetian rule, thus initiating the process of gradual integration of Istrian coastal regions into the Venetan Stato da Màr. That process was long and challenging, since it was opposed by royal authorities, particularly after the restoration of the Holy Roman Empire in 962, and consequent placement of the Istrian county under jurisdiction of the newly created Duchy of Carinthia (976). Thus, two distinctive political influences were present in Istria: Venetian in coastal regions, and imperial in Istrian hinterland.

On Ascension Day in 1000 a powerful fleet sailed from Venice to resolve the problem of the Narentine pirates. The fleet visited all the main Istrian and Dalmatian cities, whose citizens, exhausted by the wars between the Croatian king Svetislav and his brother Cresimir, swore an oath of fidelity to Venice. In 1145, the cities of Pula, Koper and Izola rose against the Republic of Venice but were defeated, and were since further controlled by Venice. During the 13th century, the Patriarchate's rule weakened and the towns kept surrendering to Venice – Poreč in 1267, Umag in 1269, Novigrad in 1270, Sveti Lovreč in 1271, Motovun in 1278, Kopar in 1279, and Piran and Rovinj in 1283. Venice gradually dominated the whole coastal area of western Istria and the area to Plomin on the eastern part of the peninsula. The wealthier coastal towns cultivated increasingly strong economic relationships with Venice and by 1348 were eventually incorporated into its territory, while their inland counterparts fell under the sway of the Patriarchal State of Aquileia, and partially same under Habsburg possession in 1374.

On 15 February 1267, Parenzo was formally incorporated with the Venetian state. Other coastal towns followed shortly thereafter. Bajamonte Tiepolo was sent away from Venice in 1310, to start a new life in Istria after his downfall. A description of the 16th-century Istria with a precise map was prepared by the Italian geographer Pietro Coppo. A copy of the map inscribed in stone can now be seen in the Pietro Coppo Park in the center of the town of Izola in southwestern Slovenia.

During the history of the coexistence of Slavic and Roman communities in Istria, the Slavs mostly lived in the interior, while the coast was Roman.

== Holy Roman Empire and the Habsburg monarchy ==
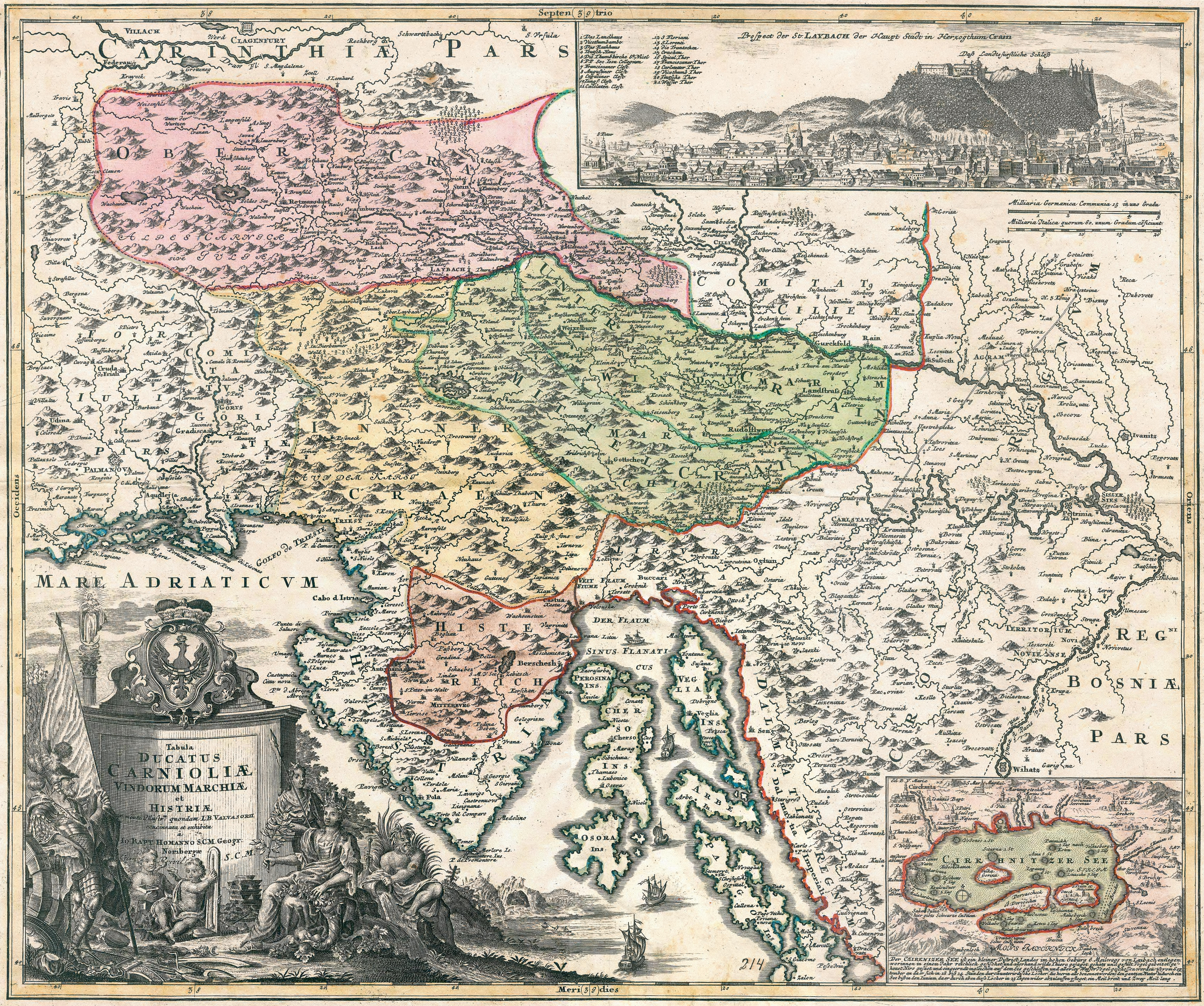
A 1714 map of the Duchy of Carniola by Johann Homann shows an adjacent Histereich or Istrian march in orange.

In spite of Venetian expansion in coastal regions of Istria, the hinterand remained under rule of the Holy Roman Empire. Since 962, emperors were appointing various feudal lords as governors in the County of Istria, and consequently granted the title of the Margraves of Istria to the Patriarchs of Aquileia. In 1180, the long-standing disputes between patriarchates of Aquileia and Grado over jurisdiction in Istria were resolved by mutual agreement, in favor of Aquileia.

The inner Istrian part around the town of Pazin (German: Mitterburg), named Pazin County (Croatian: Pazinska knežija or Pazinska grofovija), with its stronghold Pazin Castle, was part of the Holy Roman Empire. It was held by the Counts of Gorizia after the 1100s, and was passed to the House of Habsburg in 1365.

The Venetian part of the peninsula passed to the Habsburg monarchy in 1797, by the Treaty of Leoben and the Treaty of Campo Formio.

== Napoleonic era ==
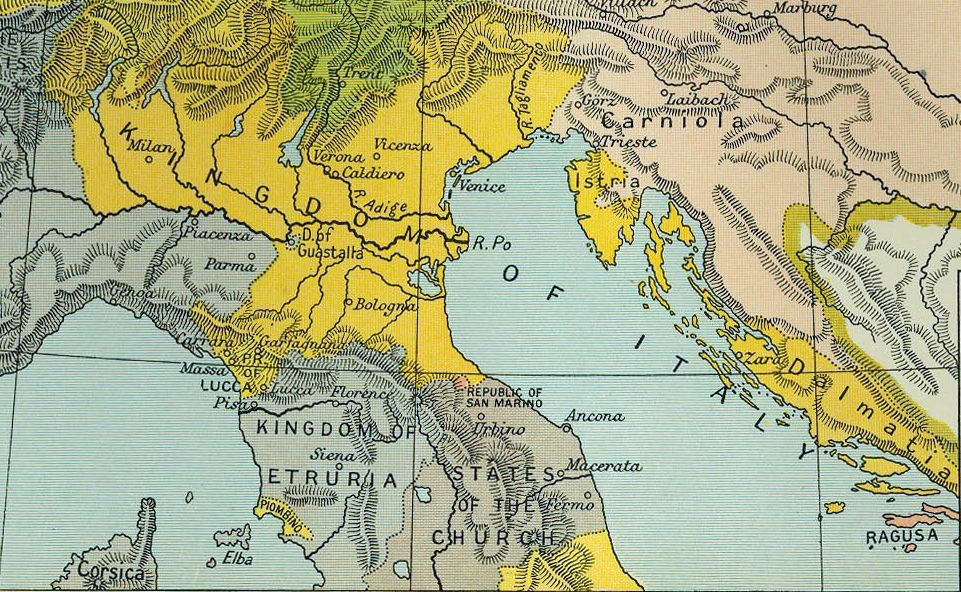
The Napoleonic Kingdom of Italy from 1806 to 1810 included Istria that had belonged to Venice until 1797

Following the fall of the Venetian Republic (1797), Istria was occupied by Napoleon; however, he gave Venice and the Venetian part of Istria and Dalmatia to Austria, in exchange for the Netherlands and Lombardia.

In 1805, Napoleon re-occupied the former Venetian Istria. The Holy Roman Empire ended with the period of Napoleonic rule from 1805 to 1813, when Istria became part of the Italian Kingdom and, from 1809, of the Illyrian provinces of the Napoleonic Empire. For the first time, inner and eastern parts of Istria became a part of Croatia, as a part of Civil Croatia, established by Napoleon.

From the Middle Ages to the 19th century, Italian and Slavic communities in Istria had lived peacefully side by side because they did not know the national identification, given that they generically defined themselves as "Istrians", of "Romance" or "Slavic" culture.

== Austrian period ==
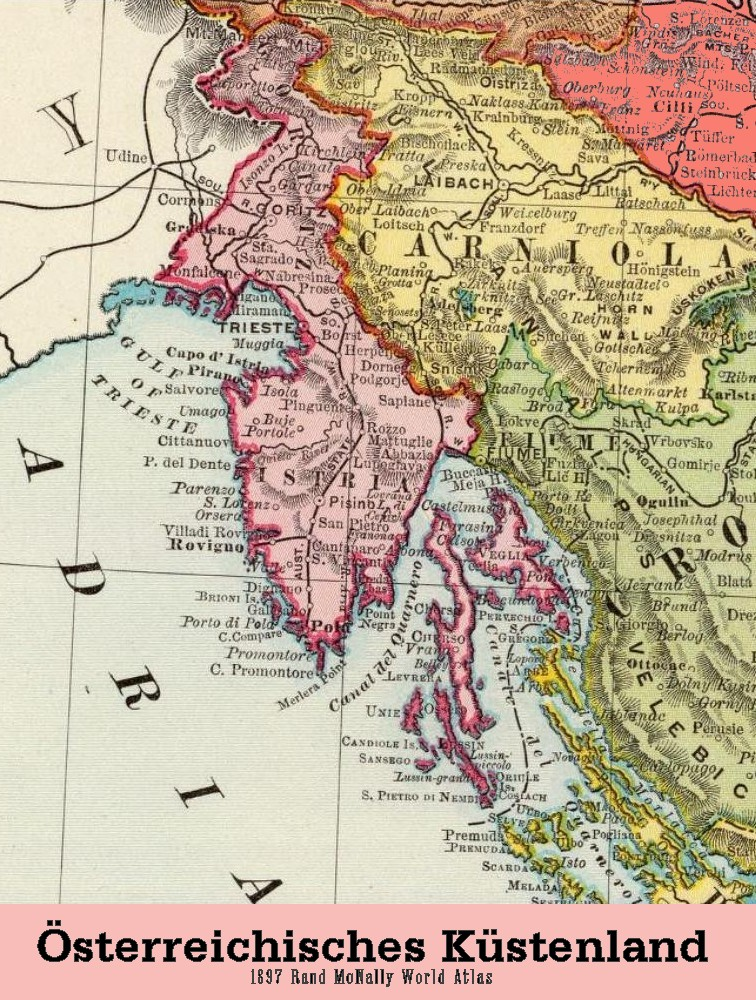
Istria as part of Austrian Littoral in the 19th century

After this short period, the newly established Austrian Empire ruled entire Istrian territory from 1814 until 1918. Istria became the part of the Empire as a separate territorial unit, with Trieste as its capital. Pazin became its capital in 1825. In 1866 Pula became the capital port of the Austrian Empire Navy.

The introduction of limited democracy in 1861, by means of a regional parliament (Diet of Istria) that convened at Parenzo (Poreč), only served to its purpose to the Austrians in defusing Italian calls for the region's union with the newly established Kingdom of Italy, as suffrage was limited to property owners, who were primarily Italian. The first parliament consisted of 28 Italians, but only one Croat and one Slovene.

Many Istrian Italians looked with sympathy towards the Risorgimento movement that fought for the unification of Italy. However, after the Third Italian War of Independence (1866), when the Veneto and Friuli regions were ceded by the Austrians to the newly formed Kingdom Italy, Istria remained part of the Austro-Hungarian Empire, together with other Italian-speaking areas on the eastern Adriatic. This triggered the gradual rise of Italian irredentism among many Italians in Istria, who demanded the unification of Istria with Italy. The Italians in Istria supported the Italian Risorgimento: as a consequence, the Austrians saw the Italians as enemies and favored the Slav communities of Istria, fostering the nascent nationalism of Slovenes and Croats.

During the meeting of the Council of Ministers of 12 November 1866, Emperor Franz Joseph I of Austria outlined a wide-ranging project aimed at the Germanization or Slavization of the areas of the empire with an Italian presence:

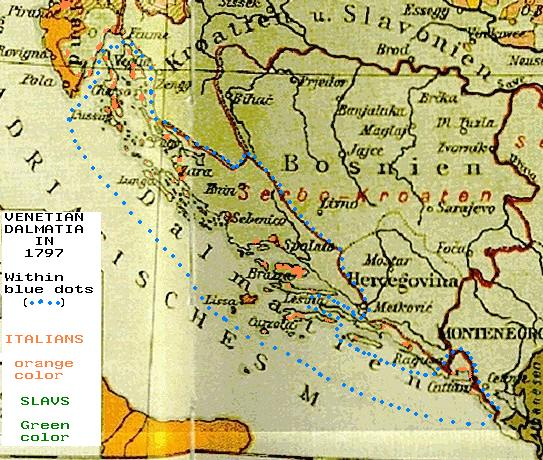
Austrian linguistic map from 1896. In green the areas where Slavs were the majority of the population, in orange the areas where Istrian Italians and Dalmatian Italians were the majority of the population. The boundaries of Venetian Dalmatia in 1797 are delimited with blue dots.

His Majesty expressed the precise order that action be taken decisively against the influence of the Italian elements still present in some regions of the Crown and, appropriately occupying the posts of public, judicial, masters employees as well as with the influence of the press, work in South Tyrol, Dalmatia and Littoral for the Germanization and Slavization of these territories according to the circumstances, with energy and without any regard. His Majesty calls the central offices to the strong duty to proceed in this way to what has been established.

— Franz Joseph I of Austria, Council of the Crown of 12 November 1866

There are claims Istrian Italians were more than 50% of the total population of Istria for centuries, while making up about a third of the population in 1900. However, in the part of Istria that eventually would become part of Croatia, the first Austrian census from 1846 found 34 thousand Italian speakers, alongside 120 thousand Croatian speakers. Until 1910, the proportion changed: there were 108 thousand Italian speakers and 134 thousand Croatian speakers. Vanni D'Alessio notes (2008), the Austrian surveys of the language of use (in the Austrian censuses, the ethnic composition of the population wasn't surveyed, only the "Umgangsprache") "overestimated the diffusion of the socially dominant languages of the empire... The capacity of assimilation of the Italian language suggests that amongst those who declared themselves Italian speakers in Istria, there were people whose mother tongue was different." In the second half of the 19th century, there was a fight for the national and political rights of the Croatian and Slovenian population in relation to the Italian population, strongly influenced by the Croatian national revival. Bishop Juraj Dobrila was the leader of the battle for Croatian rights in Istria. His concept was the activation of the people in the field of the national self-defence, the preservation of tradition, the improvement of economic and political situation, the acceptance of new civilization and cultural achievements, and finding the way to take the people out of misery. In one of his first demands to the Istrian Parliament in Poreč, he asked that the Croatian should become the official language, along with Italian.

With the First World War, national fights were interrupted. Italian interest in the eastern part of the Adriatic coast became very obvious. A secret agreement was made in London in April 1915, according to which Italy was promised South Tyrol, a part of Dalmatia and Istria with Trieste and Gorizia.

== Italian era ==
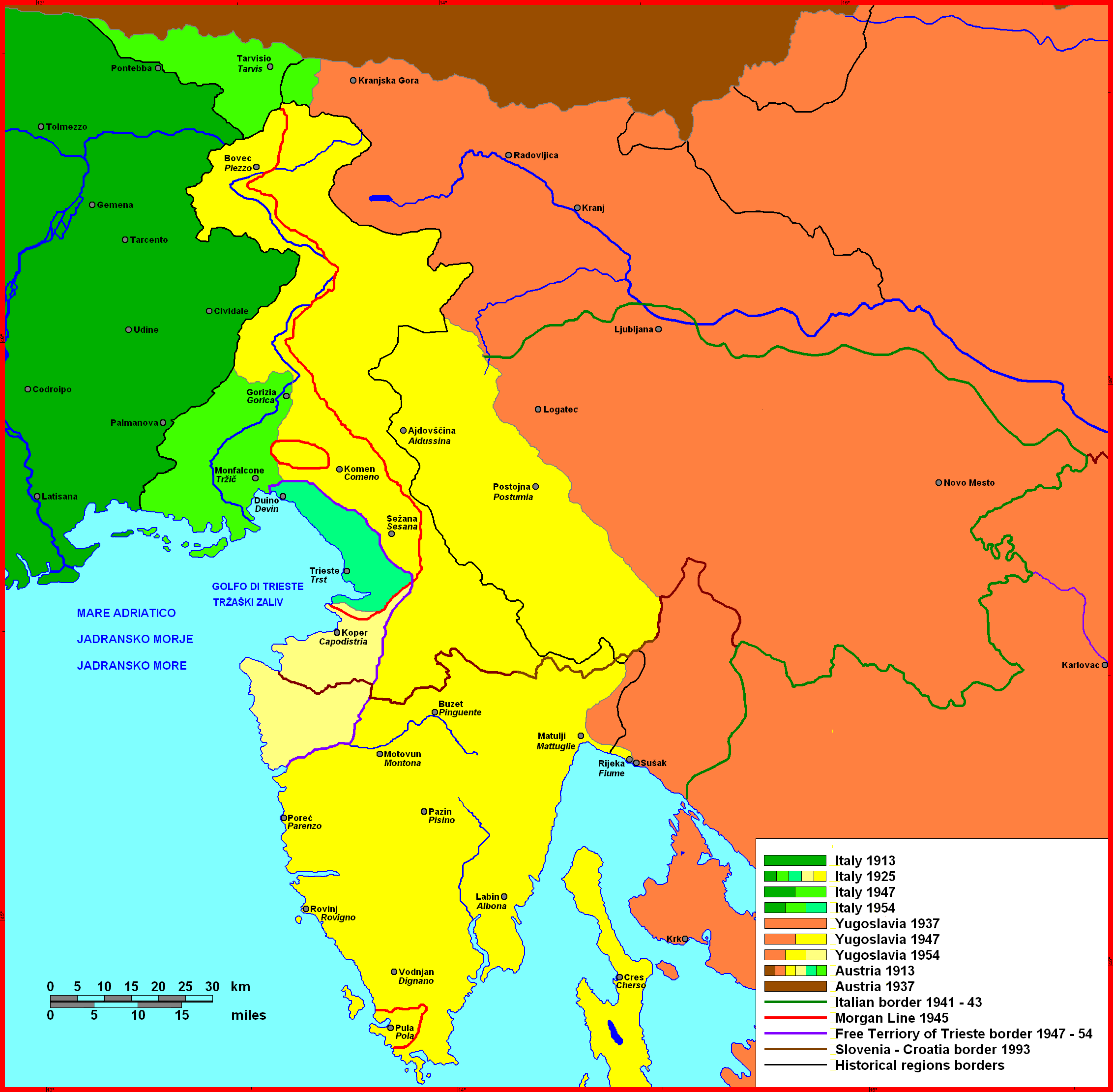
Changes to the Italian eastern border from 1920 to 1975. The Austrian Littoral, later renamed Julian March, which was assigned to Italy in 1920 with the Treaty of Rapallo (with adjustments of its border in 1924 after the Treaty of Rome) and which was then ceded to Yugoslavia in 1947 with the Treaty of Paris Areas annexed to Italy in 1920 and remained Italian even after 1947 Areas annexed to Italy in 1920, passed to the Free Territory of Trieste in 1947 with the Paris treaties and definitively assigned to Italy in 1975 with the Treaty of Osimo Areas annexed to Italy in 1920, passed to the Free Territory of Trieste in 1947 with the Paris treaties and definitively assigned to Yugoslavia in 1975 with the Osimo treaty

At the end of the First World War, Austria-Hungary was defeated in the battle of Vittorio Veneto and asked for an armistice, signed in Padova, on 3 November 1918. Istria was consequently occupied by the Italian Royal Army, under the terms of the armistice. At the peace conference in Paris, Italy was among the winning powers, and obtained the suzerainty over Istria, according to the terms of the Treaty of Rapallo.

After the advent of Fascism in 1922, the portions of the Istrian population that were Croatian and Slovene were exposed to a policy of forced Italianization and cultural suppression. During the period between the two world wars, Italians eradicated Croatian and Slovenian public and national life. They abolished all Croatian schools, cultural institutions and associations, and Croatian names were Italianized. Croatians lost their right to education and religious practice in their maternal languages. The population emigrated to the Kingdom of Yugoslavia on a large scale. The organization TIGR, regarded as the first armed antifascist resistance group in Europe, was founded in 1927 and soon penetrated into Slovene and Croatian-speaking parts of Istria.

After the capitulation of Italy in 1943, the Croatian Partisans organized an uprising in Istria. The same month, their political bodies, led by ZAVNOH in Croatia, published the so-called Pazin Decisions, announcing the annexation of Italian-occupied areas to Yugoslavia. The subsequent German occupation quelled the uprising, but after the Germans lost the war two years later, the Partisans proceeded to take most of the territory. The Yugoslav Partisans were however forced to split Istria into two Zones along the so-called Morgan Line: the Anglo-American-occupied Zone A and the Yugoslav-administered Zone B. These zones would eventually be abolished by the Paris Peace Treaties of 1947.

During the war in Istria, the Foibe massacres were committed by the local non-Italian population, due to the previous regime's oppression of non-Italians like such as forced Italianization which was the leading cause of resentment. This lingered and triggered the Istrian-Dalmatian exodus which significantly reduced the Italian population in Istria, particularly in urban areas.

== Period of Yugoslavia ==
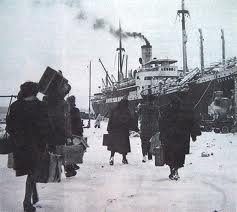
Istrian Italians leave Pula in 1947 during the Istrian–Dalmatian exodus

According to the Paris Peace Treaty of 1947, the territory between Novigrad and Trieste became the independent Free Territory of Trieste, while other parts were incorporated into Yugoslavia. The Free Territory of Trieste was also divided in two zones – Zone A (area around Trieste) and Zone B (the rest). Zone A was again under the Anglo-American administration, while Zone B was under the Yugoslav military administration, from which area most of the Italian population fled. After the dissolution of the Free Territory of Trieste in 1954, by London agreement, Italy was assigned Zone A, the region up to the present-day Slovenian/Italian border, while the remaining territory was incorporated into Yugoslavia as a part of its People's Republic of Croatia and the People's Republic of Slovenia. For the first time, the entire western coast of Istria became part of Croatia. The final border between the two states was defined in the agreement in the Italian town of Osimo (Treaty of Osimo) on 10 November 1975.

== In independent Croatia ==
Following the break-up of Yugoslavia in 1991, and international recognition of independent states of Croatia and Slovenia, the division of Istria between Croatia and Slovenia runs on the former republic borders. In December 1992, Istria became one of the twenty counties in the Republic of Croatia. The Gulf of Piran area is the subject of an ongoing border dispute between Croatia and Slovenia.

== See also ==
- History of the Republic of Venice
- History of Italy
- History of Croatia
- Istria County
- Italianization
- Roman Catholic Diocese of Poreč-Pula

== Bibliography ==
- Banić, Josip; Blancato, Sebastiano (2023). "The Agreement between the Patriarchate of Grado and the Patriarchate of Aquileia Regarding the Metropolitan Jurisdiction over Istrian Bishoprics (24th of July, 1180): New Critical Edition of the Charter" (PDF). Zgodovinski časopis. 77 (167): 8–37. Archived from the original on 2025-06-10.
- Bileta, Vedran (2014). "Remapping the Socio-political Landscape on the Fringes of an Imperium: The End of Byzantine Histria". Landscapes of Power: Selected Papers from the XV Oxford University Byzantine Society International Graduate Conference. Oxford: Peter Lang. pp. 111–124. ISBN 9783034317511.
- Bileta, Vedran (2017). "At the Crossroads of Late Antiquity and Early Middle Ages - The Rise and Fall of the Military Elite of Byzantine Histria". Annual of Medieval Studies at the Central European University. 11: 100–123.
- Džin, Kristina (2009). Žužić, Mirko (ed.). Arena Pula. Zagreb: Viza MG d.o.o. ISBN 978-953-7422-15-8.
- Jurkić-Girardi, Vesna (1988). "Istria in the Context of the 10th Italic Region "Venetia et Histria" as a Border Area of the Roman Empire". Balcanica (1987–1988): 109–114.
- Krahwinkler, Harald (2005). "Patriarch Fortunatus of Grado and the Placitum of Riziano" (PDF). Acta Histriae. 13 (1): 63–78.
- Luthar, Oto, ed. (2008). The Land Between: A History of Slovenia. Frankfurt am Main: Peter Lang.
- Štih, Peter (2010). The Middle Ages between the Eastern Alps and the Northern Adriatic: Select Papers on Slovene Historiography and Medieval History. Leiden-Boston: Brill.
- Vicelja-Matijašić, Marina (2005). "Byzantium and Istria: Some Aspects of Byzantine Presence in Istria" (PDF). Acta Histriae. 13 (1): 185–204.
- "Povijest (Povijest Istre od prapovijesti do 1918. g.)". Istrapedia (in Croatian).
- "Povijest (Povijest Istre od 1918.- 2000. g.)". Istrapedia (in Croatian).
- "Historic overview-more details". www.istra-istria.hr. Zgodovinsko društvo za južno Primorsko-Koper - Società storica del Litorale-Capodistria. Archived from the original on 2007-06-11.
- "Istria Between Purity and Hybridity: The Creation of the Istrian Region Through Scientific Research in the 19th Century". www.academia.edu. Istria County.
