= Conrad I of Merania =

12th-century Italian noble

Conrad I (died 18 February 1159) was the Duke of Merania from 1152 until his death. Thitherto he had been the advocate of St Andreas at Freising since 1150 and Count of Dachau (as Conrad II) from 1152.

== Origin ==
Conrad was the elder of two sons of Conrad I of Dachau, a member of the House of Wittelsbach. His younger brother was Arnold III of Dachau. Their father Conrad I of Dachau was a son of Arnold I of Scheyern, who was the youngest son of Otto I, Count of Scheyern.

== Life ==
Conrad inherited Dachau from his father and lands in Dalmatia which had formerly been the March of Carniola from his mother, Willibirg, who had inherited them from Adelaide, daughter of Poppo II of Carniola. Conrad married Adelaide, daughter of Henry, Duke of Lower Lorraine, sometime before 1140. They had no children and Conrad remarried after her death (before 1146). His second wife, Matilda of Falkenstein, gave him one son, Conrad II, who inherited Merania and, in 1172, Dachau.

Conrad was in Bamberg in February 1152, when King Conrad III died there. In late June or early July 1152, the Frederick I granted Conrad the title of duke for his lands around the Kvarner Gulf, possibly as a reward for helping Frederick secure the throne after the king's death. He used the title dux Meranus to refer to his coastal territory, but Bishop Otto I of Freising, in his history of Frederick's reign, calls him "Duke of Dalmatia and Croatia". He was also sometimes called "Duke of Dachau", but he was still officially a count there.

In 1156, Conrad gave Dachau to his younger brother Arnold. Conrad died in battle at Bergamo and was buried in Scheyern.

Preceded by New creation	Duke of Merania; 1152–1159	Succeeded by Conrad II
