= Conrad I =

Conrad I or Konrad I may refer to:

- Conrad I, Count of Auxerre (died c. 864), French count of several counties, including Paris 859–862/4
- Conrad I of Germany (881–918), Duke of Franconia and King of Germany in 911–918
- Conrad of Constance (900–975), German bishop and saint
- Conrad I, Duke of Swabia (915/920-997), ruled 983–997
- Conrad, Duke of Lorraine (c. 922 – 955)
- Conrad I of Burgundy (925–993)
- Conrad I of Spoleto, or Conrad of Ivrea (died 997)
- Conrad I, Duke of Carinthia (975–1011)
- Conrad I of Italy (989/990–1039), ruled as Conrad II, Holy Roman Emperor 1027–1039
- Conrad I, Duke of Bavaria (1020–1055), ruled 1049–1053
- Conrad I, Duke of Bohemia (c. 1035–1092), Duke of Bohemia in 1092
- Conrad I, Count of Luxembourg (1040–1086)
- Conrad I of Salzburg (c. 1075–1147), Archbishop of Salzburg 1106–1147
- Conrad I, Count of Württemberg (born before 1081), ruled 1083–1110
- Conrad I of Raabs (died 1143), Burgrave of Nuremberg c. 1105–1143
- Conrad I, Duke of Zähringen (c. 1090–1152)
- Conrad, Margrave of Meissen (c. 1097–1157), ruled 1123–1156
- Conrad I, Duke of Merania (died 1159), ruled 1152–1159
- Conrad of Montferrat or Conrad I of Jerusalem (died 1192), King of Jerusalem in 1190–1192
- Conrad of Wittelsbach (c. 1120/1125–1200), Archbishop of Mainz 1161–1165 and 1183–1200
- Conrad I, Duke of Spoleto (died 1202)
- Conrad I, Burgrave of Nuremberg (c. 1186–1261), ruled 1218–1261
- Konrad I of Masovia (c. 1187/8–1247), 6th Duke of Masovia, son of Casimir II and Helen of Moravia
- Conrad of Thuringia (1206–1240)
- Conrad I of Sanneck (died before 1255), Lord of Žovnek (Sanneck), in what is now Slovenia
- Konrad I of Meissen, or Konrad von Wallhausen (died 1258), Bishop of Meissen 1240–1258
- Conrad I of Sicily, also Conrad IV of Germany, (1228–1254)
- Konrad I, Duke of Głogów (c. 1228/29–1273/74)
- Conrad, Margrave of Brandenburg-Stendal (c. 1240–1304)
- Conrad I, Count of Oldenburg (died 1347)
- Konrad I of Oleśnica (c. 1294–1366)
