= Berthold II =

Berthold II may refer to:

- Berthold II, Duke of Carinthia (c. 1000–1078)
- Berthold II, Duke of Swabia (c. 1050–1111)
- Berthold II, Count of Andechs (before 1099–1151)
