= Poppo II =

Poppo II may refer to:

- Poppo, Duke of Thuringia (died after 906)
- Poppo II, Margrave of Carniola (died 1098)
