= Duke of Dalmatia =

The title Duke of Dalmatia may refer to:

- the governors of the Byzantine Dalmatia
- Doge of Venice, used the title between 1000 and 1358
- Duke of Merania, sometimes called Duke of Dalmatia
- Duke of Slavonia, occasionally used the title in the 13th and 14th centuries
- Jean-de-Dieu Soult, who was granted the title by Napoleon I in 1808

== See also ==
- List of rulers of Croatia
