= Haziga of Diessen =

- Born: c. 1040
- Died: 1 August 1104
- Spouses: Herman of Kastl; Otto I, Count of Scheyern
- Father: Frederick II, Count of Diessen

Haziga of Diessen, also known as Hadegunde (c. 1040 – 1 August 1104) was a Countess consort of Scheyern. Her descent is not entirely clear. It is usually assumed that her father was Count Frederick II of Diessen. He was Vogt of the Cathedral chapter in Regensburg. He was married three times; it is unclear in which marriage Haziga was born.

Around 1080, she founded a Benedictine monastery in Bayrischzell. It was moved to Fischbachau in 1085, then to Petersberg, near Dachau in 1104 and finally to Scheyern in 1119.

== Marriages and issue ==
Her first husband was Count Herman of Kastl (d. 27 January 1056). With him, she probably had two sons and a daughter:

- Herman, Count of Cham (d. after 1071)
- Frederick I, Count of Kastl and Habsburg (d. 10 November 1103)
- Matilda, married Count Rapoto III of Upper Traungau (d. 15 October 1080)

Her second husband was Count Otto I of Scheyern (d. 4 December 1078). It was also his second marriage. He had four children; it is possible some or all of these were from his first marriage:

- Arnold I (d. before 26 March 1123)
- Eckhard I (d. before 11 May 1091)
- Bernard I (d. 2 March 1104)
- Otto II (d. 31 October 1120)
