= Heinrich I of Pegnitz =

German noble (c. 1000 – c. 1043)

Heinrich I, Count of Pegnitz (c. 1000 – c. 1043) is a contested early ancestor of the House of Wittelsbach. He was born in Pegnitz to allegedly either Henry von Schweinfurt, Margrave of the Nordgau or Count Berthold of Schweinfurt (and either of their respective spouses). Thus meaning he was the paternal great-grandson or grandson of Arnulf, Duke of Bavaria, making him and the House of Wittelsbach descendants of the Luitpoldings. His first wife was the daughter of Conrad, Count of Altdorf and his second wife was an unnamed Countess of Welf. Heinrich I died circa 1043 in Scheyern. He had 6 children who are as follows:

1. Otto I, Count of Scheyern - Founder of the House of Wittelsbach.
2. Konrad, Count of Lechsgemünd- Lord of Frontenhausen and of Reichspoldesberg.
3. Heinrich II, Count of Pegnitz.
4. Eberhard I von Vohburg-Schweinfurt - Bishop of Eichstätt from 1100 to 1112.
5. Marquis Otto of Schweinfurt.
6. Friedrich I, Count of Burg-Lengenfeld.
7. Meinhardt I, Count of Kino der Toten
