= Berthold II of Andechs =

German nobleman (before 1105 – 1151)

Berthold II
- Count of Andechs
- Coat-of-arms of Andechs
- Born: before 1099
- Died: 27 June 1151
- Noble family: House of Andechs
- Spouses: Sophia of Istria; Kunigunde of Formbach-Pitten
- Issue: Berthold I of Istria; Mechtildis of Edelstetten
- Father: Count Arnold of Dießen
- Mother: Gisela of Schweinfurt

Berthold II of Andechs (also known as Berthold IV, Berchtold, or Bertholf; before 1099 – 27 June 1151), a member of the House of Andechs, was a German nobleman. He was a ruling count of Dießen and Andechs in the Duchy of Bavaria, of Plassenburg and Kulmbach in Franconia, as well as bailiff of Benediktbeuern Abbey.

== Life ==
Berthold's ancestry has not been conclusively established. According to the Europäische Stammtafeln genealogy, he was probably the elder son and heir of Count Arnold of Dießen (d. 1098) and his wife Gisela of Schweinfurt, a daughter of Duke Otto III of Swabia. He thereby was a grandson of Count Frederick II of Dießen (d. 1075).

In 1098, he inherited his father's Bavarian possessions around the Ammersee and Lake Starnberg, as well as those in Upper Franconia. Around 1120, he could succeed the comital Sigimar dynasty as bailiff (Vogt) of Benediktbeuern Abbey, and thereby increased his influence considerably. He co-founded the abbey of Dießen (where in 1130 he was documented to be bailiff) and maintained relations with Admont Abbey in the March of Styria. When his daughter Kunigunde entered Admont Abbey, he donated 15 Hufen (oxgangs) of land in Moosburg, Carinthia to the monastery.

Around 1100, Berthold built a new residence on a hill outside Andechs, which later became the site of Andechs Abbey. A little later, in the early 1130s, he built Plassenburg Castle north of Bayreuth; from 1137, he styled himself "Count of Plassenburg". He probably founded the town of Kulmbach around the same time at the foot of the hill below Plassenburg Castle; the town is first mentioned in contemporary sources in 1174.

He was married to Sophia (d. 1132), a daughter of Margrave Poppo II of Istria (d. 1103), a member of the House of Weimar-Orlamünde. She brought more prestige into the marriage, and the family's first possessions southeast of the Alps. She was of royal blood: her paternal grandmother was Sophia, a daughter of King Béla I of Hungary, from the House of Árpád. When Sophia's cousin, Margrave Poppo III of Istria died in childless, after 1141, his possessions were divided by the husbands of his widow and his sisters; thus Berthold, the Counts of Sponheim and the Counts of Bogen secured extensive possessions in Carniola, Lower Styria and Carinthia. Between 1143 and 1147, Bethold became Count of Stein.

After 1140, Berthold spent much of his time at the court of King Conrad III of Germany; this was probably related to a dispute he had with the Archbishop of Bamberg, who felt that Berthold threatened his worldly power in Upper Franconia.

== Marriage and issue ==
Berthold married twice. His first wife was Sophia, a daughter of Margrave Poppo II of Carniola (d. 1103), a member of the House of Weimar-Orlamünde. Together, they had the following children:

- Poppo (d. 1148)
- Berthold III (d. 1188)
- Otto (d. 1196), Bishop of Brixen from 1165 to 1170 and Bishop of Bamberg from 1177 until his death
- Gisela (d. after 1150), married Count Diepold II of Berg-Schelklingen (d. 1160/1165)

After Sophia's death, he married Kunigunde, a daughter of Count Egbert II of Formbach-Pitten, the heiress of Formbach. With her, he had the following children:

- Mechtildis (d. 1160), Abbess of Edelstetten Abbey
- Euphemia (d. 1180), abbess of Altmünster Abbey
- Kunigunde (d. 1139), a nun at Admont Abbey

== Sources ==
- Newman, Martha G. (2020). Cistercian Stories for Nuns and Monks. University of Pennsylvania Press.
