= Duchy of Merania =

Fiefdom of the Holy Roman Empire (1153–1248)

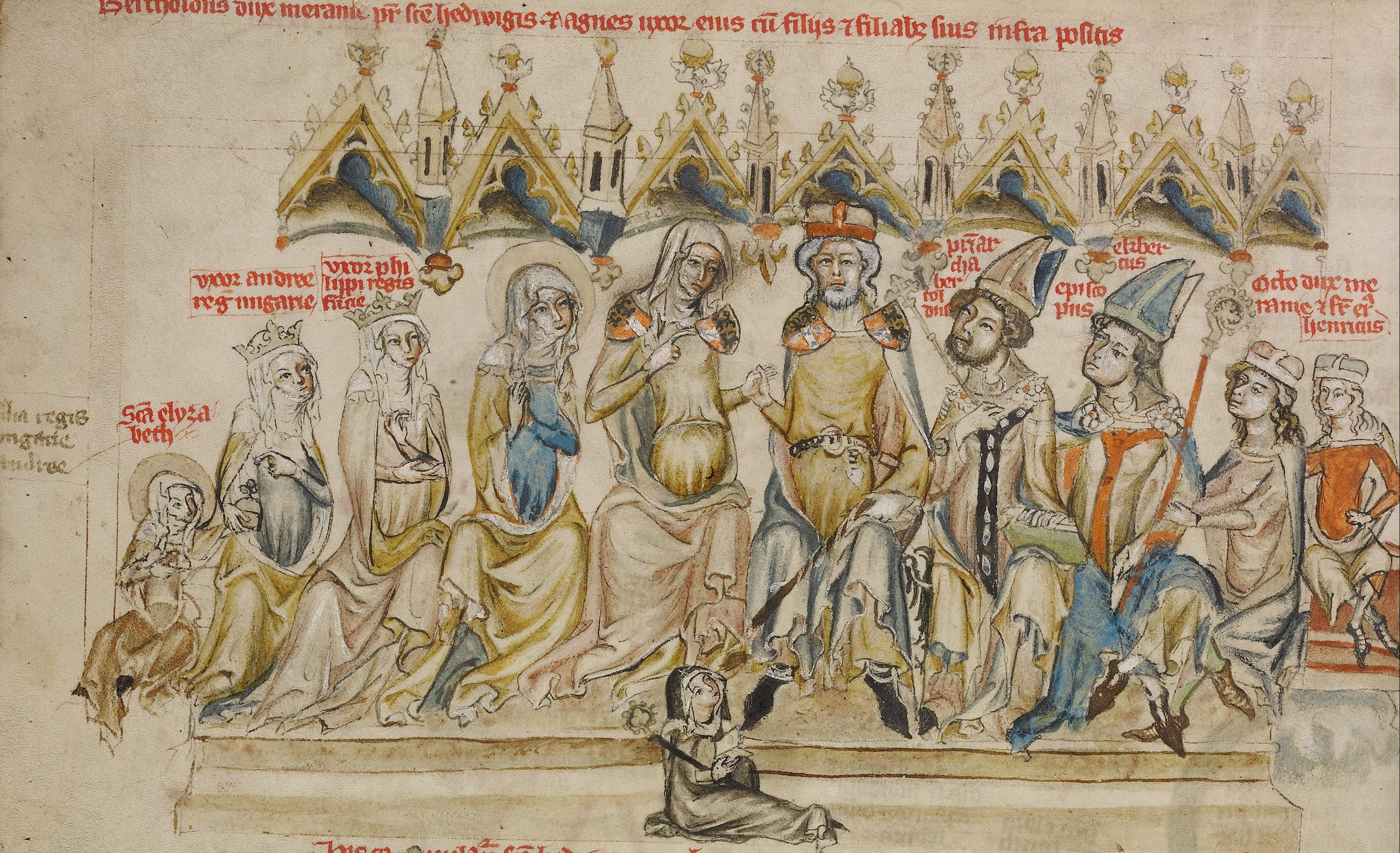
The family of Duke Berthold, from the Hedwig Codex.

The Duchy of Merania (Note: Latin: Ducatus Meraniae) was a fiefdom of the Holy Roman Empire from 1152 until 1248. The dukes of Merania were recognised as princes of the Empire enjoying imperial immediacy at a time when these concepts were just coming into use to distinguish the highest ranks of imperial nobility.

The name "Merania" ("sea-land") comes from either the High German word for sea, meer or the Slavic word for the same, morje (both cognate with Latin mare). The name literally means "land by the sea" (am Meer), referring to its location on the Adriatic.

== Territory ==
The exact territorial extent of Merania is unknown. It probably included the town of Fiume (Rijeka) and the coast of the Kvarner Gulf, either on the Istrian peninsula or across from it. The author of the Historia de expeditione Friderici imperatoris, an account of Barbarossa's crusade of 1190, writing around 1200, refers to "the Duke of Dalmatia, also called Croatia or Merania", specifying (imprecisely) that the duchy neighboured Zahumlje and Raška. The actual duchy contained at most only a small part of the region of Dalmatia, which had historically belonged to Croatia. By the twelfth century, Croatia was in a personal union with Hungary.

This territory came under imperial control during the reign of Henry IV. According to the fourteenth-century Chronicon pictum Vindobonense (Viennese Illustrated Chronicle), the "march of Dalmatia" (marchia Dalmacie) was occupied by the Carinthians between 1064 and 1068 during the reign of Dmitar Zvonimir, who in fact was not king of Croatia until 1075. Despite this inconsistency in the chronicle, several modern historians, led by Ljudmil Hauptmann, have connected this Dalmatian borderland with the later duchy of Merania. According to the historians Miho Barada and Lujo Margetić, it was the accession of the young King Stephen II of Hungary in 1116 that provided an opportunity for the Emperor Henry V to annex the entire eastern coast of Istria and the coast opposite as far as the river Rječina, including the city of Fiume. This territory, conquered for the emperor by the lords of Duino (Devin), became known as Merania. It is not clear to what extent the Meranian dukes of the Dachau or Andechs lines ever managed to exert their control over the region.

There are other theories proposing a different etymology of "Merania". Erwin Herrmann argues that the name cannot have actually been in use as the name of a region, since it is unknown save as the name of the duchy that existed between 1152 and 1248. He argues that it is probably formed from the name of the seat of the lordship, which he identifies with the town of Marano Lagunare. The region he identifies as that between the rivers Tagliamento and Corno.

In older literature, Merania is sometimes mistakenly identified with Meran, a town in the Tyrol, because the Andechser dukes held land in the Tyrol. August Dimitz, while correcting the Tyrolean error, equates Merania with the march of Istria.

== House of Dachau (1152–1180) ==
The duchy of Merania was created for the Wittelsbach Count Conrad II of Dachau by the Emperor Frederick Barbarossa during an Imperial Diet at Regensburg in June 1152 by separating some lordships from the marches of Carniola and Istria, which were under the jurisdiction of the Duchy of Bavaria. Merania thus bordered the Kingdom of Croatia, which belonged to Hungary. This was done despite the fact that the Diet had refused to approve Frederick's proposed invasion of Hungary. Rather than an attempt to circumvent the diet in his designs on Hungary, it can be seen as part of a more general policy, pre-dating Frederick's reign, of elevating noblemen of the rank of count to that of duke as a counterweight to the powerful hereditary dukes of the so-called stem duchies (like Bavaria). It was also part of a reorganisation of the southeastern frontier that included the creation of the Duchy of Austria in 1156.

The historian Wilhelm Wegener has proposed that Merania was created out of lands claimed by Conrad through his mother, Willibirg, daughter of Udalschalk, count of Lurngau, and Adelaide, daughter of Margrave Ulrich I of Carniola. He proposed that Willibirg was heir to Adelaide, who was heir to her brother Ulrich II (died 1112). Thus, the creation of Conrad's duchies was a partial vindication of his claims on Carniola and had a hereditary basis. This theory had not found wide acceptance, since several duchies were created in Germany in the twelfth century with no clearly hereditary basis.

These new ducal titles created in the twelfth century were often based on insignificant or diminished territories. Merania was small, with little in the way of rights or income for its holder. The ducal title that technically pertained only to the newly acquired territory was thus also often used in conjunction with the dynastic seat, and Conrad was thus sometimes known as the Duke of Dachau. Bishop Otto I of Freising, in his history of Barbarossa's reign, calls Conrad the Duke of Croatia and Dalmatia, an impressive if imprecise title that alluded to the origin of the lands in question as part of Croatia.

It has been argued that since neither Duke Conrad I nor his son, Conrad II, is ever recorded as having visited the region around the Istrian peninsula or the Kvarner Gulf, it is more likely that their title referred to unspecified lands around the southeastern frontier but not actually under imperial control. On this theory, Merania was at first a purely titular dignity for the Dachauers that only became a territorial reality under the Andechsers, who created it out of lands they held in the far southeast.

== House of Andechs (1180–1248) ==
In 1180, Frederick Barbarossa transferred Merania to Berthold, the son of the count of Andechs. This was probably done in order to maintain a balance of power and rank between the House of Andechs and the House of Wittelsbach, which had received the Duchy of Bavaria earlier that year. Although some sources ascribe the transfer of Merania to Conrad's death and propose that Berthold was his heir through his mother, in fact Conrad II did not die until 1182. The transfer of 1180 was part of a reorganization of the southeastern frontier by the emperor.

Berthold inherited the marches of Istria and Carniola from his father in 1188. Although the Andechsers' primary lands lay elsewhere in the Empire, their southeastern connection involved them in its foreign affairs. When Barbarossa passed through the Balkans on his crusade in 1189, he negotiated the marriage of one of Berthold's daughters to Toljen, the eldest son of Prince Miroslav of Zahumlje, a younger brother of Grand Prince Stefan Nemanja of Serbia. Although Berthold consented, the marriage probably never took place. In any case, the duke of Merania was considered a near neighbour of the Serb princes. The Andechsers pushed the empire's southeastern frontier further south, acquiring Gottschee, Črnomelj and Metlika for Merania–Carniola at the expense of the kings of Hungary.

On Berthold's death in 1204 Merania went to his eldest son, Otto I, and Istria to a younger son, Henry. In the 1240s, the duke of Merania, Otto II, who had numerous possessions throughout southern Germany, was involved in a dispute with the duke of Bavaria that turned into open warfare. In 1248, the duchy fell vacant with the extinction of the Andechs-Meranier and was broken up, mostly going to Istria.

== List of dukes ==
- Conrad I (1152–1159), also count of Dachau (as Conrad II)
- Conrad II (1159–1180), also count of Dachau (as Conrad III)
- Berthold (1180–1204), also count of Andechs (as Berthold IV) and margrave of Istria and Carniola (as Berthold II)
- Otto I (1204–1234), also count of Andechs (as Otto VII), margrave of Istria and Carniola (as Otto I) and count of Burgundy (as Otto II)
- Otto II (1234–1248), also count of Andechs (as Otto VIII), margrave of Istria and Carniola (as Otto II) and count of Burgundy (as Otto III)
