= Conrad II of Merania =

Duke of Merania

Conrad II (died 8 October 1182) was the Duke of Merania (or Dalmatia) from 1159 until his death. He became Count of Dachau (as Conrad III) in 1172.

Conrad was the only child of Conrad I, Duke of Merania, and Matilda of Falkenstein. He was only a child when his father died and he inherited Merania. When he came of age, he received Dachau from his uncle Arnold. Contemporary documents call him dux de Dachawe or Dachau. Conrad II was the last Wittelsbach duke as he died without heirs and was buried in Scheyern beside his father, grandfather, and great-grandfather. Merania passed then to the House of Andechs.

Preceded by Conrad I	Duke of Merania; 1159–1182	Succeeded by Berthold
