= Eckhard I of Scheyern =

Count of Scheyern (c. 1044–1091)

Eckhard I, Count of Scheyern
- Born: c. 1044
- Died: Before 11 May 1091
- Noble family: House of Wittelsbach
- Spouse: Richardis of Carniola-Orlamünde
- Issue: Otto IV, Count of Scheyern
- Father: Otto I, Count of Scheyern

Eckhard I of Scheyern, also Ekkehard von Scheyern (c. 1044 – died before 11 May 1091), was a son of Otto I, Count of Scheyern. His mother cannot be unambiguously determined because Otto I Scheyern was first married to Haziga of Diessen (the widow of Count Herman of Kastl) and later to an unknown daughter of Count Meginhardt of Reichersbeuern, and the date of Eckhard's birth is not known.

Eckhard I was Vogt of Freising from 1074, and Vogt of Weihenstephan from 1082.

== Marriage and children ==
Eckhard was married to Richardis, a daughter of Ulric I, Margrave of Carniola and Sophia of Hungary. They had three sons:

- Udalrich I, Count of Scheyern (from 1130 provost of Freising) (de)
- Otto IV, Count of Scheyern, Count Palatine of Bavaria since 1120 (d. 22 Aug 1123) (V of Wittelsbach, IV of Scheyern)
- Eckhard II of Scheyern (d. c. 1135) (de)

== Sources ==
- Jeffery, Renée (2018). Princess Elisabeth of Bohemia: The Philosopher Princess. Lexington Books.
- Murray, Alan V. (1997). "The Chronicle of Zimmern as a source for the First Crusade". In Phillips, Jonathan (ed.). The First Crusade: Origins and Impact. Manchester University Press.
