= Otto IV of Scheyern =

Bavarian count (c. 1083–1156)

Otto V, Count of Wittelsbach
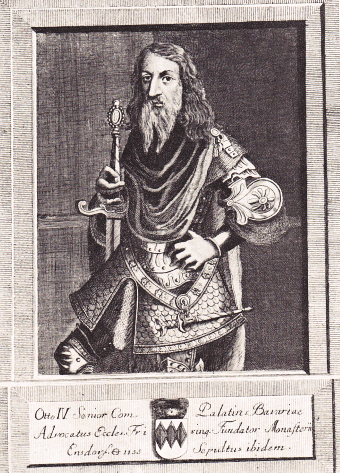
- Born: c. 1083
- Died: 4 August 1156
- Noble family: House of Wittelsbach
- Spouse: Heilika of Pettendorf-Lengenfeld
- Issue: Otto; Conrad; Frederick; Udalrich; Otto; Hedwig; Adelheid
- Father: Eckhard I, Count of Scheyern
- Mother: Richardis of Carniola

Otto V, Count of Wittelsbach (c. 1083 – 4 August 1156), also called Otto IV, Count of Scheyern, was the second son of Eckhard I, Count of Scheyern and Richardis of Carniola and Istria. Otto named himself Otto of Wittelsbach, after Wittelsbach Castle near Aichach. He served Henry V, Holy Roman Emperor, in his first Italian Expedition in 1110–1111. Emperor Henry V already addressed him as Otto Count of "Witlinesbac" in a document in 1115. From 1120 onwards, he was Count palatine of Bavaria.

From 1110 to 1111 Otto V was in the First Italian Campaign in the entourage of German King Henry V. During this campaign, King Henry and Count Otto had kidnapped Pope Paschal II in order for the Pope to crown Henry Emperor of the Holy Roman Empire.

When the ancestral seat of the von Scheyern family was relocated to Wittelsbach Castle near Aichach, Otto began calling himself 'Otto V. of Wittelsbach' in 1116. He was thus the namesake for the ruling house of the Wittelsbachers, who ruled Bavaria until 1918.

Since Otto had participated in the capture of Pope Paschal in 1111, he was excommunicated from church, along with Emperor Henry. In order to atone for his sins for kidnapping the earlier Pope, (who was now deceased) Otto founded the Augustinian monastery and church in Indersdorf in 1120, in order for the present Pope, Calixtus II, to remove the excommunication.

== Marriage and children ==
On 13 July 1116 Otto married Heilika of Pettendorf-Lengenfeld, a daughter of Count Frederick III of Pettendorf-Lengenfeld-Hopfenohe, by whom he had issue:

- Hermann
- Otto I, Duke of Bavaria, known as Otto the Redhead (der Rotkopf) (1117–1183), "Otto VI" as Count Palatine of Bavaria 1156-1180, "Otto I" as Duke of Bavaria 1180-1183. The first ruler of Bavaria from the House of Wittelsbach.
- Conrad of Wittelsbach, successively Archbishop of Mainz and Archbishop of Salzburg
- Frederick II of Wittelsbach (died 1198 or 1199)

married 1184 a daughter of the Count of Mangold (Donau)wörth

- Udalrich of Wittelsbach (died 29 March 1179)
- Otto VII (died 1189), Count Palatine of Bavaria from 1180 until his death, having succeeded in that office his elder brother Otto the Redhead, Duke of Bavaria. He married Benedicta of Donauwörth, daughter of the Count of Mangold (Donau)wörth. He was the father of:
  - Otto VIII, Count Palatine of Bavaria (1180–1209), who succeeded his father as Count Palatine of Bavaria from 1189 to 1208; infamous for having in 1208 murdered Philip of Swabia, King of Germany.
- Hedwig (died 16 July 1174)

married (before 1153) Berthold III, Count of Andechs (c. 1123 – 14 December 1188)

- Adelheid

married Otto II of Stefling

== Sources ==
- Jeffery, Renée (2018). Princess Elisabeth of Bohemia: The Philosopher Princess. Lexington Books.
- Lyon, Jonathan R. (2013). Princely Brother and Sisters: The Sibling Bond in German Politics, 1100-1250. Cornell University Press.

Otto IV of Scheyern House of Wittelsbach Born: 1083 Died: 4 August 1156
German royalty
Regnal titles
Preceded by Engelbert I	Count Palatine of Bavaria; 1116–1156	Succeeded by Otto VI
