= Frederick II of Diessen =

Frederick II
- Count of Dießen
- Born: 1005
- Died: 1075 (aged 69–70); St. Blaise Abbey
- Buried: Seeon Abbey
- Noble family: House of Andechs
- Spouses: Hadamut of Eppenstein; Irmgard of Gilching; Tuta of Regensburg
- Father: Frederick of Dießen
- Mother: Hemma of Swabia

Frederick II of Dießen (also known as Frederick I of Regensburg; 1005 – 1075) was a German nobleman. He is documented as bailiff (Vogt) of the Regensburg cathedral chapter from 1030/35 onward. He is one of the earliest known ancestors of the Counts of Andechs. The necrology of Seeon records his death on 30 June 1075 as “Fridricus com de Andex,” and notes that he is buried there.

== Life ==
His father was Count Frederick of Dießen (d. c. 1030), a relative of the legendary Bavarian count Rasso (d. 954), who administered the area around Dießen and Haching. His mother was Hemma, a daughter of Duke Conrad I of Swabia.

He became Domvogt of Regensburg in 1035. In 1055, he became Count in the Sempt area.

He died in 1075, as a lay brother in the Sankt Blasien Abbey in the Black Forest.

== Marriages and issue ==
Frederick married three times:

1. Hadamut (d. 1060), a daughter of Eberhard of Eppenstein. Together, they had one daughter:
  - Haziga (c. 1040 – 1 August 1104), also known as Hadegunde, married Herman of Kastl and secondly Otto I, Count of Scheyern
2. Irmgard of Gilching. Together, they had the following children:
  - Uta, married Kuno of Rott, Count palatine of Bavaria
  - Arnold (d. after 1091), succeeded his father as Count of Dießen
  - Frederick, succeeded as Vogt of the cathedral chapter of Regensburg
  - Meinhard (d. after 1070), succeeded as Count of Gilching
  - Hemma
  - Liutgard, married Count Adalbert I of Bogen
  - Berthold, Count jure uxoris of Schwarzenburg
3. Tuta, a daughter of the Vogt Hartwig I of Regensburg. This marriage was childless.
