= Ulric II of Carniola =

Ulric II (also Ulrich, Odalric, Oudalricus, Udalrich) (died 13 May 1112) was the Margrave of Istria from 1098 until circa 1107 and Carniola from 1098 until his death. He was the second son of Ulric I and Sophia, a daughter of Bela I of Hungary.

Ulric was created Count of Weimar when still a child in 1067. He inherited both of his father's marches on the death of his brother Poppo II in 1098, but was divested of Istria sometime between 1101 and 1107, when it went to Engelbert II of Sponheim, whose father had preceded Ulric's brother in the march. Ulric was described as de Saxonie principus. He married Adelaide (died 1146), daughter of Louis II, Count of Thuringia, but left no children. His sister Adelaide passed on the Carniolan inheritance to her grandson Conrad I, Duke of Merania.

== Sources ==
- Lyon, Jonathan R. (2013). Princely Brothers and Sisters: The Sibling Bond in German Politics, 1100-1250. Cornell University Press.
- Paschini, Pio (1913). "Vicende del Friuli durante il dominio della casa imperiale di Franconia". Memorie storiche cividalesi: bulletino del R. Museo di (in Italian). Vol. 9. Presso la Societa Storica. pp. 176–206.
