= Mechtildis of Edelstetten =

Saint Mechtildis
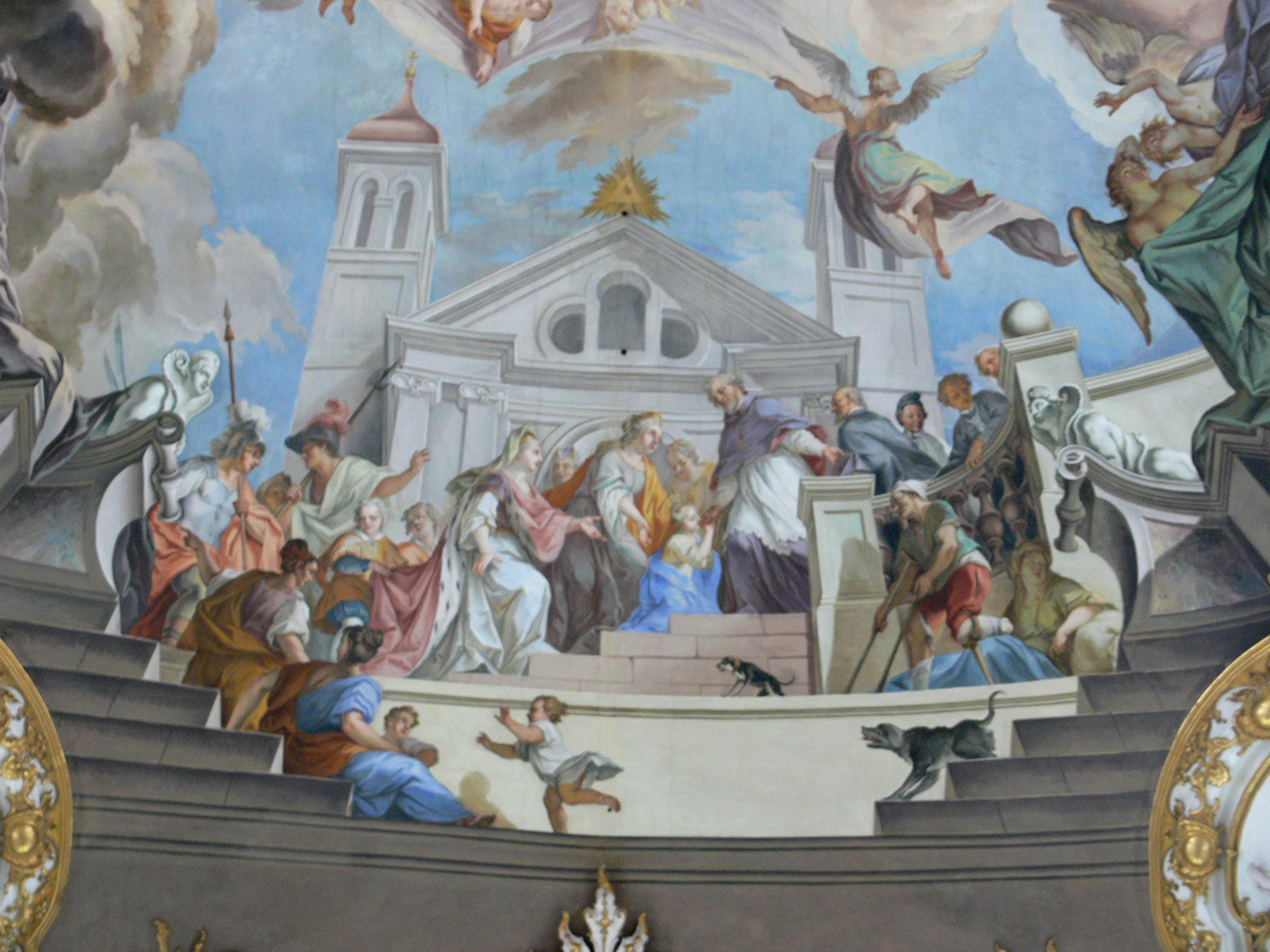
- Admission of St. Mechtildis to Edelstetten Abbey
- Born: Bavaria, Germany
- Died: 31 May 1160; Diessen, Bavaria, Germany
- Venerated in: Catholic Church
- Feast: 31 May

Mechtildis of Edelstetten, also known as Mechtildis of Diessen or Mechtildis of Andechs, was a Benedictine abbess and, according to legend, a renowned miracle worker. Mechtildis was the daughter of Count Berthold of Andechs, whose wife, Sophie, founded a monastery on their estate at Diessen, Bavaria, and placed their daughter there at the age of five. In 1153, the Bishop of Augsburg placed her as Abbess of Edelstetten Abbey. Mechtildis was known for her mystical gifts and miracles. She died at Diessen, Germany, on 31 May 1160. Her adorned remains lie in a glass shrine within the Marienmünster church of that town.
