= Rižana (river) =

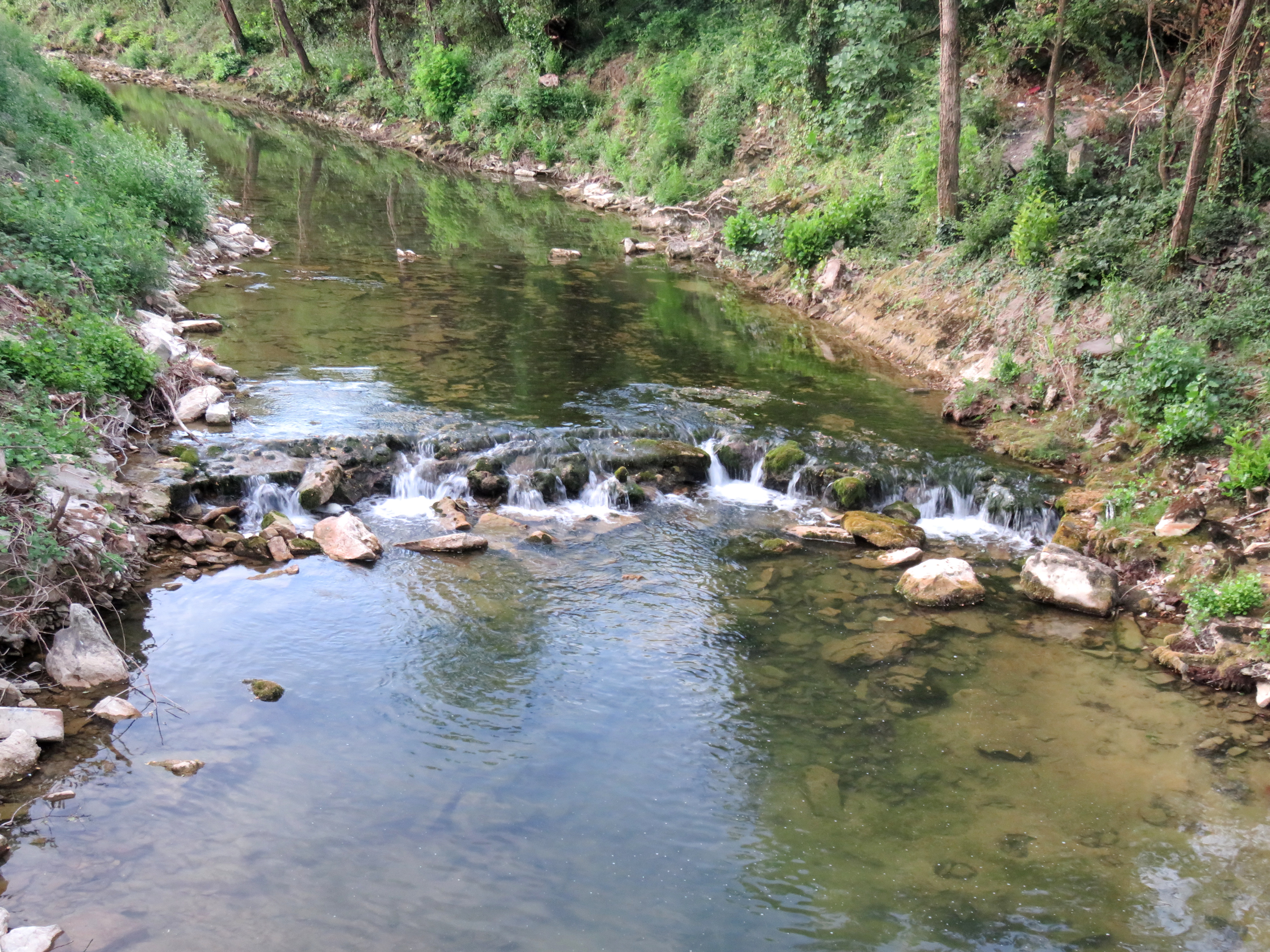
- The Rižana in the village of Rižana

Location
- Country: Slovenia

Physical characteristics
- Source
  - location: Assumption Church in Bezovica
  - elevation: 73 metres (240 ft)
- Mouth
  - location: Gulf of Trieste
  - coordinates: 45.558127°N 13.733910°E
  - elevation: 0 metres (0 ft)
- Length: 14 km (8.7 mi)
- Basin size: 202 km^{2} (78 sq mi)
- Discharge
  - average: 4.6 m^{3}/s (160 cu ft/s)

The Rižana is a river in Slovenia. It has also been known as the Risano. It was known as the Formio in Latin.

== Geography ==
The village of Rižana is located upon it. Its mouth is on or near the Gulf of Trieste of the Adriatic Sea. The Škocjan Lagoon Nature Reserve is a park area of wetlands where the Rižana and Badaševica rivers used to flow into the sea.

== Name ==
The Rižana was attested in historical sources as Rusano c. 670, Riziano c. 804, Risano in 1135, and Garzignana in 1569, among other spellings. The origin of the name is pre-Slavic and is probably related to the Illyrian toponym Ῥιζάνα Rhizana, reflected in the Montenegrin toponym Risan. The name is probably derived from the Proto-Indo-European root *erei̯H- 'to flow'.
