= John of Istria =

9th Century Duke of Istria

John was the Frankish Duke of Istria in the early years of the 9th century, soon after its conquest by Charlemagne.

In 804, in the Placitum of Riziano, the denizens of the nine cities of Istria complained to Charlemagne that John was ignoring their ancient privileges. John had taken away the privileges of sea-fishing and pasturing in public forests. He had abolished the old hierarchy and either abolished the offices of tribune, domesticus, vicarius, and hypatus or filled them Franks. He seized lands and confiscated the taxes (344 solidi mancusi annually from the cities) for himself. He forced many to serve in the army personally, alongside their slaves, and to demand corvée labour. John explained that he had been ignorant of the customs of Istria and promised to make amends and ceased exacting corvées. It is unknown if he did.

== Sources ==
- Wickham, Chris. Early Medieval Italy: Central Power and Local Society 400-1000. MacMillan Press: 1981.
