= Poppo I of Carniola =

Poppo I (also Boppo; died 13 July, before 1044), Count of Weimar-Orlamünde, was margrave of Istria from 1012 and of Carniola from 1040 to his death.

Poppo was the scion of a comital family from the Imperial Landgraviate of Thuringia. His father was Count William II of Weimar.

He married Hadamut, the daughter of one Count Weriand, who in 1001 had received large estates in eastern Friuli and Istria, then part of the March of Verona ruled by the Carinthian dukes, from the hands of Emperor Otto III. Poppo thus inherited a claim to the Istrian peninsula and began to use the margravial title. After King Henry III of Germany had inherited the Duchy Carinthia, he in 1040 established the separate Marches of Istria and Carniola. As his wife's mother was related to the Bavarian Counts of Ebersberg, who held possessions in Carniola, Poppo was also appointed Carniolan margrave.

Hadamut gave him one son, Ulric I, who succeeded his father in 1045.

Preceded by new creation	Margrave of Istria; 1012–1044	Succeeded by Ulric I
Preceded by new creation	Margrave of Carniola; 1040–1044	Succeeded by Ulric I
