= Placitum of Riziano =

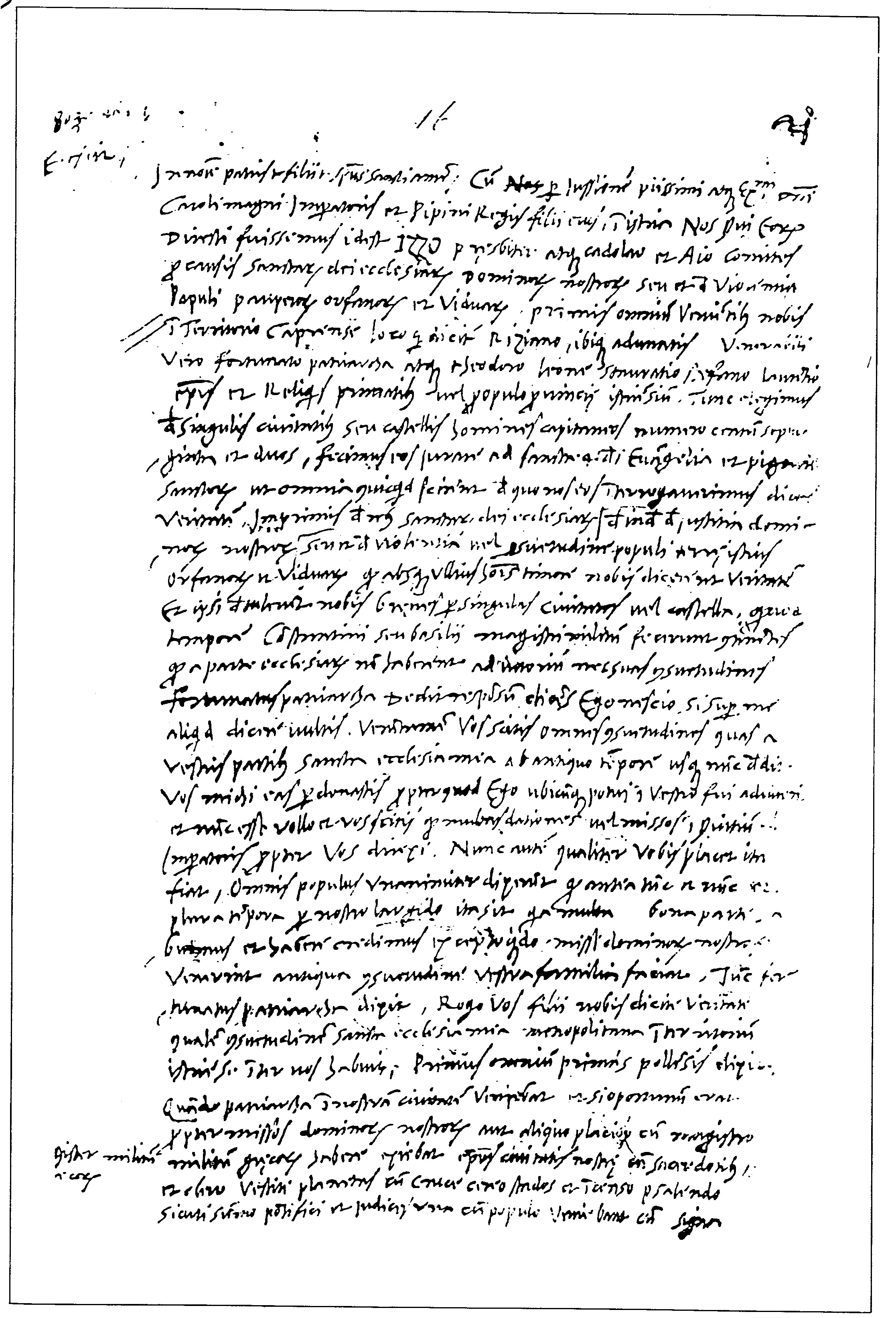
Riziano assembly manuscript, AD 804, page 1

The Placitum of Riziano (Italian: Placito del Risano; Slovene: Rižanski zbor) was a dispute that took place c. 804 around the Rizano River, probably at Rižana in modern Slovenia. The document is important for the history of Koper and Trieste because it is the first written evidence of the presence of a Slavic-speaking population in Istria close to Trieste.

Legates sent by Charlemagne heard complaints by the leaders of Istria about the bishops and the John, Duke of Istria. The document is believed to have been recorded on the orders of Fortunatus II, patriarch of Grado. A point of historiographical contention is the fact that only the leaders of the coastal towns of Istria were present; one explanation for this is that the issues being discussed (for example, the abolition of the right of the townspeople to fish) only affected the coast.

The Latin text has been edited many times, but the standard edition is by Manaresi. The text has been translated into various modern languages.
