= Ulric I of Carniola =

11th Century Margrave of Carniola and Istria

Ulric I (German: Ulrich I.), also Odalric or Udalrich (died 6 March 1070), Count of Weimar-Orlamünde, was margrave of Carniola from 1045 and of Istria from 1060 to his death.

== Life ==
Ulric was the son of Margrave Poppo I of Carniola and Hadamut, daughter of Count Werigand of Friuli and Istria. He succeeded his father upon his death before 1044.

Ulric married Sophia, the daughter of King Béla I of Hungary and his first wife, Richeza, sister of the Polish duke Casimir I the Restorer. Alternatively, it has been suggested that she was the daughter of Béla and his second wife, Tuta of Formbach, and thereby a sister of King Ladislaus I of Hungary. Another alternative hypothesis makes her the daughter of Tuta and King Peter of Hungary, but that seems highly unlikely. Sophia had been betrothed to Margrave William of Meissen, but upon his early death in 1062 married his nephew Ulric instead. She gave her first husband four children:

- Poppo II (d. 1098), his successor as Margrave of Carniola, Margrave of Istria from 1096, married Richgard, daughter of Count Engelbert of Sponheim
- Ulric II (d. 1112), his brother's successor, married Adelaide, daughter of Landgrave Louis the Springer of Thuringia
- Richgard, married Count Eckhard I of Scheyern or his brother Count Otto II
- Adelaide, married firstly Frederick, Vogt of Regensburg, and secondly Udalschalk, Count in the Lurngau
- Walburga

On 31 July 1064, King Henry IV of Germany donated land in pago Histrie ... in comitatu Odalrici marchionis ('in the country of Istria ... in the county of Margrave Ulric') to prefato Odalrico marchioni ('the prefect Ulric, margrave'). Again on 5 March 1067, Henry donated land in pago Istria in marcha Odalrici marchionis ('in the country of Istria in the march of Margrave Ulric'), this time to the church in Freising. Ulric was recorded as Odalricus marchio Carentinorum ('Ulric, margrave of the Carinthians') on his death. A loyal supporter of the Imperial Salian dynasty and backed by his Hungarian brothers-in-law, Ulric was able to enlarge his margraviate down to Fiume, against the resistance of the Patriarchs of Aquileia and the Republic of Venice.

== Sources ==
- Paschini, Pio (1913). "Vicende del Friuli durante il dominio della casa imperiale di Franconia". Memorie storiche cividalesi: bulletino del R. Museo di (in Italian). Vol. 9. Presso la Societa Storica. pp. 176–206.

Preceded by Poppo I	Margrave of Carniola; 1045–1070	Succeeded by Poppo II
Preceded by Poppo I	Margrave of Istria; 1060–1070	Succeeded by Henry I
