= Otto II of Scheyern =

Count of Scheyern

Otto II, Count of Scheyern
- Died: 31 October 1120
- Noble family: House of Wittelsbach
- Spouse: Richardis of Carniola
- Father: Otto I, Count of Scheyern
- Mother: Either Haziga of Diessen or a daughter of Meginhardt of Reichersbeuern

Otto II of Scheyern (sometimes called Otto III) (died 31 October 1120) was a son of Otto I, Count of Scheyern. His mother can not be unambiguously assigned because Otto I was married with a daughter of Count Meginhardt of Reichersbeuern and later with Haziga of Diessen, the widow of Count Herman of Kastl.

== Life ==
He was Vogt of Freising and from 1116 also Vogt of Weihenstephan.

== Marriage and issue ==
Otto II may have been married to Richardis, the daughter of Ulric I, Margrave of Carniola. They had four children:

- Otto III (d. after 15 December 1130)
- Eckhard III (d. after 11 July 1183)
- Bernard II (d. c. 1135)
- an unnamed son
