= Otto I of Scheyern =

Count of Scheyern

Otto I, Count of Scheyern
- Born: c. 1020
- Died: before 4 December 1072 probably: Scheyern
- Noble family: House of Wittelsbach
- Spouses: A daughter of Meginhardt of Reichersbeuern; Haziga of Diessen
- Issue: Eckhard I Bernard I Otto II; Arnold I
- Father: Heinrich I, Count of Pegnitz
- Mother: unnamed daughter of Kuno I, Count of Altdorf

Otto I, Count of Scheyern (some authors call him Otto II of Scheyern; c. 1020 – before 4 December 1072) was the earliest known ancestor of the House of Wittelsbach whose relation with the House can be properly verified.

== Life ==
Most historians believe Otto was a younger son of Heinrich I, Count of Pegnitz and an unnamed daughter of Kuno I, Count of Altdorf. He was appointed Vogt of Freising in Bavaria. A document from 1073 calls him Comes de Skyrun, i.e. Count of Scheyern. Otto I died on December 4, 1072, while on a pilgrimage to Jerusalem.

== Marriage and children ==
Otto was married twice. His first wife was from Saxony but her given name has not been preserved. About 1057, he married Haziga of Diessen, daughter of Count Friedrich of Diessen.

Otto had 4 known children. By his first wife he had:

- Eckhard I.
- Bernard I, Count of Scheyern (d. 2 March abt. 1102).

By his second wife, Haziga, he had 2 children:

- Otto II (died 1 April, c. 1110).
- Arnold I, Count of Scheyern and Count of Dachau (died c. 1123).
