= Poppo II of Carniola =

11th Century Margrave of Carniola and Istria

Poppo II (died 1098), Count of Weimar-Orlamünde, was margrave of Carniola from 1070 and of Istria from 1096 to his death.

== Life ==
Poppo was the son of Margrave Ulric I of Carniola and Sophia of Hungary, daughter of King Béla I of Hungary. He succeeded his father upon his death in 1070.

Poppo married Richgard (lt: Richardis), daughter of Count Engelbert I, Margrave of Istria, who governed Istria until his death on 1 April 1096. According to the 1170 Historia Welforum chronicle, Poppo and Richgard had two daughters:

- Sophia of Istria (d. 1132), married Count Berthold II of Andechs, mother of Margrave Berthold I of Istria (1110 or 1122 – 1188)
- Hedwig, married firstly Count Herman I of Winzenburg and secondly Count Adalbert II of Bogen.

Poppo remained a loyal supporter of the Salian emperor Henry IV during the Investiture Controversy. Because of his lack of surviving sons, he was succeeded by his younger brother Ulric II.

== Sources ==
- Paschini, Pio (1913). "Vicende del Friuli durante il dominio della casa imperiale di Franconia". Memorie storiche cividalesi: bulletino del R. Museo di (in Italian). Vol. 9. Presso la Societa Storica. pp. 176–206.
- Štih, Peter (2010). The Middle Ages between the Eastern Alps and the Northern Adriatic. Brill.

Preceded by Ulric I	Margrave of Carniola; 1070–1098	Succeeded by Ulric II
Preceded by Burchard	Margrave of Istria; 1096–1098	Succeeded by Ulric II
