= Rižana =

Rižana Risano
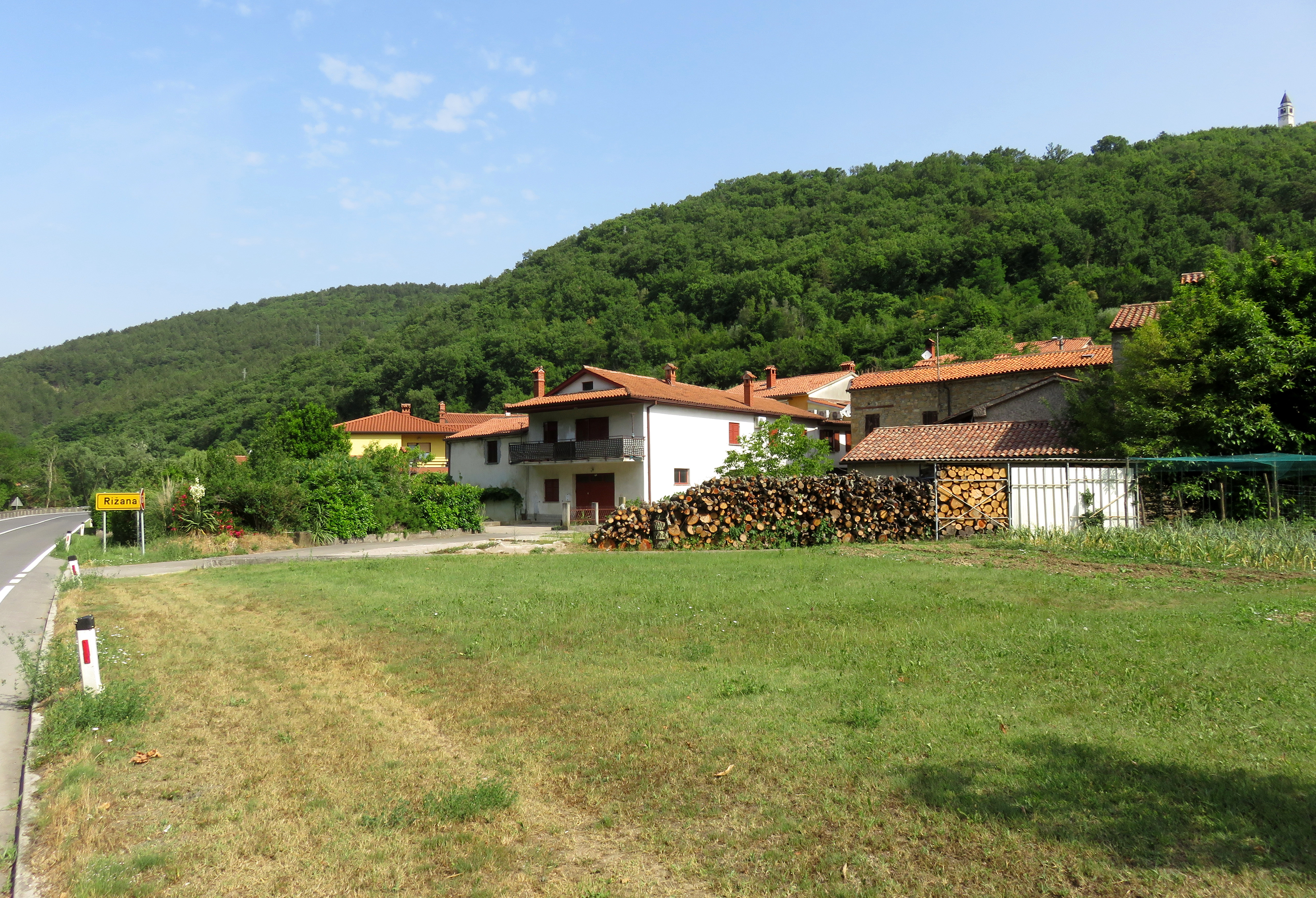

- Location in Slovenia
- Coordinates: 45°32′38.19″N 13°50′52.63″E
- Country: Slovenia
- Traditional region: Littoral
- Statistical region: Coastal–Karst
- Municipality: Koper

Area
  - Total: 1.96 km^{2} (0.76 sq mi)
- Elevation: 48.2 m (158 ft)

Population (2002)
  - Total: 107

Rižana (pronounced [ɾiˈʒaːna], Italian: Risano) is a settlement in the Istrian City Municipality of Koper in the Littoral region of Slovenia. It includes the hamlets of Bižaji, Paluzi, Santini, and Tinčki and is located on the Rižana River.

== Name ==
The name Rižana is originally a hydronym referring to the Rižana (Italian: Risano) River, which flows past the village.

== History ==
Rižana is usually considered to be the site of the important early medieval dispute known as the Plea of Rizana or Placitum of Riziano (Italian: Placito del Risano), which took place in 804.
