= Burchard of Istria =

Burchard II or Burkhard II, also Purcard, was the son of Burchard I of Moosburg and elder brother of Burchard III. He was created Margrave of Istria sometime before 1093, when he first appears in a charter of the Emperor Henry IV along with other nobles of his native land of Bavaria.

He was appointed vogt of Aquileia in 1101. He died between 1106 and 13 February 1107. He left by his wife Acica a daughter named Matilda. His son-in-law Conrad di Manzano exercised his authority in Aquileia after his death.
