= March of Istria =

Historical frontier county or march of Istria

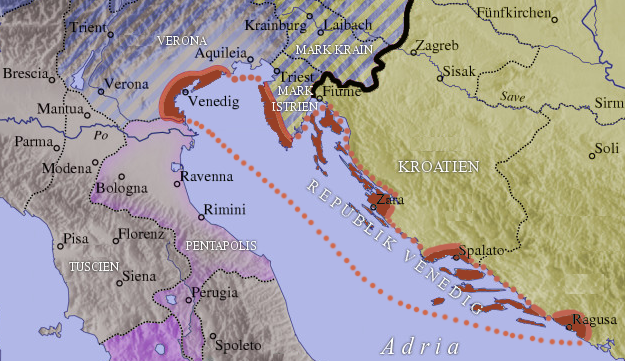
The Istrian march (Mark Istrien) of the Holy Roman Empire about 1000 AD, alongside the marches of Verona and Carniola (Krain), Croatia and the Republic of Venice

The March of Istria, or the Margraviate of Istria (German: Markgrafschaft Istrien) was a historical frontier county, or march centered on the Istrian peninsula. It was established after the Carolingian conquest at the end of the 8th century, and continued to exist in various territorial scopes and administrative forms within the Holy Roman Empire, consequently becoming integrated into the Austrian Kingdom of Illyria, and the Austrian Littoral. In time it lost its most western (coastal) regions, that became part of Venetian Istria, while the Istrian frontier county, or march was reduced to central and eastern parts of the Istrian peninsula. Those regions were reintegrated after 1797, and the reunited Istrian march was finally abolished in 1918.

== History ==
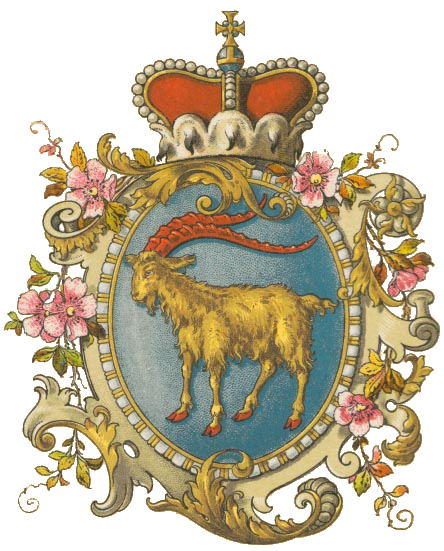
Coats of arms of the March of Istria

The settlement area of the ancient Histri tribes had been conquered by the Roman Empire in 178 BC and was incorporated into the northeastern Venetia et Histria region under Emperor Augustus. Upon the Decline of the Roman Empire and the Migration Period, the Lombards under King Alboin from 568 onwards conquered Venetia, where they established the Duchy of Friuli, part of their Kingdom of Italy. The Istrian peninsula remained under Byzantine (Eastern Roman) influence, while South Slavic tribes (Croatians and Slovenes) settled in the east and north.

Aistulf, King of the Lombards from 749, attacked the remaining Byzantine territories in Italy and even threatened the Byzantine Papacy in Rome. As Pope Zachary expected no help from Constantinople, he forged an alliance with Pepin the Short, the powerful Mayor of the Palace of the Frankish kingdom north of the Alps, whom he legitimized as King of the Franks. In 755, Pepin invaded Italy and forced Aistulf under Frankish suzerainty. Pepin's son Charlemagne in 773/774 finally incorporated the Italian kingdom into the Carolingian Empire.

=== Carolingian march ===
Charlemagne at first attached the Istrian peninsula to the Lombard Duchy of Friuli, part of the Carolingian Kingdom of Italy under his son Pepin. Though officially a duchy, Friuli de facto was a march with a merely titular ducal dignity, from 776 ruled by Frankish appointees.

An Istrian margraviate itself first emerged following the death of Duke Eric of Friuli in the 799 Siege of Trsat on the Frankish border with Littoral Croatia. Istria was enfeoffed to the Frankish count Hunfrid, who also bore the title of a dux Foroiulanus. The original Carolingian march stretched from the Julian Alps and the Karst Plateau down to the Gulf of Kvarner. It was one of three marches, along with Friuli and Carantania, guarding Italy from the Avars, Slavs, and Magyars successively. In the first decade of the 9th century, Istria was ruled by one Duke John, nominally according to its ancient Byzantine customs, but in fact as a Frankish vassal. The region then had nine cities, Trieste foremost among them.

After King Pepin had made several attempts to conquer Venice on the Adriatic coast, his father Emperor Charlemagne under the 812 Treaty of Aix-la-Chapelle finally recognised the formal Byzantine control over the city along with Istria, at least its western coast. After this, it falls into obscurity, but perhaps the Byzantines never succeeded in re-establishing their government in the returned territories, if they were actually handed over. The remaining parts of Istria were probably eventually just re-integrated into the Carolingian duchy of Friuli.

When after the deposition of the last Friulian duke Baldric, Emperor Louis the Pious at the 829 Reichstag in Worms divided his vast duchy into four marches. Istria with the March of Friuli was ruled from Aquileia by Margrave Eberhard and his Unruoching descendants. It became part of Middle Francia after the 843 Treaty of Verdun, and was allotted to Emperor Louis II's Italian kingdom in 855. The Unruoching margrave Berengar of Friuli even succeeded Charles the Fat as King of Italy in 888.

=== Imperial march ===
After the German king Otto I had campaigned northern Italy under Berengar's grandson King Berengar II, in 952 he merged Friuli into the vast March of Verona, which he granted to his brother Duke Henry I of Bavaria, who already controlled the adjacent Carinthian and Carniolan marches. After the deposition of Henry's son and successor Duke Henry the Wrangler in 976, Emperor Otto II separated Carinthia from the Bavaria as a duchy in its own right, ruled by Duke Henry the Younger who was also given suzerainty over the southeastern Bavarian marches, including Verona, Istria, Carniola and Styria.

There appear counts of Istria late in the 10th century, but Istria together with the March of Carniola was separated from the Carinthian duchy in 1040, when both were bestowed on the Thuringian Count Poppo of Weimar, heir by marriage to the last known Friulian margrave Weriand (Werigand (Friaul)). The Carniolan margraves gradually acquired the northeastern territories of the peninsula, while the western and southern coast was gradually occupied by the Republic of Venice. The German king Henry IV nominally assigned the remaining march to the Patriarchate of Aquileia, the margravial title and the Istrian territories were however retained by Carniola. In 1173 the Hohenstaufen Emperor Frederick Barbarossa enfeoffed the Bavarian noble House of Andechs, who attached Istria to their Duchy of Merania. Aquileia regained Istria in 1209, when the Andechs margraves were banned due to alleged entanglement in the assassination of the German king, Frederick Barbarossa's son Philip of Swabia.

By mid-century most of the Istrian coast had been conquered by Venice. The patriarchs had ceased appointing margraves and had given the remaining interior of the peninsula into the direct control of their Vogt officials, the Counts of Görz. The Görz territories were finally acquired by the Habsburg archdukes of Austria in 1374, who since 1335 had held the Carniolan march. In 1382 they also gained control over the City of Trieste.

=== Habsburg Margraviate ===
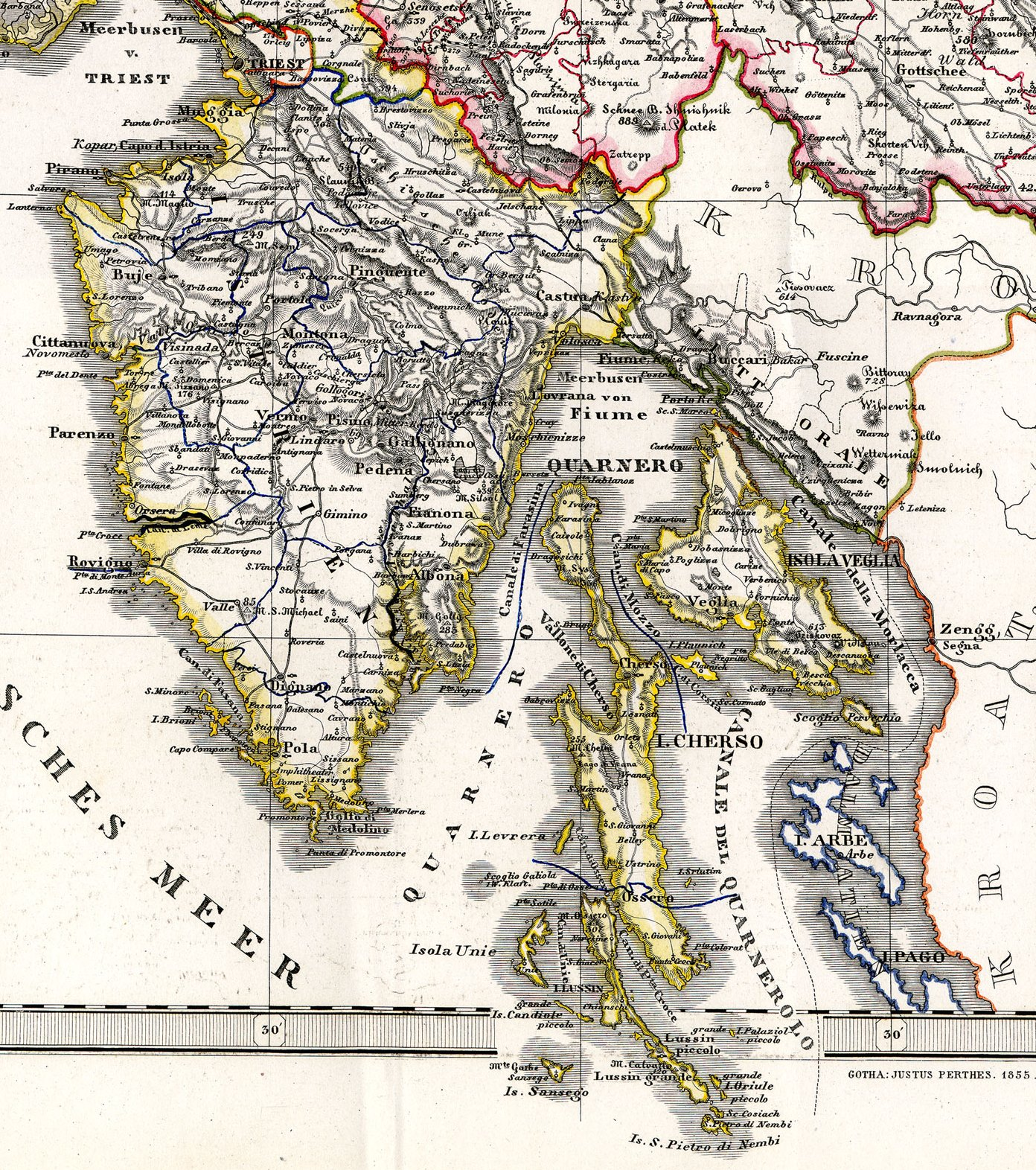
Margraviate of Istria during the late Austrian era, from 1849 to 1918

After the secular territory of the patriarchs of Aquileia had been completely conquered by Venice in 1420, most of Istria belonged to La Serenissima. The Austrian House of Habsburg only held a small territory in the interior of the peninsula around Pazin (Mitterburg), which it administered from its Carniolan duchy. The Habsburg rulers nevertheless added the title of a "Margrave of Istria" to their other titles, persisting until the dissolution of the Austro-Hungarian monarchy in 1918.

Venetian Istria fell to the Habsburg monarchy (the Austrian Empire after 1804) according to the 1797 Treaty of Campo Formio but was subsequently seized by Napoleon in the 1805 Peace of Pressburg, forming part of the Kingdom of Italy. It was then incorporated into the French Empire as part of the Illyrian Provinces in 1809. In 1815, after Napoleon had been defeated, the territory was returned to Austria as part of the Kingdom of Illyria by the 1815 Congress of Vienna.

After the partition of the Illyrian kingdom in 1849, the Margravate of Istria became a subdivision of the Austrian Littoral crown land. It received considerable autonomy as a crown land in its own right with the establishment of the Diet of Istria at Parenzo by the 1861 February Patent.

== Margraves ==
=== Carolingian March of Istria ===
- Hunfrid (c. 799), also Duke of Friuli
- John (c. 804), Duke

=== Margraviate re-established (held by the Counts of Weimar) ===
- Poppo I (1012–1044), also Margrave of Carniola from 1040
- Ulric I (1060–1070), son of Margrave Poppo I, also Margrave of Carniola
- Henry I (1077–1090)

=== House of Sponheim ===
- Engelbert I (1090–1093)
- Burchard (1093–1096)

=== Counts of Weimar-Orlamünde ===
- Poppo II (1096–1098), son of Ulric I, Margrave of Carniola since 1070
- Ulric II (1098–1107), brother, also Margrave of Carniola

=== House of Sponheim ===
- Engelbert II (1107–1124), son of Engelbert I, also Margrave of Carniola, Duke of Carinthia from 1124
- Engelbert III 1124–1173, son, also Margrave of Carniola

=== House of Andechs ===
- Berthold I (1173–1188), also Margrave of Carniola
- Berthold II (1188–1204), son, also Margrave of Carniola, Duke of Merania (as Berthold IV) since 1183
- Henry II (1204–1228), son, also Margrave of Carniola
- Otto I (1228–1234), brother, also Margrave of Carniola, Duke of Merania since 1204, Count Palatine of Burgundy since 1211 (as Otto II)
- Otto II (1234–1248), also Margrave of Carniola, Duke of Merania and Count Palatine of Burgundy (as Otto III)

The title was held afterwards by the Habsburg monarch and the "Margrave of Istria" was included in the grand title of the Emperor of Austria.

== See also ==
- Istria
- History of Istria
- Venetian Istria
- Austrian Kingdom of Illyria
- Austrian Littoral

== Sources ==
- Bowlus, Charles R. (1995). Franks, Moravians, and Magyars: The Struggle for the Middle Danube, 788-907. Philadelphia: University of Pennsylvania Press.
- Curta, Florin (2006). Southeastern Europe in the Middle Ages, 500–1250. Cambridge: Cambridge University Press.
- Dursteler, Eric, ed. (2013). A Companion to Venetian History, 1400-1797. Leiden-Boston: Brill.
- Fine, John Van Antwerp Jr. (1991) [1983]. The Early Medieval Balkans: A Critical Survey from the Sixth to the Late Twelfth Century. Ann Arbor, Michigan: University of Michigan Press.
- Krahwinkler, Harald (2005). "Patriarch Fortunatus of Grado and the Placitum of Riziano" (PDF). Acta Histriae. 13 (1): 63–78.
- Goldberg, Eric J. (2006). Struggle for Empire: Kingship and Conflict under Louis the German, 817-876. Ithaca, NY: Cornell University Press.
- Luthar, Oto, ed. (2008). The Land Between: A History of Slovenia. Frankfurt am Main: Peter Lang.
- McKitterick, Rosamond (1983). The Frankish Kingdoms Under the Carolingians, 751-987. Harlow: Longman.
- MacLean, Simon (2003). Kingship and Politics in the Late Ninth Century: Charles the Fat and the end of the Carolingian Empire. New York: Cambridge University Press.
- Reuter, Timothy (2013) [1991]. Germany in the Early Middle Ages c. 800–1056. London and New York: Routledge.
- Schmidt, Ondřej (2019). John of Moravia between the Czech Lands and the Patriarchate of Aquileia (ca. 1345–1394). Leiden-Boston: Brill.
- Vicelja-Matijašić, Marina (2005). "Byzantium and Istria: Some Aspects of Byzantine Presence in Istria" (PDF). Acta Histriae. 13 (1): 185–204.
- Wickham, Chris (1981). Early Medieval Italy: Central Power and Local Society, 400-1000. Totowa, NJ: Barnes & Noble.
