= August Dimitz =

Slovene lawyer and historian (1827–1886)

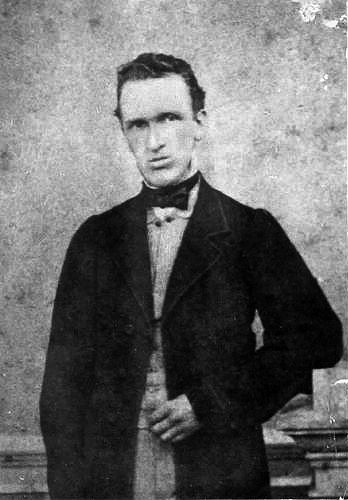
- Born: August 16, 1827; Ljubljana, Austrian Empire (now Slovenia)
- Died: December 10, 1886 (aged 59); Ljubljana, Austria-Hungary (now Slovenia)
- Occupations: Lawyer, historian

August Dimitz (Slovenized: Avgust Dimitz, earlier also Avgust Dimic; August 16, 1827 – December 10, 1886) was a Slovenian lawyer and historian.

Dimitz was born in Ljubljana. He completed high school in Ljubljana and studied law in Vienna (1845–1850), and he then returned to Ljubljana, where he joined the financial service and became head of financial management in 1884. In 1858 he became the secretary of the Historical Society for Carniola (founded in 1843), holding this position for more than 20 years. From 1859 to 1868 he edited Mittheilungen des historischen Vereins für Krain (Journal of the Historical Society for Carniola). Although he considered himself an ethnic Slovene, he associated with German-speaking society. In the German newspapers of the time in Ljubljana, he published articles on political, cultural, and church events, articles on local history, biographical information, and some articles on Slovene literary history. He studied archaeological issues and the state of rural archives. At the request of the crown land of Carniola, he published a celebratory work, Die Habsburger in Krain (The Habsburgs in Carniola), to mark the 600th anniversary of the unification of Carniola with Austria. The work was also published in Slovene in a translation by Josip Cimperman. Dimitz's most important work is Geschichte Krains von der ältesten Zeit bis auf das Jahr 1813 (The History of Carniola from the Earliest Times up to 1813), published in 12 volumes from 1874 to 1876. In it, he discussed in detail the peasant revolts, the Ottoman invasions, and the Reformation, and he also dealt in detail with the beginnings of Slovene literature.

Dimitz died in Ljubljana in 1886 at the age of 59.
