= March of Carniola =

Medieval State in the Holy Roman Empire

March of Carniola Kranjska krajina (Slovene) Markgrafschaft Krain (German)
- before 973–1364
- Flag Coat of arms

- March of Carniola at the time of the Hohenstaufen emperors (circa 1250) The pale highlighted area roughly corresponds to the later Austrian Circle and is shown merely for context
- Status: State (march) of the Holy Roman Empire
- Capital: Kranj (Krainburg) (Stein) = Kamnik (Laibach) = Ljubljana
- Government: Margraviate
- Margrave
  - 1040–1043 (first): Poppo I
  - 1358–1364 (last): Rudolf IV of Austria
- Historical era: High Middle Ages
  - Separated from Bavaria (as part of the Duchy of Carinthia): 976
  - Margraviate established: before 973
  - Inherited by King Ottokar II of Bohemia (thus uniting it with Austria and Styria): 1268
  - Seized by House of Habsburg: 1276
  - Declared a duchy by Duke Rudolf IV of Austria: 1364
  - Status as duchy recognised: 1590
| Preceded by | Succeeded by |
| Duchy of Carinthia | Duchy of Carniola |
- Today part of: Slovenia Croatia Italy

The March of Carniola (Kranjska krajina (Slovene); Markgrafschaft Krain (German)) was a southeastern frontier district (march, or margraviate) of the Carolingian Empire, and a state of the Holy Roman Empire, centered in the region of Carniola (in modern Slovenia). The region came under Carolingian influence in 788, being gradually organized as a county, that was originally placed under Friulian jurisdiction (828), but later transferred to East Francia and reorganized into a frontier march. In the middle of the 10th century, it was under the jurisdiction of the Duchy of Bavaria, but in 976 it was placed under the jurisdiction of the newly created Duchy of Carinthia. At the time of its creation, the march served as a frontier defense against the Kingdoms of Hungary and Croatia. The March of Carniola was later transformed into the Duchy of Carniola (1364).

== History ==
Carniolan march within the Duchy of Carinthia, circa 1000 CE

Since the pre-Roman times, a tribe called Carni lived in the Eastern Alps, including regions around the upper Sava and the Soča rivers. Those lands were thus called Carnia by later Latin writers, or Carniola (meaning: "little Carnia", as part of greater Carnia). Since the end of the 6th century, the region was settled by Slavs, who were subjected to the Avars, and to the west they were neighbors to the Lombards. Thus in time a new Slavic name emerged, derived from the term krajina (meaning: the frontier land), and later evolving into Kranjska.

Since the Carolingian conquest and pacification of the Lombard Kingdom in 774-776, the Duchy of Friuli became the base for further expansion towards Slavic lands to the east. From 788 to 828, jurisdiction of Friulian dukes extended towards Carniola and beyond. In 828, the jurisdiction over those eastern regions, including Carniola, was transferred to governors of Bavaria, and in 843 all of those lands were included into the East Francia.

=== Foundation ===
The frontier county or march of Carniola on the eastern slope of the Julian Alps probably dates back to the late ninth century, when it was formed alongside the marches of Carinthia, Istria, and Pannonia and was especially susceptible to Magyar raids. In 952, Carniola was placed under the authority of the Dukes of Bavaria, as were Carinthia, Istria, and Friuli.

First explicit mention of the frontier county or march of Carniola dates from 973, when it was recorded in an imperial charter, that included donation of various possessions, including those in the county of count Popo, that is called Carniola, and also referred to in common speech as the march of Krajina (lat. in comitatu Poponis comitis quod Carniola vocatur et quod vulgo Creina marcha appellatur).

In 976, Emperor Otto II deposed the rebellious Bavarian duke Henry the Wrangler and ceded the duchy to his nephew Otto of Swabia. In turn, he separated the southeastern marches from the Bavarian duchy and elevated Carinthia to a duchy in its own right. Henry the Younger, a member of the Bavarian Luitpolding dynasty, was appointed first duke and acted as a sort of "chief of the border police", controlling the Carniolan march, the March of Styria, the Mark an der Drau and Mark an der Sann, as well as the vast March of Verona with Friuli and Istria.

In 1040, King Henry III of Germany separated Carniola from the Duchy of Carinthia and granted the Windic March (later Lower Carniola) to the former. The reason for the split was partly military considerations and partly the innate distinctness of the region, whose pattern of German colonisation differed from that of Carinthia proper north of the Karawanks. Carniola had been additionally settled mostly by Bavarians with a minority of Swabians and retained its Slovene culture while most of Carinthia adopted German culture. The most prominent Bavarian families were the Hoflein, Stein, Hertenberg, Reydeck, and Rabensberg, while the Swabian families of the Auersperg, Osterberg, and Gallenberg were also represented.

Initially, the margraviate was bordered by Carinthia and Styria (elevated to a duchy in 1156) to the north, the Croatia and Slavonia to the east, Istria and Dalmatia to the south, and Friuli, Gorizia, Udine and Gradisca to the west. The Carniolan lands were bound informally to the other marches of the southeast of the Empire in what has been termed the "Austrian complex" because of the supremacy which Austria quickly obtained over the others and the way in which they tended to follow her. Due to this informal cohesion, Carniola was more like a geographical part than a whole and it was often combined to its neighbours and granted out as payment for electoral support. Nevertheless, its status as the most southeasterly of the marches helped it retain its marcher privileges well into the thirteenth century and long after the other regions, especially Friuli, had lost theirs.

=== Patriarchal rule ===
On 11 June 1077, Carniola and Istria were transferred by King Henry IV of Germany to the powerful patriarchs of Aquileia. Nevertheless, secular margraves were still appointed and the territory was administered as a separate province. After the extinction of the Thuringian counts of Weimar upon the death of Margrave Ulric II in 1112 (he may have resigned his march in 1107 or 1108), the patriarchate took over the governing of the territory, against the resistance of the Rhenish House of Sponheim, dukes of Carinthia from 1122. The Patriarchs partitioned the territory between several powerful fiefs, the most prominent of which were the Bavarian counts of Andechs (later dukes of Merania), the Meinhardiner dynasty of Gorizia (Görz), and the Counts of Celje.

In the twelfth century, the Republic of Venice gradually acquired the Istrian littoral and Carniola took control of what remained of the Istrian march around Pazin (Mitterburg). Soon Carniola extended over the Karst Plateau and had two small seacoasts on the Gulf of Trieste and the Gulf of Kvarner. It reached to the Friulian Isonzo valley, but not the river itself. This change in its geographical constitution was accompanied by increased interest on the part of nearby landlocked powers. In 1245, Patriarch Berthold gave Carniola to the Babenberg duke Frederick II of Austria, husband of Agnes of Merania, with royal consent.

=== Bohemian rule ===
Around 1254, Carniola lost its marcher privileges. When Duke Frederick II of Austria died without male heirs in 1246, Carniola was given to the last Sponheim duke Ulric III of Carinthia, a cousin of the patriarch who married Frederick's widow Agnes. Ulric developed Carniola, endowing many lands to the church and establishing a mint at Kostanjevica. As he himself left no heirs, he willed his lands to his cousin, the Přemyslid king Ottokar II of Bohemia in 1268. Ottokar likewise had acquired the princeless Duchy of Austria with Styria, and upon Ulric's death in 1269 he united Carinthia and Carniola to his Crown.

In 1273 Ottokar became embroiled in a dispute with the Swabian count Rudolf of Habsburg over his election as King of the Romans. The next year Rudolf and the Imperial Diet of Nuremberg demanded that all fiefs acquired during the interregnum after the death of Emperor Frederick II of Hohenstaufen in 1250 were to revert to the Imperial crown, a demand which would have applied to Austria, Carinthia and Carniola. Ottokar refused, but was eventually put under Imperial ban in 1276 and forced to cede the lands, only retaining his Kingdom of Bohemia with Moravia. Two years later he was defeated and killed in the Battle on the Marchfeld. Under Habsburg rule, Carniola became a frontier against Venice in the southwest, while its eastern border with Hungary remained stable.

=== Austrian rule ===
Rudolph enfeoffed Carniola to his sons Albert and Rudolf II in 1282 after a meeting in Augsburg, but instead he leased the margraviate to his ally Count Meinhard of Tyrol, whom he appointed Duke of Carinthia from 1286. It remained with the Meinhardiner dynasty until Meinard's son, Duke Henry VI of Carinthia, died in 1335. The Luxembourg king John I of Bohemia renounced his rights of inheritance and the Habsburg dukes Otto and Albert II of Austria gained Carniola despite a former agreement the late Duke Henry had made with Emperor Louis the Bavarian, whereby his daughters Adelaide and Margaret of Tyrol would inherit his lands.

Albert's son Duke Rudolf IV of Austria declared Carniola a Duchy in 1364, although like his claiming of the title of "Archduke of Austria" by the Privilegium Maius, such an elevation was beyond his jurisdiction. The ducal title was not confirmed until much later: this time 1590. By the 1379 Treaty of Neuberg, Carniola was attached to the Inner Austrian possessions of the Habsburg Leopoldian line.

== List of margraves ==
- Winther († after 12 March 933)
- Udalrich von Ebersberg, 1011–1029
- Eberhard II von Ebersberg, 1040
- Poppo I, 1040–1044, Count of Weimar, also Margrave of Istria since 1012
- Ulric I, 1045–1070, son, Count of Weimar, also Margrave of Istria from 1060
- Poppo II, 1070–1098, son, also Margrave of Istria from 1096
  - Ulric II, 1098–1107, brother, Count of Weimar, also Margrave of Istria

House of Sponheim

- Engelbert I, 1107–1124, also Margrave of Istria, Duke of Carinthia from 1122
- Engelbert II, 1124–1173, son, also Margrave of Istria

House of Andechs

- Berthold I, 1173–1188, also Margrave of Istria
- Berthold II, 1188–1204, also Duke of Merania
- Henry, 1204–1228
- Otto I, 1228–1234
- Otto II, 1234–1248

House of Babenberg

- Frederick II the Warlike, 1245–1246, Duke of Austria and Styria since 1230

House of Sponheim

- Ulric III, 1248–1269, also Duke of Carinthia from 1256

Přemyslid dynasty

- Ottokar II, 1269–1276, King of Bohemia, also Duke of Austria, Styria and Carinthia

House of Habsburg

- Rudolph, 1276–1286, German king (King of the Romans) since 1273, also Duke of Austria, Styria and Carinthia until 1282

House of Gorizia

- Meinhard, 1286–1295, Count of Tyrol since 1258, also Duke of Carinthia
- Henry, 1295–1335, son, also King of Bohemia 1306 and 1307–10, Duke of Carinthia and Count of Tyrol

House of Habsburg

- Albert II, 1335–1358, grandson of King Rudolph, Duke of Austria and Styria since 1330, also Duke of Carinthia
- Rudolph IV, 1358–1364, son, also Duke of Austria, Styria and Carinthia, Count of Tyrol from 1363

declared himself "Duke of Carniola" in 1364.

== Sources ==
- Bowlus, Charles R. (1995). Franks, Moravians, and Magyars: The Struggle for the Middle Danube, 788-907. Philadelphia: University of Pennsylvania Press.
- Curta, Florin (2006). Southeastern Europe in the Middle Ages, 500–1250. Cambridge: Cambridge University Press.
- Fine, John Van Antwerp Jr. (1991) [1983]. The Early Medieval Balkans: A Critical Survey from the Sixth to the Late Twelfth Century. Ann Arbor, Michigan: University of Michigan Press.
- Goldberg, Eric J. (2006). Struggle for Empire: Kingship and Conflict under Louis the German, 817-876. Ithaca, NY: Cornell University Press.
- Luthar, Oto, ed. (2008). The Land Between: A History of Slovenia. Frankfurt am Main: Peter Lang.
- McKitterick, Rosamond (1983). The Frankish Kingdoms Under the Carolingians, 751-987. Harlow: Longman.
- MacLean, Simon (2003). Kingship and Politics in the Late Ninth Century: Charles the Fat and the end of the Carolingian Empire. New York: Cambridge University Press.
- Reuter, Timothy (2013) [1991]. Germany in the Early Middle Ages c. 800–1056. London and New York: Routledge.
- Semple, Ellen Churchill (1915). "The Barrier Boundary of the Mediterranean Basin and Its Northern Breaches as Factors in History". Annals of the Association of American Geographers. 5: 27–59. doi:10.1080/00045601509357037. hdl:2027/uc2.ark:/13960/t2c825k1f.
- Schutz, Herbert (2004). The Carolingians in Central Europe, Their History, Arts, and Architecture: A Cultural History of Central Europe, 750-900. Leiden-Boston: Brill.
- Thompson, James Westfall. Feudal Germany, 2. Ungar, 1969.
- Wickham, Chris (1981). Early Medieval Italy: Central Power and Local Society, 400-1000. Totowa, NJ: Barnes & Noble.
