= Scheyern =

- Municipality
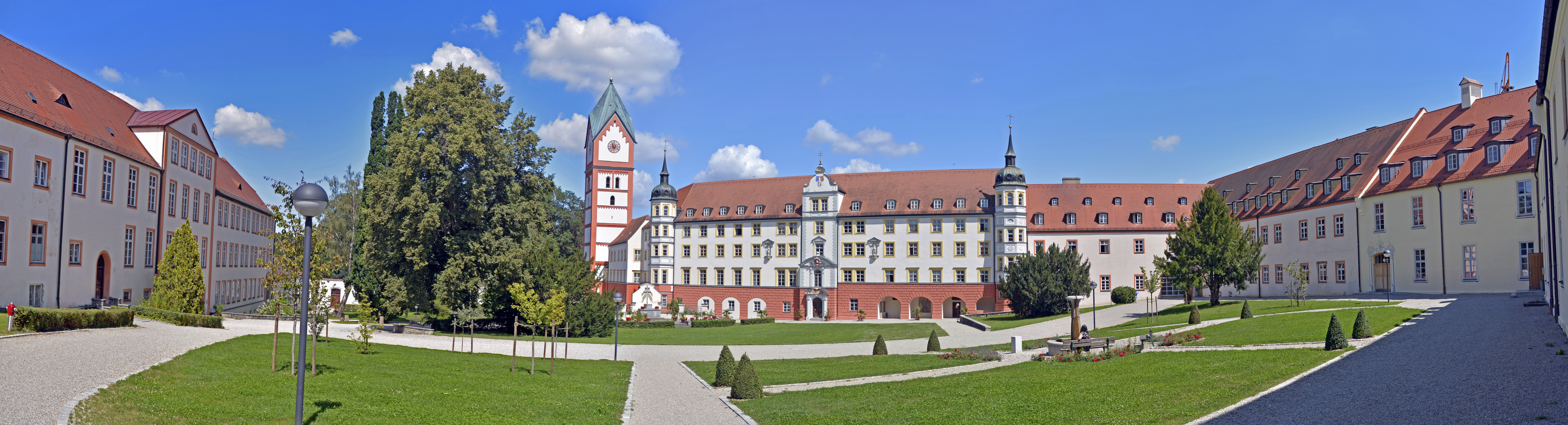
- Scheyern Abbey

- Coat of arms

- Location of Scheyern within Pfaffenhofen an der Ilm district
- Interactive map of Scheyern
- Location within Germany Location within Bavaria
- Coordinates: 48°30′N 11°28′E
- Country: Germany
- State: Bavaria
- Admin. region: Oberbayern
- District: Pfaffenhofen an der Ilm

Government
  - Mayor (2020–26): Manfred Sterz (FW)

Area
  - Total: 38.29 km^{2} (14.78 sq mi)
- Elevation: 479 m (1,572 ft)

Population (2025-12-31)
  - Total: 4,883
  - Density: 127.5/km^{2} (330.3/sq mi)
- Time zone: UTC+01:00 (CET)
  - Summer (DST): UTC+02:00 (CEST)
- Postal codes: 85298
- Dialling codes: 08441
- Vehicle registration: PAF
- Website: www.scheyern.de

Scheyern (German pronunciation: [ˈʃaɪɐn]) is a municipality in the district of Pfaffenhofen in Bavaria in Germany. The Scheyern Abbey is located in Scheyern.

The title the counts of Scheyern originated here (see House of Wittelsbach).

The village of Fernhag lies just outside the town.
