= Seeon =

Seeon may refer to:

- Seeon-Seebruck, a municipality in the district of Traunstein in southern Bavaria in Germany
- Seeon Abbey (Kloster Seeon), a monastery in the municipality of Seeon-Seebruck
