= Eichstock =

Village in Germany

Coordinates: 48°23′49″N 11°21′36″E

Eichstock is a village in the community of Markt Indersdorf, in the county of Dachau, in Bavaria in Germany.

== Geography ==
Eichstock is located on a high hill overlooking the villages of Stangenried, Kleinschwabhausen, Wengenhausen and Ainhofen. The village consists of a few houses and barns overlooking large tracks of agricultural fields and a forest to the south.

== History ==
Eichstock is first mentioned by name in 1305 with the geographical name 'Aychstoechinne'. In 1345 a small settlement was first mentioned by the name of 'Aychstok' or 'Aychstock' (German: Eichwald, forest of oak trees). It was as extension of the community of Kranzberg.

By 1783 it became part of the church lands of Indersdorf, (respectively the monastery at Indersdorf).

The village began to be settled by the Protestant Mennonite community in the early 19th century, especially after the policy of religious toleration by prince-elector Maximillian Joseph in 1803, (Maximillian would later become King of Bavaria in 1806).

== Mennonite Community and Prayer House ==
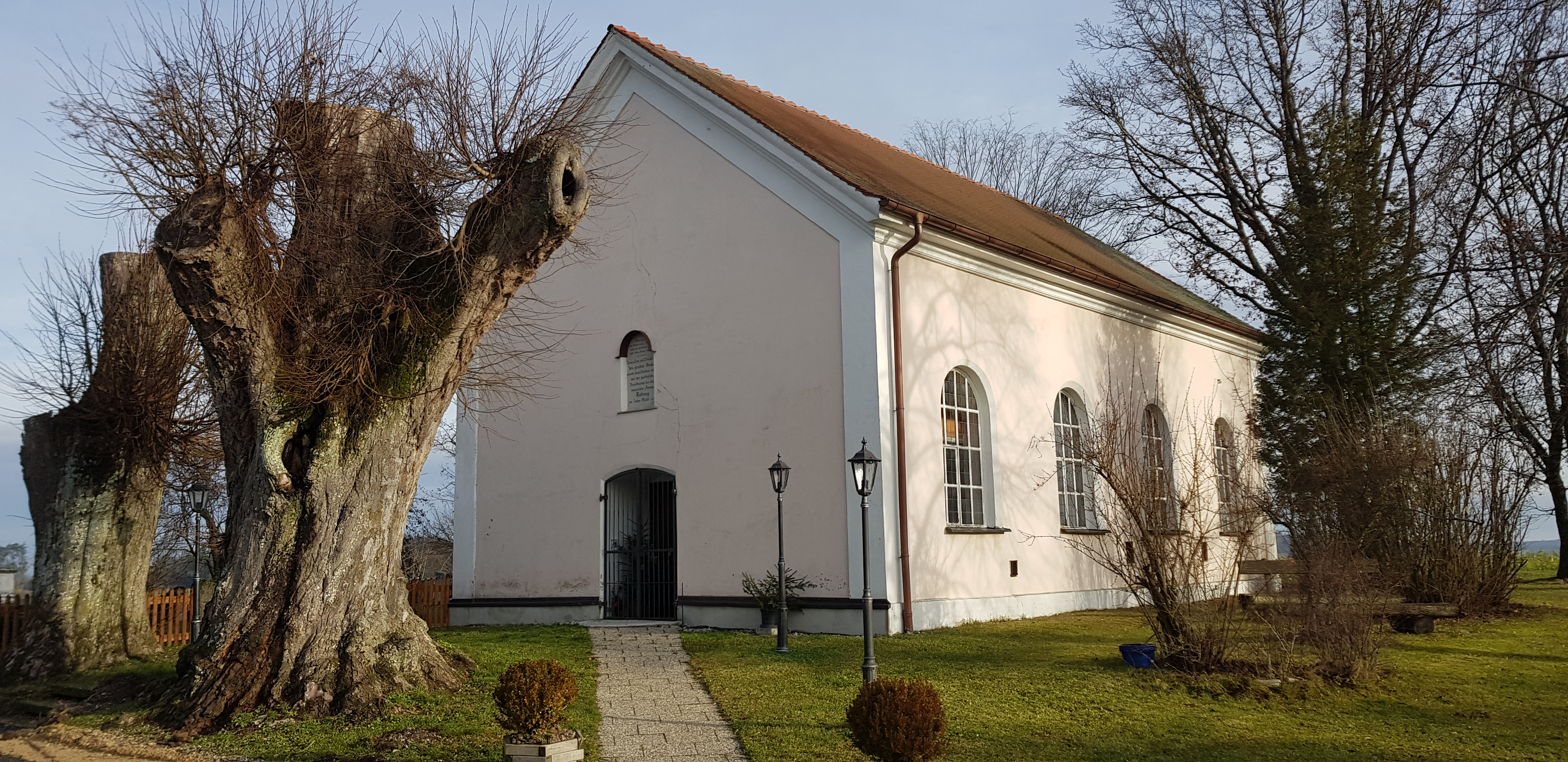
Historical Prayer House in Eichstock. The two linden trees near the front entrance were planted shortly after the Bethaus was completed in the early 1840s and survive to this day.

By 1818 more Mennonites began to settle in Eichstock. Many of them came from the Bavarian Palatine area, (today Rhineland-Pfalz). They also settled in nearby villages around Indersdorf and Petershausen: such as Wagenried, Stachusried, Lanzenried, Riedhof, Rettenbach, Harreszell, Goppertshof, Tafern, Fränking and Kleinschwabhausen.

By 1841 permission was granted by King Ludwig I to build a small prayer house in Eichstock, as well as a cemetery. The Mennonites had earlier assembled and prayed in their homes. It took about five and a half months to build the new prayer house, (German: Bethaus). The first church service took place on November 14th, 1841. The interior and exterior of the prayer house is simple and modest, with no particular decorations or artwork, conforming to Mennonite teaching. A plaque hangs above the front entrance describing King Ludwigs I's 1841 permission to build the prayer house. One of the first preachers at the Mennonite church in Eichstock were the Ruth Brothers (Johann and David) and Elias Dettweiler (1791-1855).

By 1844, because of various economic and political challenges in Bavaria, many of the Mennonites left Eichstock and emigrated to the USA and settled in Halstead, Kansas, (a prairie wilderness at the time), where they believed they could expand and prosper there.

Due to emigration through the years, the church declined in attendance, especially in the 1920s. Only with the arrival of young families after the Second World War was an active community able to develop again. By 1967 the community had built a retreat house with guest rooms and a large hall near the old prayer house.

Through the years, other non-denominational Christian groups have worked with the Mennonite church. A Royal Ranger Christian scouting program is also active in Eichstock.

In 2016 the Community of Eichstock celebrated its 175th anniversary of the building of the prayer house.

In March 2022, due to small number of members, the local Mennonite church in Eichstock decided to merge with the Free Evangelical Church in Markt Indersdorf. The same year one of the oldest buildings in Eichstock began renovations for historical protection.

The restoration of the historical Bethaus took over two years. During that time, a 'time capsule' was buried in concrete underneath the threshold of the building. The first services were held in early July 2024. An inauguration festival took place for the public in late April/early May 2025 which included concerts, bible seminar, market tents, children's activities and a historical tour of the old Mennonite prayer chapel.

== Literature ==
- Hermann Dettweiler: Art. Eichstock, in: Mennonitisches Lexikon Bd. 1 (1913/24), S. 534f.
- Otto Hefele, Gerhard Becker: Chronik Ainhofen. Reichertshausen, Neuried, 2006; unveröffentlicht.
- Kirche der Mennonitengemeinde Eichstock: Im Namen des Königs. 150 Jahre 1841-1991. Eichstock 1991
- Wilhelm Liebhardt, Günther Pölsterl: Die Gemeinden des Landkreises Dachau. Dachau 1992. ISBN 3-89251-053-9.
- Richard Ringenberg: Familienbuch der Mennonitengemeinde Eichstock, München 1942
