= Heilika of Lengenfeld =

Countess Palatine of Bavaria by marriage

Heilika of Pettendorf-Lengenfeld
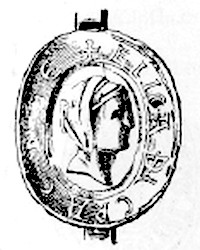
- Miniature seal of Heilika of Pettendorf-Lengenfeld
- Born: c. 1103
- Died: 14 September 1170
- Buried: Ensdorf Abbey
- Noble family: Pettendorf
- Spouse: Otto IV, Count of Wittelsbach
- Issue: Otto; Conrad; Frederick; Udalrich; Otto; Hedwig; Adelheid
- Father: Frederick III of Pettendorf
- Mother: Heilika of Swabia

Heilika of Pettendorf-Lengenfeld (also known as Eilika; c. 1103 – 14 September 1170; buried in Ensdorf Abbey) was by marriage Countess Palatine of Bavaria.

She was one of the two daughters of the edelfrei Lord Frederick III of Pettendorf-Lengenfeld-Hopfenohe, who died between 1112 and 1119 without a male heir. Her mother was a Heilika of Swabia the daughter of Duke Frederick I of Swabia and his wife, Agnes of Germany. As such, she was a granddaughter of Emperor Henry IV.

She married Count Otto IV of Wittelsbach (d. 1156), the Count Palatine of Bavaria. In 1124, he moved his residence from Scheyern Castle to Wittelsbach Castle in Aichach. He donated Scheyern Castle to the Benedictine Order, who turned it into a monastery.

Otto and Heilika had eight children:

1. Herman
2. Otto, nicknamed "the Redhead" (c. 1117–1183), succeeded his father as Count Otto VIII of Scheyern, Count Otto V of Wittelsbach and Count Palatine Otto VI of Bavaria. In 1180, after the fall of Henry the Lion, Emperor Frederick I "Barbarossa" enfeoffed Otto the Redhead with the Duchy of Bavaria. From then on, he called himself Otto I of Bavaria. The Wittelsbach dynasty would retain the duchy from 1180 until 1918.
3. Conrad, Archbishop of Mainz as Conrad III and Archbishop of Salzburg as Conrad I
4. Frederick II, (d. 1198 or 1199), married in 1184 to a daughter of Count Mangold of Donauwörth
5. Udalrich (d. 29 May 1179)
6. Otto VII (d. 1189), married Benedicta, also a daughter of Count Mangold of Donauwörth
7. Hedwig (c. 1117 – 16 July 1174), married in 1135 to Count Berthold (c. 1112 – 14 December 1188), who in 1151 became Duke Berthold III of Merania, Margrave Berthold I of Istria and Count Berthold III of Andechs. In 1157, he also became Count of Dießen-Wolfratshausen.
8. Adelaide, married Otto II of Stefling

Heilika's sister Heilwig was married to Count Gebhard I of Leuchtenberg and brought the Lordship of Waldeck into the marriage.

Heilika died on 14 September 1170 and was buried in Ensdorf Abbey.
