= Otto IV (disambiguation) =

Otto IV may refer to:

- Otto IV, Count of Wittelsbach (c. 1083 – 1156)
- Otto IV, Holy Roman Emperor (1175–1218)
- Otto IV, Count of Ravensberg (c. 1276–1328)
- Otto IV, Count of Burgundy (1248–1302)
- Otto IV, Margrave of Brandenburg-Stendal (c. 1238 – 1308 or 1309)
- Otto IV, the Merry (1301–1339), Duke of Austria
- Otto IV, Duke of Lower Bavaria (1307–1334)
- Otto IV, Prince of Anhalt-Bernburg (d. 1415)
- Otto IV, Duke of Brunswick-Lüneburg or Otto the Lame (d. 1446), Prince of Lüneburg
- Otto IV, Count of Waldeck (c. 1440–1494), of Landau
- Otto IV, Count of Rietberg (d. 1553)
- Otto IV of Schaumburg (1517–1576)

== See also ==
- Otto I (disambiguation)
- Otto II (disambiguation)
- Otto III (disambiguation)
- Otto V (disambiguation)
- Otto VI (disambiguation)
- Otto VII (disambiguation)
- Otto VIII (disambiguation)
