= Otto I (disambiguation) =

Otto I (912–973), known as Otto the Great, was German king from 936 and Holy Roman Emperor from 962 to 973.

Otto I may also refer to:

- Otto I, Duke of Saxony or Otto the Illustrious (died 912)
- Otto I, Count of Chiny (died 987)
- Otto I, Duke of Carinthia or Otto of Worms (c. 950–1004)
- Otto I, Duke of Swabia and Bavaria (955–982)
- Otto I, Marquess of Montferrat (died 991)
- Otto I, Count of Savoy (1023–1057/1060)
- Otto I, Count of Duras (fl. 1065)
- Otto I, Margrave of Meissen (died 1067)
- Otto I, Count of Scheyern (died 1072)
- Otto I, Count of Scheyern-Dachau-Valley (fl. 1124)
- Otto I, Count of Salm (died 1150), co-ruler of the County Palatine of the Rhine
- Otto I (bishop of Freising) (c. 1114–1158)
- Otto I, Duke of Bavaria or Otto the Redhead (1117–1183)
- Otto I, Margrave of Brandenburg (c. 1128–1184)
- Otto I, Count of Guelders and Zutphen (1150–1207)
- Otto I, Count of Burgundy (c. 1170–1200), Count of Luxembourg
- Otto I, Duke of Merania (1180–1234)
- Otto I (bishop of Utrecht) or Otto van Gelre (1194–1215)
- Otto I, Count of Oldenburg (died 1251)
- Otto I, Duke of Brunswick-Lüneburg or Otto the Child (1204–1252)
- Otto I, Count of Nassau (c. 1247–1290)
- Otto I, Prince of Anhalt-Aschersleben (died 1304)
- Otto I, Landgrave of Hesse (c. 1272–1328)
- Otto I, Duke of Pomerania (1279–1344), Duke of Stettin
- Otto I, Count of Schwerin (died 1357)
- Otto I, Margrave of Hachberg-Sausenberg (1302–1384), also Margrave of Rötteln
- Otto I, Duke of Brunswick-Göttingen or Otto the Evil (died 1394)
- Otto I, Count Palatine of Mosbach (1390–1461)
- Otto I, Duke of Brunswick-Harburg (1495–1549), Prince of Lüneburg
- Otto of Greece (1815–1867)
- Otto, King of Bavaria (1848–1916)
- Otto I of Austria or Otto von Habsburg (1912–2011), Crown Prince of Austria-Hungary

== See also ==
- Otto II (disambiguation)
- Otto III (disambiguation)
- Otto IV (disambiguation)
- Otto V (disambiguation)
- Otto VI (disambiguation)
- Otto VII (disambiguation)
- Otto VIII (disambiguation)
