= Otto III (disambiguation) =

Otto III, Holy Roman Emperor (980–1002) was Holy Roman Emperor from 996 until his death.

Otto III may also refer to:

- Otto III, Duke of Swabia (died 1057)
- Otto III, Count Palatine of Burgundy (1208–1248)
- Otto III, Margrave of Brandenburg (1215–1267)
- Otto III, Count of Weimar-Orlamünde (1244–1285)
- Otto III, Duke of Bavaria (1261–1312)
- Otto III of Carinthia (c. 1265–1310)
- Otto III, Marquess of Montferrat (died 1378)
- Otto III, Prince of Anhalt-Bernburg (died 1404)
- Otto III, Count of Waldeck (c. 1389–1458/9)
- Otto III, Duke of Pomerania (1444–1464)
- Otto III, Count of Rietberg (between 1475 and 1485–1535)

== See also ==
- Otto I (disambiguation)
- Otto II (disambiguation)
- Otto IV (disambiguation)
- Otto V (disambiguation)
- Otto VI (disambiguation)
- Otto VII (disambiguation)
- Otto VIII (disambiguation)
