= Otto II (disambiguation) =

Otto II generally refers to Otto II, Holy Roman Emperor. It may also refer to:

Otto II may also refer to:

- Otto II, Duke of Saxony (912–973), also known as Otto the Great and Otto I (as Holy Roman Emperor)
- Otto II, Duke of Swabia (died 1047), member of the Ezzonid dynasty
- Otto II, Marquess of Montferrat (died 1084), a member of the Aleramid dynasty
- Otto II, Count of Habsburg (died 1111), one of the founding members of the Habsburg family
- Otto II, Count of Scheyern (died 1120), son of Otto I, House of Wittelsbach
- Otto II, Count of Chiny (1065–c, 1131), son of Arnold I and Adélaïs
- Otto II, Count of Duras (died 1147), son of Giselbert II and Gertrud
- Otto II, Margrave of Meissen (1125–1190), member of the House of Wettin
- Otto II, Count of Guelders (13th century), son of Gerard III and Margaretha of Brabant
- Otto II, Margrave of Brandenburg (died 1205), called The Generous (German: der Freigiebige)
- Otto II (bishop of Freising) (died 1220), 24th Bishop of Freising from 1184
- Otto II, Count of Burgundy (c. 1180–1234), also known as Otto I, Duke of Merania
- Otto II of Andechs and Merania (1208–1248), a member of the House of Andechs
- Otto II, Duke of Bavaria (1206–1253), son of Ludwig I and Ludmilla of Bohemia, and a member of the Wittelsbach dynasty
- Otto II, Count of Zutphen (12th century), son of Gottschalk, Count of Zutphen and Adelheid of Zutphen
- Otto II, Prince of Anhalt-Aschersleben (died 1315), German prince of the House of Ascania
- Otto II, Duke of Brunswick-Lüneburg (1260s–1330), House of Welf and Prince of Lüneburg, 1277–1330
- Otto II, Count of Waldeck (died 1369), Count of Waldeck, 1344–1369
- Otto II, Count of Rietberg (died 1389), ruling Count of Rietberg, 1365–1389
- Otto II, Duke of Pomerania (1380s–1428), Duke of Pomerania-Stettin from the House of Griffins
- Otto II, Duke of Brunswick-Osterode (1396–1452), son of Duke Frederick I of Brunswick-Osterode and Adelaide of Anhalt-Zerbst
- Otto II, Duke of Brunswick-Göttingen (1380s–1463), member of the House of Welf,
- Otto II, Count Palatine of Mosbach-Neumarkt (1435–1499), the Count Palatine of Mosbach-Neumarkt, 1461–1499
- Otto II, Duke of Brunswick-Harburg (1528–1603), nicknamed the Younger
- Otto II of Hungary (1912–2011), the last Crown Prince of Austria-Hungary, 1916–1919

== See also ==
- Otto fuel II, a monopropellant used to drive torpedoes and other weapon systems
- Otto I (disambiguation)
- Otto III (disambiguation)
- Otto IV (disambiguation)
- Otto V
- Otto VI
- Otto VII
- Otto VIII
