= Ensdorf =

Ensdorf can refer to:

- Ensdorf, Saarland, a village in the Saarlouis district, Saarland, Germany.
- Ensdorf, Bavaria, a village in the Amberg-Sulzbach district, Bavaria, Germany
- Ensdorf Abbey, in Ensdorf, Bavaria
- Ensdorf-class minesweeper
