= Otto V =

Otto V may refer to:

- Otto V, Count of Orlamünde, father-in-law of Henry VII of Brzeg
- Otto V, Margrave of Brandenburg-Salzwedel (c. 1246 – 1298)
- Otto V, Duke of Bavaria (1346–1379)
- Otto V, Duke of Brunswick-Lüneburg (1439–1471)

== See also ==
- Otto I (disambiguation)
- Otto II (disambiguation)
- Otto III (disambiguation)
- Otto IV (disambiguation)
- Otto VI (disambiguation)
- Otto VII (disambiguation)
- Otto VIII (disambiguation)
