= Otto VII =

Otto VII may refer to:

- Otto VII of Brandenburg, known as Otto V, Duke of Bavaria
- Otto VII, Count of Tecklenburg
- Otto VII, Count Palatine of Bavaria
- Otto VII of Andechs, known as Otto I, Duke of Merania

== See also ==
- Otto I (disambiguation)
- Otto II (disambiguation)
- Otto III (disambiguation)
- Otto IV (disambiguation)
- Otto V (disambiguation)
- Otto VI (disambiguation)
- Otto VIII (disambiguation)
