= Otto VIII =

Otto VIII may refer to:

- Otto VIII, Count Palatine of Bavaria (died 1209), son of Count Otto VII of Wittelsbach and murderer of king Philip of Swabia
- Otto VIII of Andechs (died 1248), better known as Otto III, Count of Burgundy
- Otto VIII, Count of Bentheim-Tecklenburg, a state leader in 1499–1514
- Otto VIII, Count of Hoya (1530–1582), the last ruling Count of Hoya 1563–1582

== See also ==
- Otto I (disambiguation)
- Otto II (disambiguation)
- Otto III (disambiguation)
- Otto IV (disambiguation)
- Otto V (disambiguation)
- Otto VI (disambiguation)
- Otto VII (disambiguation)
