= Markt Indersdorf =

- Municipality
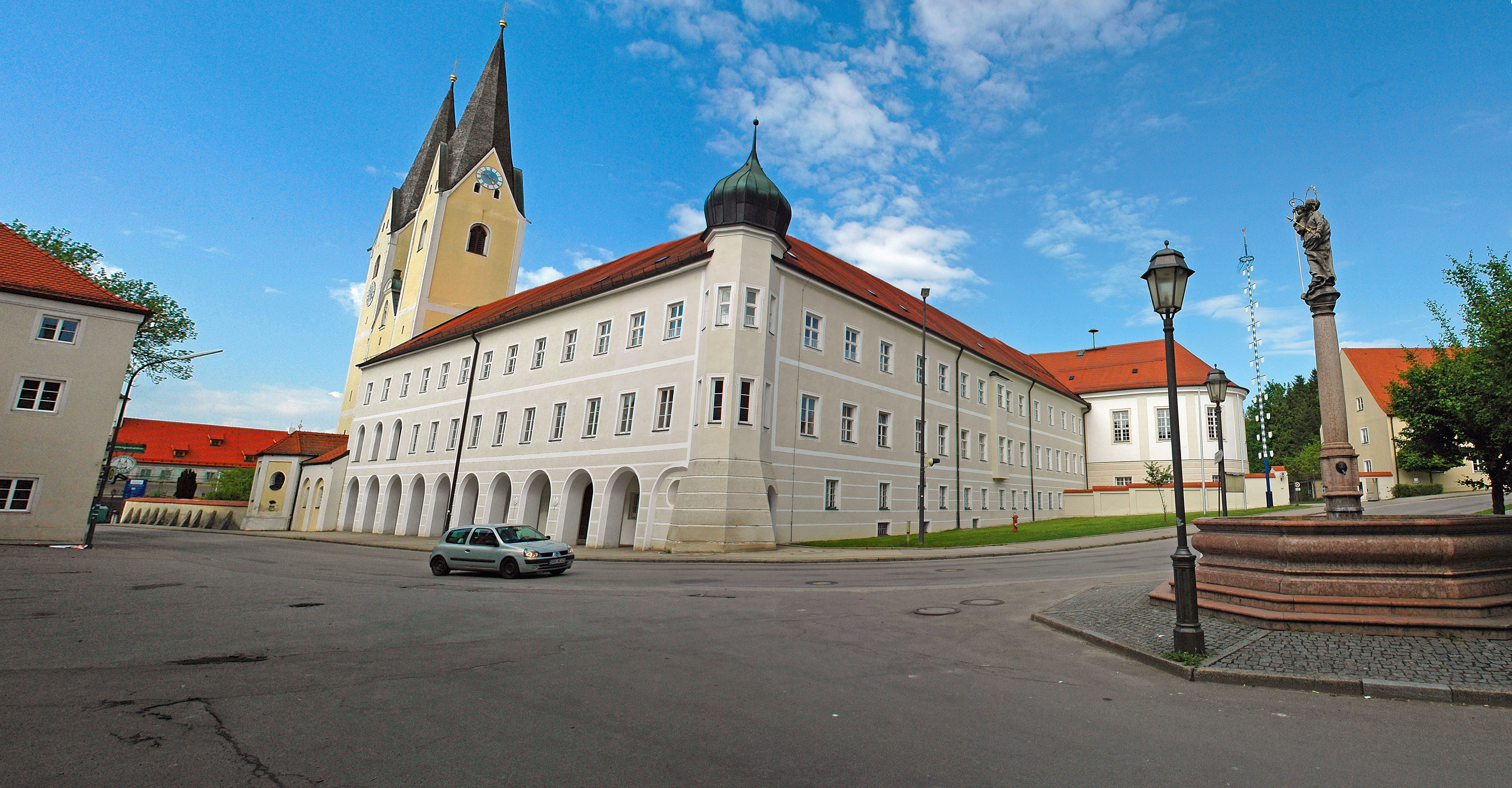
- Indersdorf Abbey

- Coat of arms

- Location of Markt Indersdorf within Dachau district
- Interactive map of Markt Indersdorf
- Location within Germany Location within Bavaria
- Coordinates: 48°22′N 11°22′E
- Country: Germany
- State: Bavaria
- Admin. region: Oberbayern
- District: Dachau

Government
  - Mayor (2020–26): Franz Obesser (CSU)

Area
  - Total: 68.60 km^{2} (26.49 sq mi)
- Elevation: 471 m (1,545 ft)

Population (2025-12-31)
  - Total: 10,366
  - Density: 151.1/km^{2} (391.4/sq mi)
- Time zone: UTC+01:00 (CET)
  - Summer (DST): UTC+02:00 (CEST)
- Postal codes: 85229
- Dialling codes: 08136
- Vehicle registration: DAH
- Website: www.markt-indersdorf.de

Markt Indersdorf is a municipality in the district of Dachau in Bavaria in Germany.

== Geography ==
Markt Indersdorf is located on the Glonn River. The Glonn divides the two main towns Markt Indersdorf and Kloster(monastery) Indersdorf. Markt Indersdorf is the largest town in the Dachau hinterland with a central location within the Dachau district. The closest villages are Langenpettenbach, Engelbrechtsmühle, Glonn, Karphofen, Strassbach, and Untermoosmühle. Other villages further out are Ainhofen, Eichstock, Langenpettenbach and Hirtlbach.

== History ==
The area around Indersdorf has been inhabited by humans for thousands of years. Remains of Celtic/Vindelici structures near Arnzell (between Indersdorf and Altomünster) have been discovered. A Roman road that went from Salzburg to Augsburg passed through a forest south-east of Indersdorf. The road would later be used for oxen/cattle trading in the Middle Ages. The place name "Indersdorf" may refer to the Bavarian name "Undeo" or "Undio", who worked as a clergyman in Indersdorf in the 9th century. Indersdorf was first mentioned in a document in 972 AD.

An Augustinian monastery and church, in honor of the Assumption of Mary (Klosterkirche Maria Himmelfahrt) was founded in 1120 by order of Count Otto IV. von Wittelsbach, as atonement for his sins for kidnapping Pope Paschal II during a military campaign in Italy with Emperor Henry V in 1111 AD. The church and monastery formed an economic and spiritual center of the area. In 1223 the monks founded a monastery school. During the Thirty Years' War the town was looted by the Swedes in 1632 and in 1634. In 1635 the plague broke out.

In 1704, during the War of the Spanish Succession, an army of English and Austrian troops crossed the Danube River and began to plunder sections of Bavaria. The monks at the monastery in Indersdorf had to flee to Munich. According to one church record: "because after the Battle of Höchstädt the enemy troops penetrated in full force into Bavaria via Augsburg and plundered everything in Indersdorf on August 19th".

The monastery pharmacy was built in 1790, followed by a monastery brewery in 1803, now converted into a 'Wirsthaus' and 'Biergarten' since 2016.

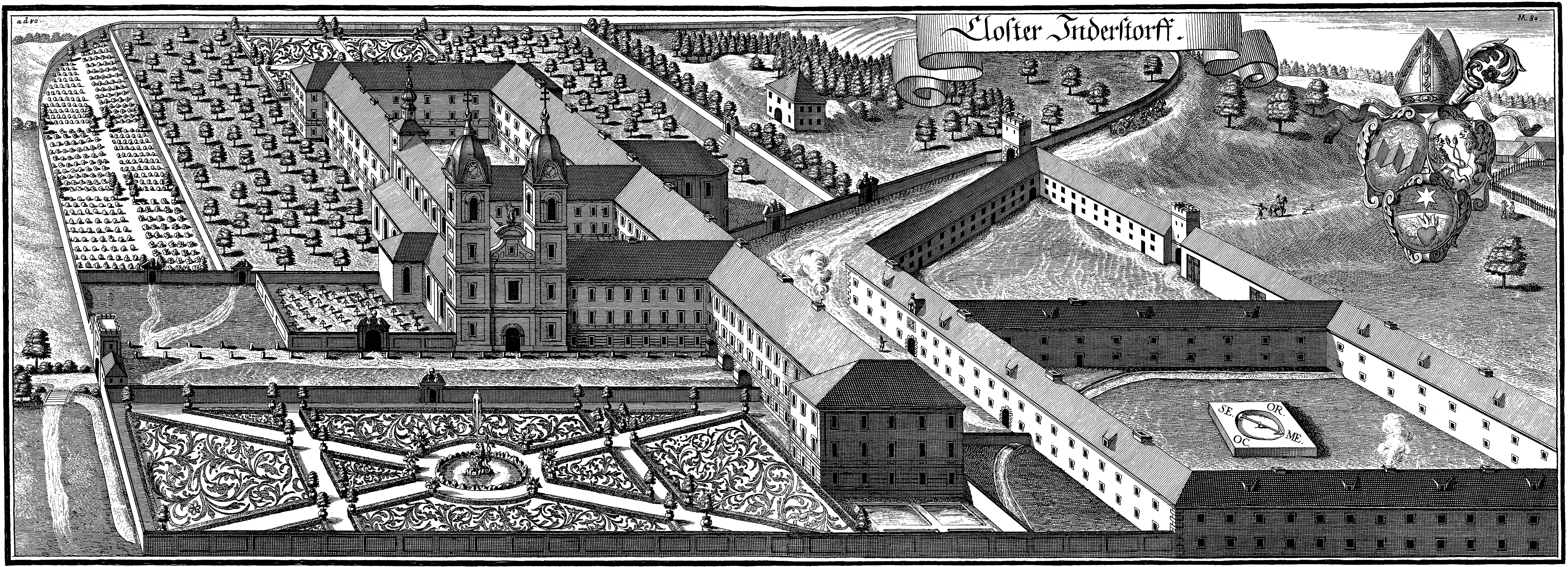
Monastery in Indersdorf around 1700

In 1856 the Sisters of Mercy of St. Vincent de Paul set up an orphanage. Since the 1990s, the last of the nuns moved away and the monastery is no longer active. However the Archdiocese of Munich and Freising still owns the church and property.

A hospital was built in Indersdorf in 1869, which still exists to this day.

In 1882, by proclamation of King Ludwig II, the name of the community was officially changed from Indersdorf to Markt Indersdorf. This means the town now has the right to hold large public markets (German: Marktrecht).

In 1912/1913 the first railway line between Dachau and Altomünster passed through Markt Indersdorf.

In 1938, a children's home was set up in the monastery. During World War II, a “children's barracks” was built in 1944 for infants of foreign forced laborers from the Soviet Union and Poland, most of whom were the result of abuse. 32 children housed there died from inadequate care and malnutrition. After the Second World War, the United Nations Relief and Rehabilitation Administration set up a reception camp for minors persecuted by National Socialism in the former monastery.

After the Bavarian region reforms of 1972, several nearby communities were incorporated into Markt Indersdorf.

At the beginning of the 21st century, Markt Indersdorf has grown to become the central location of the Dachau district. There have been various infrastructure improvements such as better traffic routes, school structure, clinical care, and economy and trade. The electrification of the S-Bahn commuter train line (S2) on the Altomünster-Dachau route was completed in 2014.

In 2020 Markt Indersdorf celebrated its 900th anniversary of the founding of the monastery and church. However many of the festivities were cancelled due to the COVID-19 pandemic in Germany.

== Political ==
The current mayor (Bürgermeister) of Markt Indersdorf is Franz Obesser (CSU) since 2014.

The population of Markt Indersdorf, as of 2019, is 10,921 people.

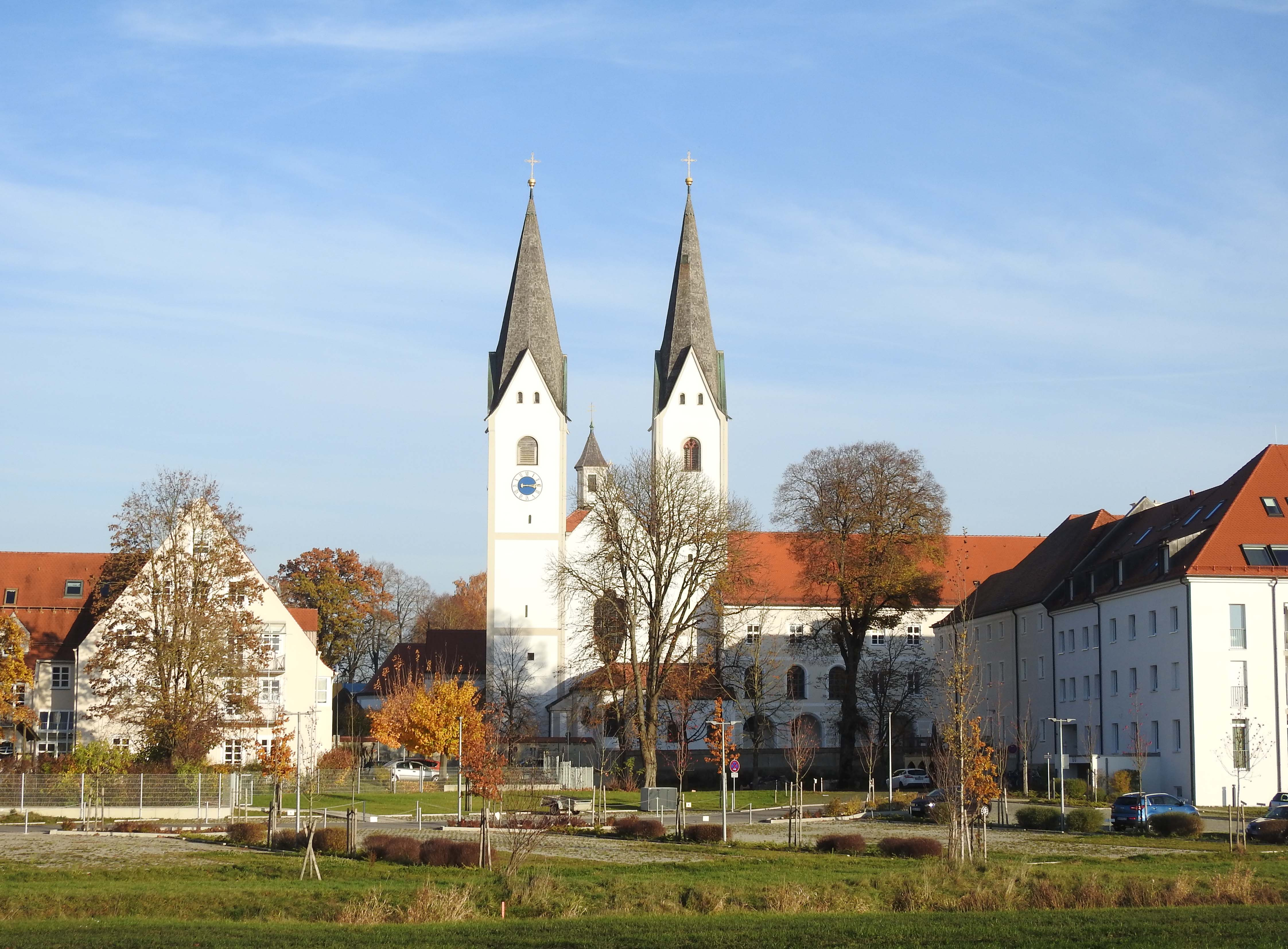
Markt Indersdorf (2018)

== Culture and Sports ==
Markt Indersdorf offers numerous hiking and biking trails, which lead through the Glonn Valley and the varied hilly landscapes.

An original tower from the Middle Ages (the 'Schneiderturm', near the monastery church) has been converted into a Museum (Augustiner-Chorherren-Museum) since 2014.

The Indersdorfer Volksfest takes place every summer.

There is an annual Adventsmarkt in the monastery church square before Christmas.

There is also an annual Carnaval Parade (Fasching) through Indersdorf the Sunday before Ash Wednesday.

The sports club in the town is TSV Indersdorf 1907 e.V.

Near Markt Indersdorf is the 18-hole golf course 'Gut Häusern'.
