= Seeon Lakes =

Group of german lakes

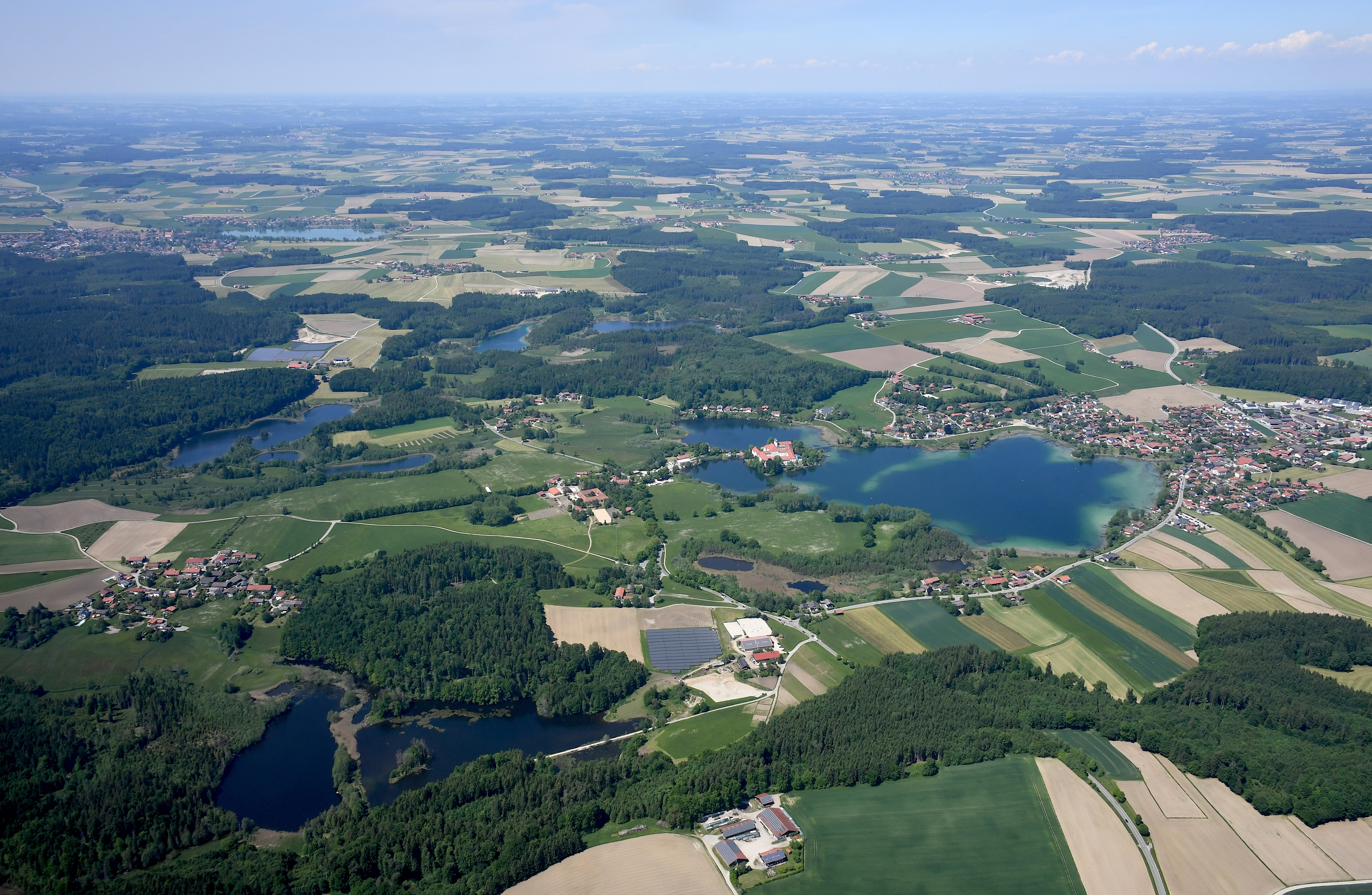
- Aerial image of the Seeon Lakes showing the Bansee in the lower left part of the image, the Klostersee to the right of the center of the image, the Seeleitensee, Mittersee, and Jägersee (from left to right) to the left of the center of the image, and the Brunnensee and Griessee (from left to right) above the center of the image

- Location within Bavaria
- Location: Bavaria, Germany
- Coordinates: 47°58′30″N 12°27′00″E
- Lake type: Glacial lake
- Primary outflows: Alz
- Settlements: Seeon-Seebruck, Obing

Seeon Lakes (German: Seeoner Seen) is a small group of kettle lakes in Bavaria, Germany. It is located 4 kilometres (2.5 mi) north of Lake Chiemsee in the district of Traunstein. The lakes are protected as the nature reserve (German: Naturschutzgebiet) Seeoner Seen. On the main lake Seeoner See is a field station for limnological research from LMU Munich, Faculty of Biology.

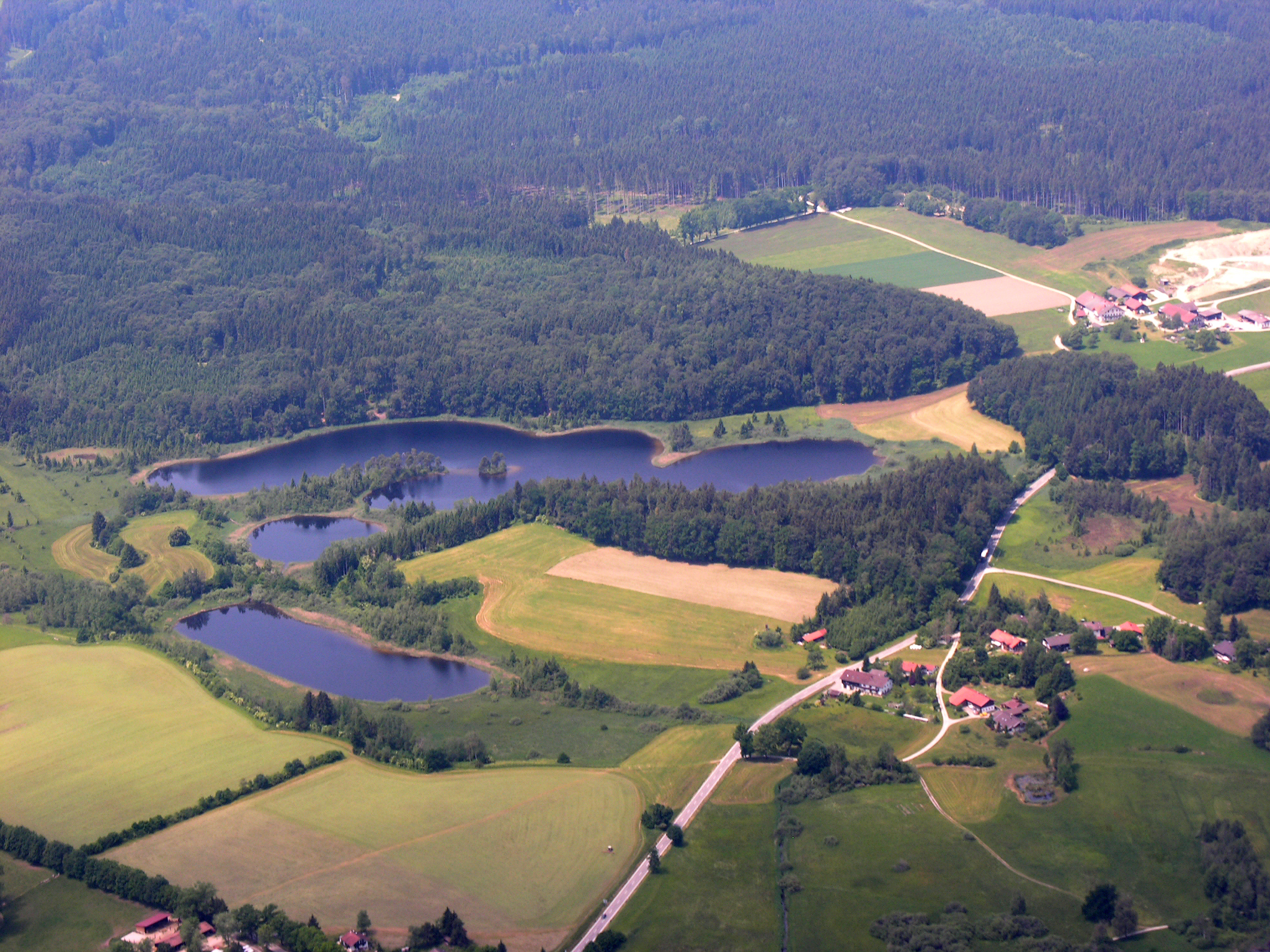
Seeleiten-, Mitter- and Jägersee (top to bottom)

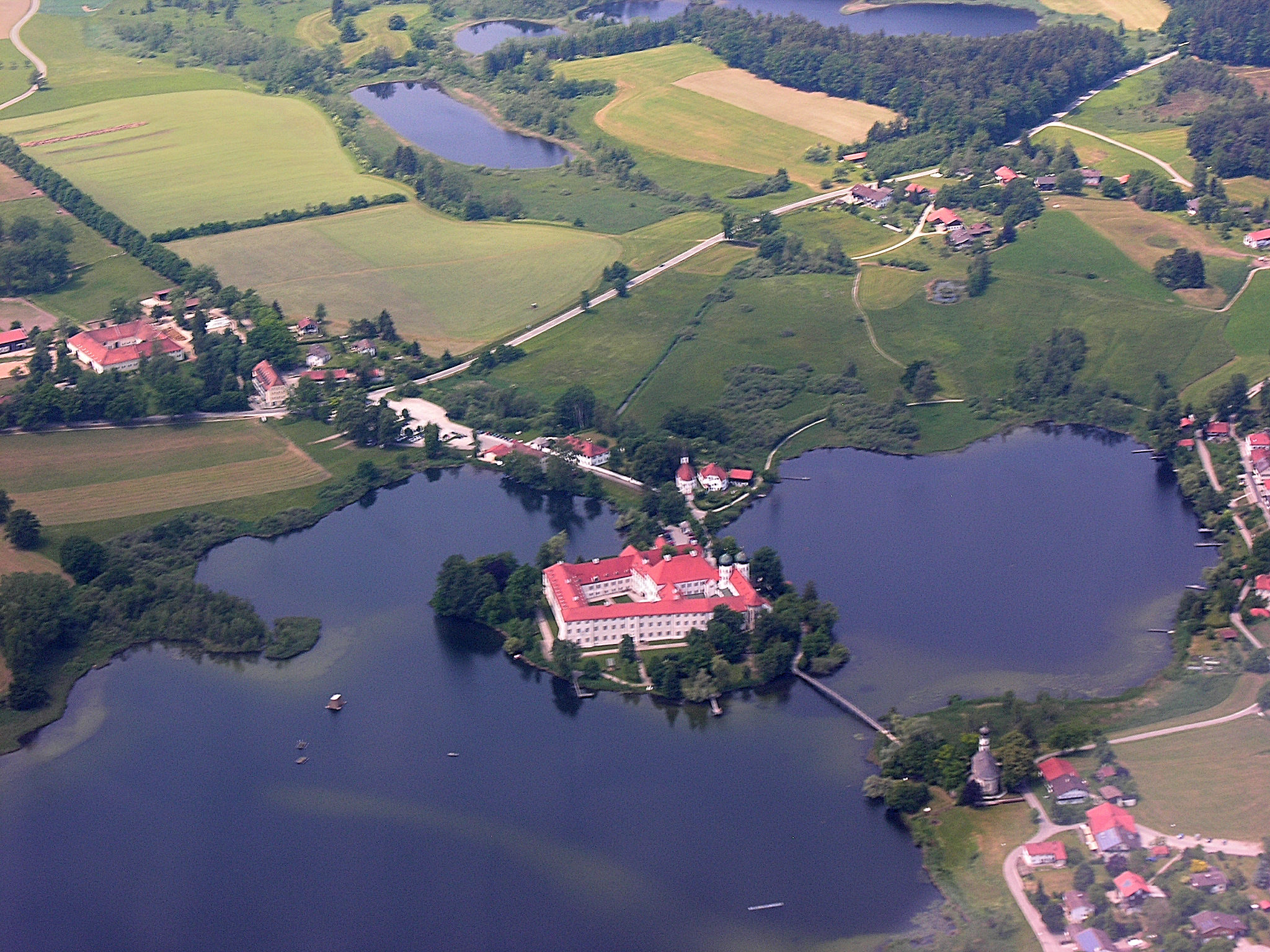
Seeon Abbey on an island in the Klostersee (l.tr.: Abbey Lake)

== Lakes ==
1. Klostersee (Seeoner See) 47 ha (120 acres)
2. Griessee 9.21 ha (22.8 acres)
3. Brunnensee 5.88 ha (14.5 acres) (deapest lake 18.6 m (61 ft))
4. Seeleitensee 8.28 ha (20.5 acres)
5. Mittersee (Esterpointersee) 0.78 ha (1.9 acres)
6. Jägersee 2.21 ha (5.5 acres)
7. Bansee 3.30 ha (8.2 acres)
