= Seeon Abbey =

Coordinates: 47°58′28″N 12°26′53″E

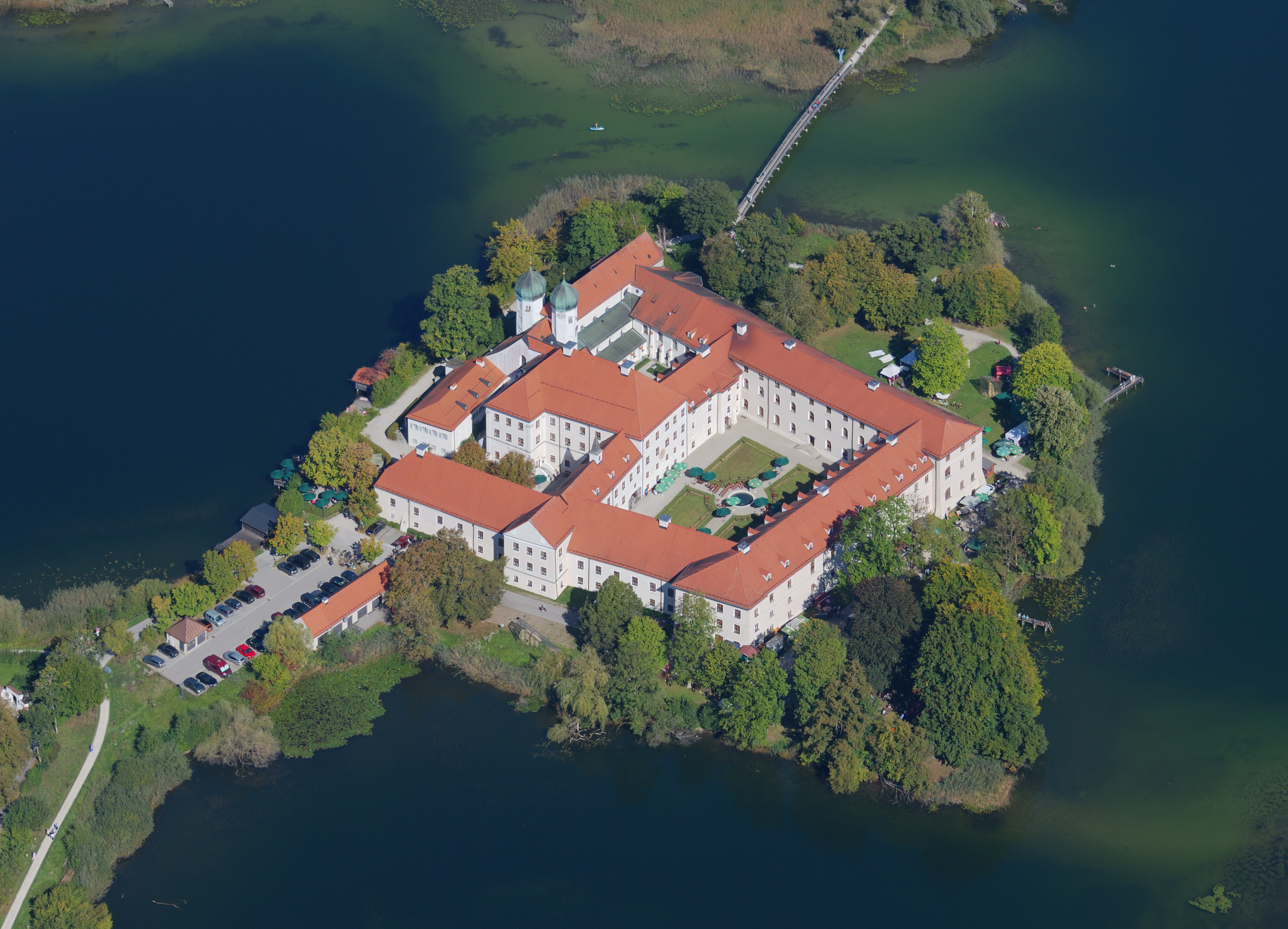
Aerial view of Seeon Abbey

Seeon Abbey (German: Kloster Seeon) is a former Benedictine monastery in the municipality of Seeon-Seebruck in the rural district of Traunstein in Bavaria, Germany.

== History ==
Seeon Abbey was founded in 994 by the Bavarian Pfalzgraf Aribo I, a member of the Aribonid dynasty, and settled by Benedictine monks from St. Emmeram's Abbey in Regensburg. The monastery is on an island in the lake Seeoner See, part of the present-day municipality of Seeon-Seebruck. The abbey soon developed a significant scriptorium, producing manuscripts not only for the abbey's own use but also for other monasteries and churches. Their most important client was Emperor Henry II, who presented many volumes to the Bishopric of Bamberg, which he had founded in 1007.

Toward the end of the 11th century the abbey church was re-built in the Romanesque style, but this building stood for only 100 years or so, before in about 1180 it was replaced by the present church, terminating in the east with an apse. More alterations in the late Gothic style were carried out between 1428 and 1433 by Konrad Pürkhel of Burghausen. The Romanesque basilica was given a vaulted ceiling and a new choir. In 1579 the church was decorated with unusual Renaissance frescoes, showing, alongside scenes from the life of Christ and the Virgin Mary, the patrons, Saints Benedict and Lambert, and the founders, Aribo and Adala. Also of special note is the red marble gravestone of Abbot Honorat Kolb and the gravestones of the abbots of the 15th and 16th centuries lined up against the walls of the castle chapel. In the middle stands the tomb of the founder, Count Aribo I, made by Hans Heider in about 1400. The restored cloisters are also worth seeing.

The original of the Madonna and Child (or the Seeoner Muttergottes, created in 1433 by the "Master of Seeon", as the anonymous artist is known) is considered one of the most beautiful representations of the subject. Since 1855 it has been in the Bavarian National Museum in Munich, but a copy has stood since 1947 on the high altar of the present parish church. The sacristy at Seeon contains a far older Madonna of about 1380.

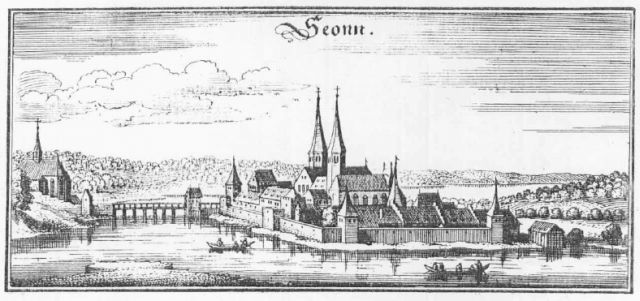
Engraving from "Topographia Germaniae des Matthaeus Merian", c. 1644

The church originally had only one tower, that is, the north one, built to the model of that at Frauenchiemsee. The second tower was added at the end of the 12th century. The Romanesque towers are reminiscent of Freising Cathedral and, like the Frauenkirche at Munich, have copper "onion towers", which were added after a fire in 1561. Between 1657 and 1670 the church was extended by the construction of a sacristy in the Lady Chapel, an oratory and a crypt beneath the chapel of Saint Barbara.

Until the secularisation of Bavaria in 1803 Seeon was a place of learning and culture: Joseph Haydn was a guest here, and Mozart was active here between 1767 and 1769.

After 1803 the abbey was dissolved and the buildings were turned into a castle, and used later at various times as a medicinal spa, convalescent home and barracks. The infirmary and the library were demolished, and a causeway constructed connecting the island to the mainland.

In 1989 the premises were eventually acquired by the government of the administrative region of Oberbayern and after a lengthy restoration reopened in 1993 as a cultural and educational centre, which is now used for concerts, exhibitions, seminars, conferences and workshops.

Since 2017, the Christian Social Union's group in the German Parliament has been holding its annual retreat at Seeon Abbey. Notable guests at the retreat have since included Prime Minister Erna Solberg of Norway (2017); European Commissioner Julian King (2017); Mayor of Kyiv Vitali Klitschko (2018); Prime Minister Leo Varadkar of Ireland (2019); President Klaus Iohannis of Romania (2020); Prime Minister Natalia Gavrilița of Moldova (2023); President of the European Parliament Roberta Metsola (2023); President of the European Commission Ursula von der Leyen (2024); Deputy Prime Minister Mariya Gabriel of Bulgaria (2024); Prime Minister Kyriakos Mitsotakis of Greece (2025); and Prime Minister Luc Frieden of Luxembourg (2025).

== Burials ==
- Frederick II, Count of Diessen
- Engelbert, Duke of Carinthia
- Anna Anderson

== Note ==
- Encomium by Gerhard of Seeon on Emperor Henry II and his foundation at Bamberg (in German)
