= Ainhofen =

- Village of Markt Indersdorf
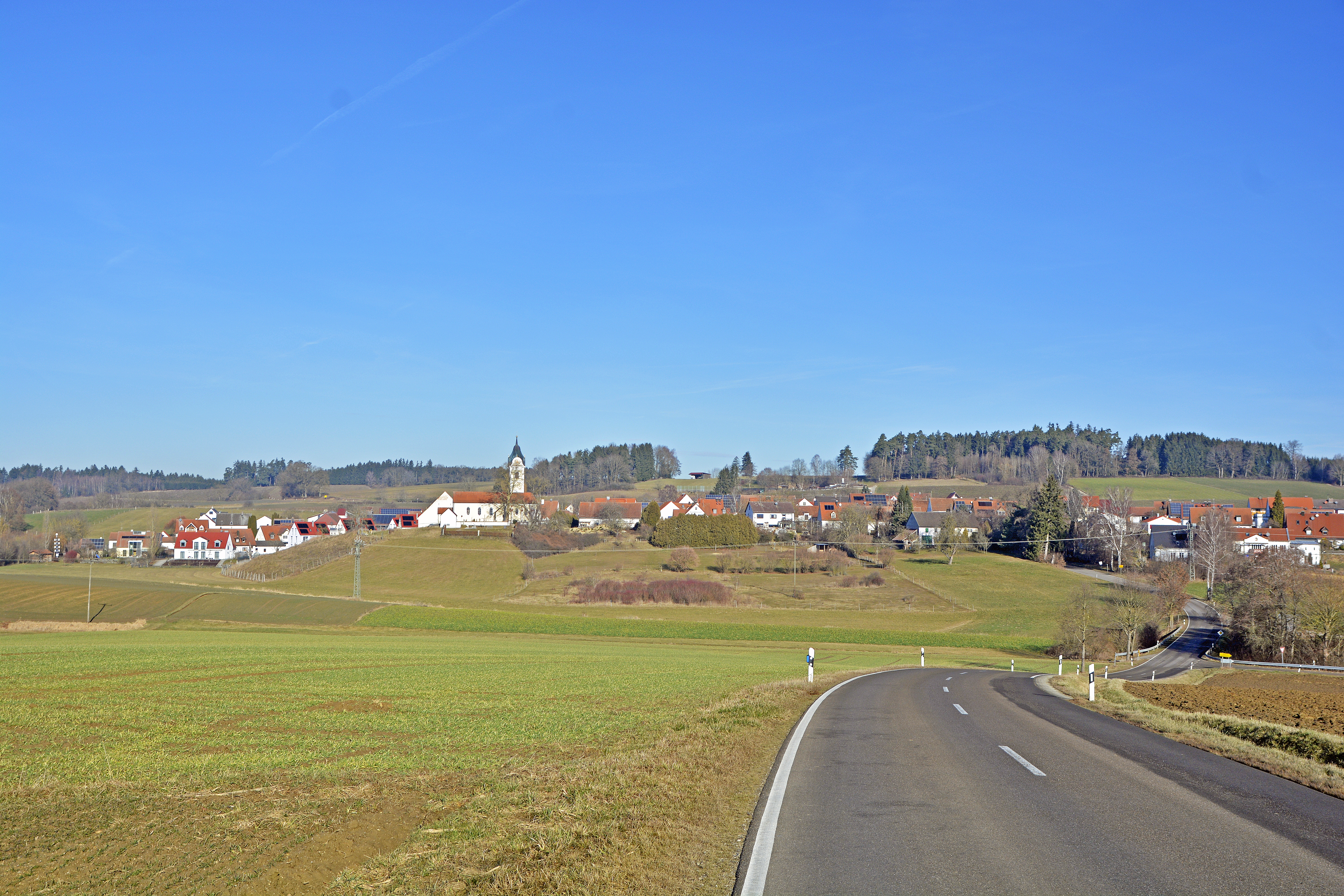
- View of Ainhofen from the south
- Interactive map of Ainhofen
- Location within Germany Location within Bavaria
- Coordinates: 48°24′04″N 11°22′45″E
- Country: Germany
- State: Bavaria
- Admin. region: Oberbayern
- District: Dachau
- Municipality: Markt Indersdorf
- Elevation: 502 m (1,647 ft)

Population (1987)
  - Total: 209
- Time zone: UTC+01:00 (CET)
  - Summer (DST): UTC+02:00 (CEST)
- Postal codes: 85229

Ainhofen is a village in the municipality of Markt Indersdorf, in the Upper Bavarian district of Dachau in Bavaria in Germany.

== History ==
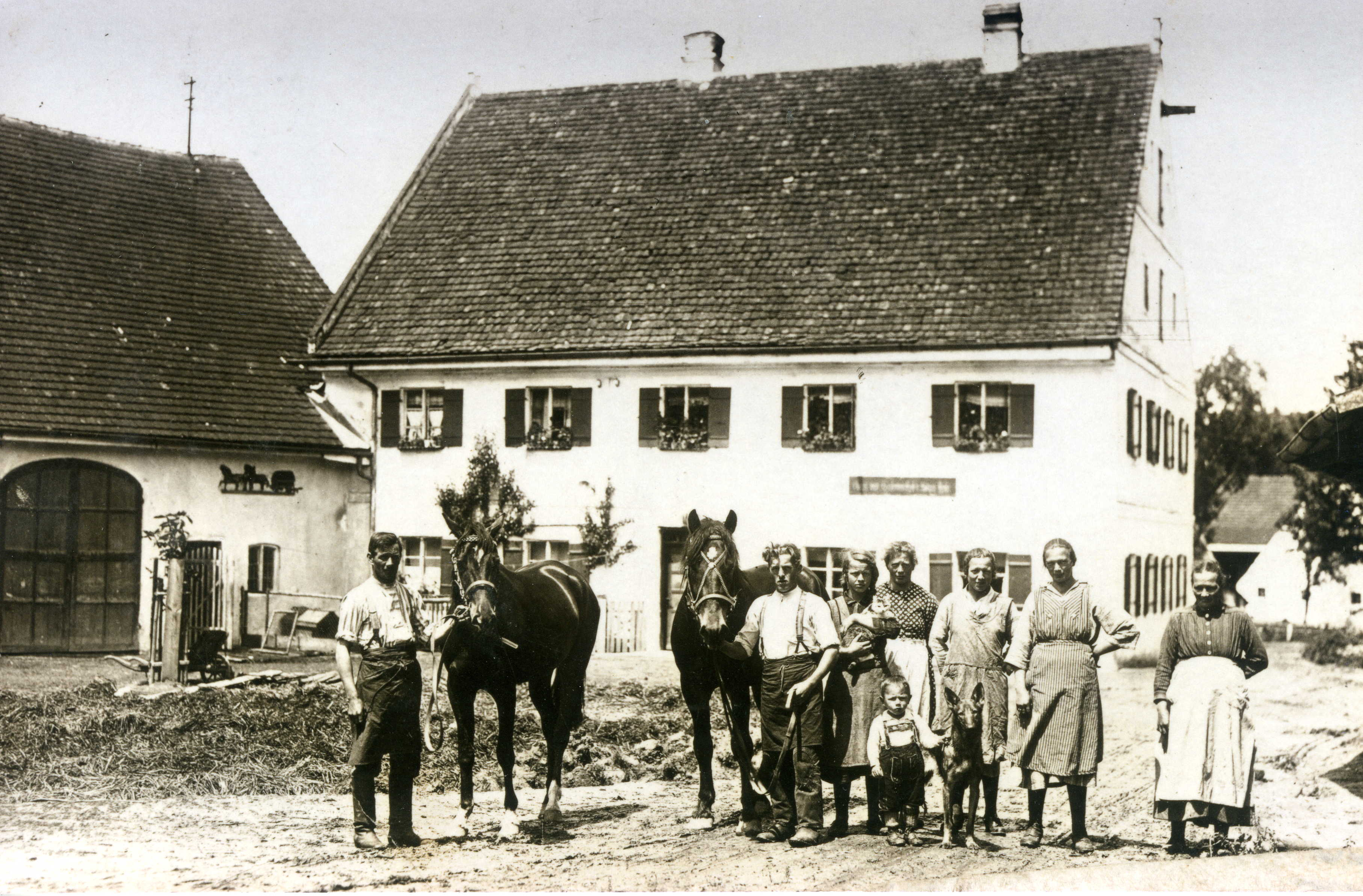
The „Wirt“, ca 1926

=== Older History ===
Ainhofen ("Eiinhofa" or "Farm from Eio") was first mentioned in 837 AD as a church village. The Indersdorf monastery built a local church around 1229. The church was keen to promote a Marian pilgrimage, which is based on a miracle of the statue of Mary from the 12th century.

Ainhofen was robbed and largely destroyed during the Thirty Years' War.

=== 20th Century ===
An outdoor pool facility was built in 1960 by the members of the swimming club and has been renovated.

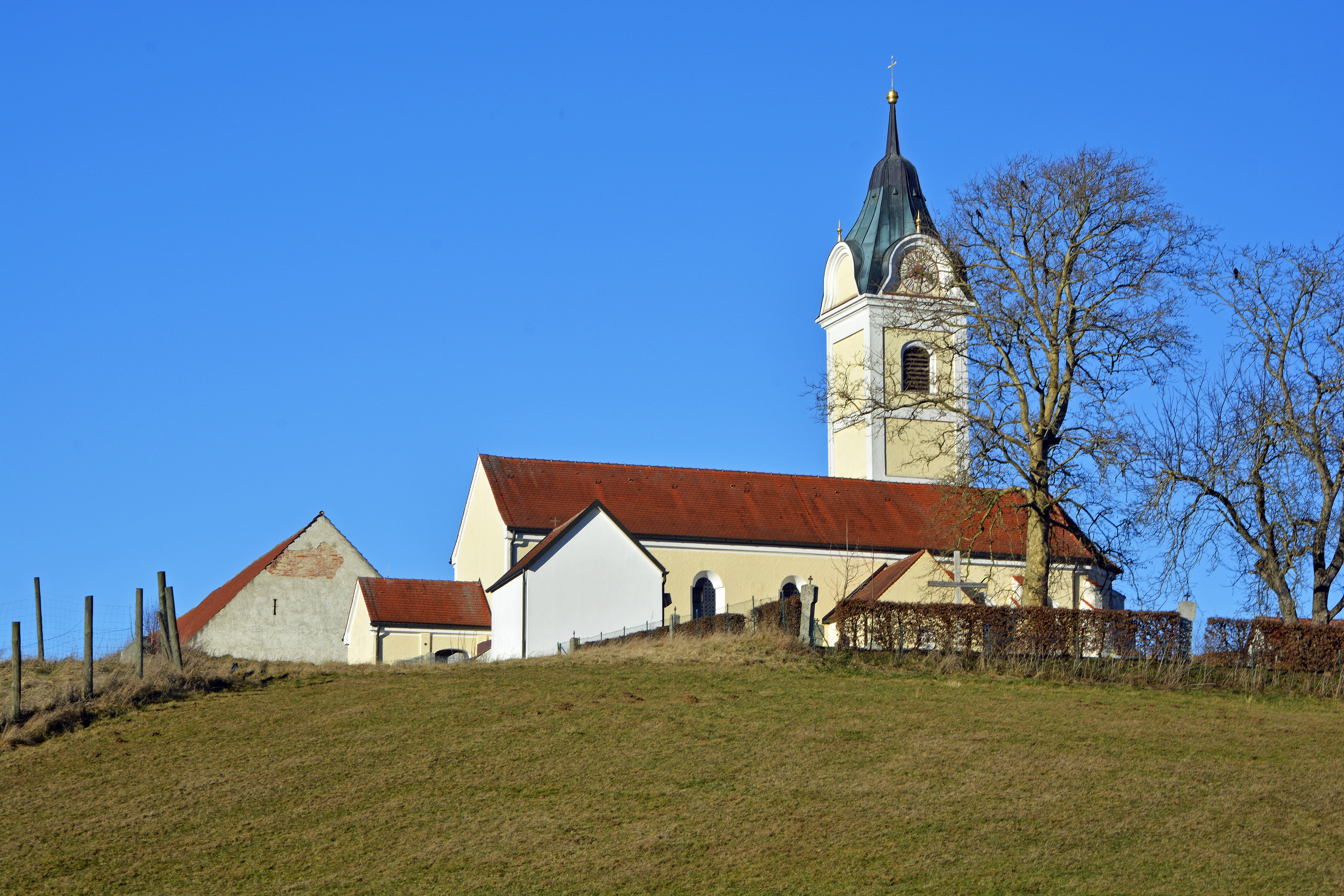
St. Maria Church, Ainhofen

=== Pilgrimage ===
In 1515 a pilgrimage started in Ainhofen. The focal point was the miraculous Romanesque Madonna of grace (the oldest in southern Germany). Since 1700, two to three hundred Marian pilgrimages were held annually. In 2019 the Ainhofen pilgrimage celebrated its 500th anniversary.
