= Seeon-Seebruck =

- Municipality
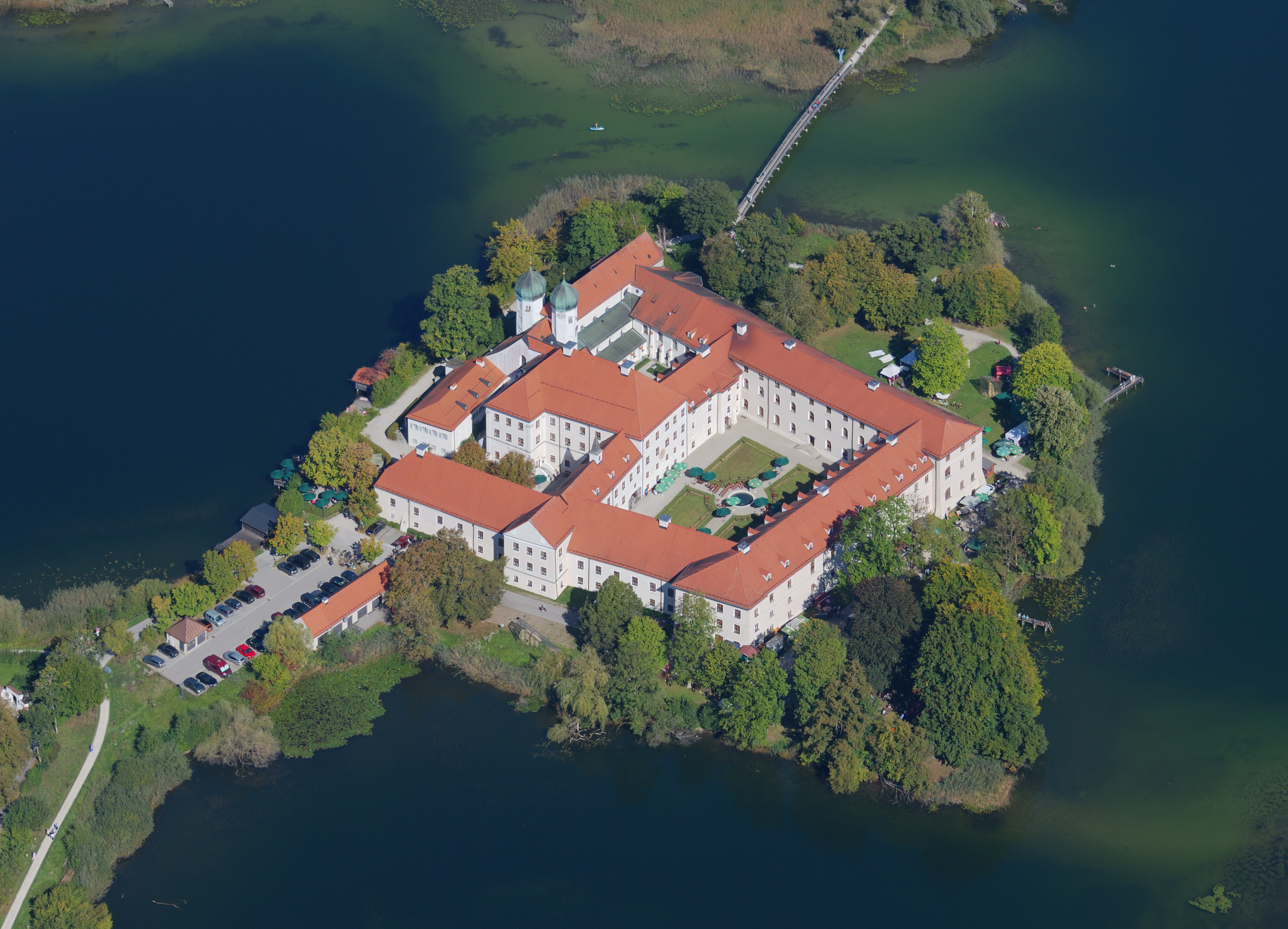
- Seeon Abbey

- Coat of arms

- Location of Seeon-Seebruck within Traunstein district
- Interactive map of Seeon-Seebruck
- Location within Germany Location within Bavaria
- Coordinates: 47°58′N 12°28′E
- Country: Germany
- State: Bavaria
- Admin. region: Oberbayern
- District: Traunstein

Government
  - Mayor (2020–26): Martin Bartlweber

Area
  - Total: 47.93 km^{2} (18.51 sq mi)
- Elevation: 537 m (1,762 ft)

Population (2025-12-31)
  - Total: 4,537
  - Density: 94.66/km^{2} (245.2/sq mi)
- Time zone: UTC+01:00 (CET)
  - Summer (DST): UTC+02:00 (CEST)
- Postal codes: 83358, 83370
- Dialling codes: 08667
- Vehicle registration: TS
- Website: www.seeon-seebruck.de

Seeon-Seebruck (German pronunciation: [ˈzeːɔn ˈzeːbʁʊk]) is a municipality in the district of Traunstein in southern Bavaria in Germany.

== Municipal districts ==
- Seeon 6 km north of Lake Chiemsee within the Seeon Lakes.
- Seebruck is a popular local tourist spot in the north end of Lake Chiemsee where the river Alz origins. The town is a popular base for sailing activities.
- Truchtlaching 5 km east of Seebruck on the Alz river.
