= Ensdorf Abbey =

Monastery in Bavaria, Germany

Coordinates: 49°20′27″N 11°56′11″E

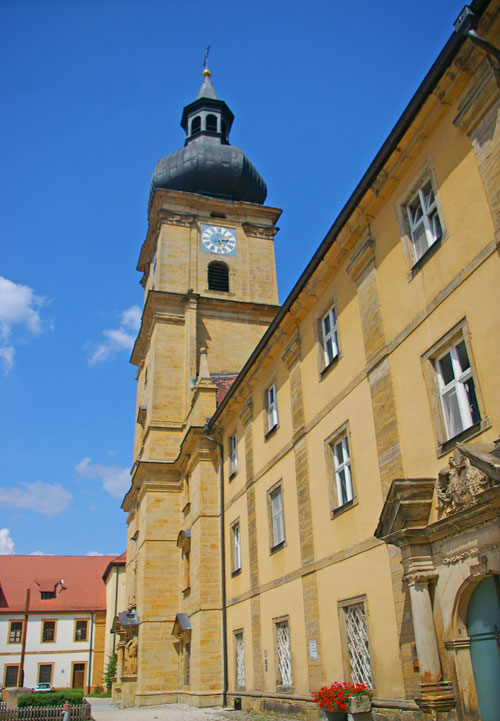
St. James's Church, Ensdorf Abbey

Ensdorf Abbey (German: Kloster Ensdorf) was a Benedictine monastery located at Ensdorf in Bavaria, Germany. Dedicated to Saint James, the monastery was founded in 1121 by Pfalzgraf Otto of Wittelsbach. It was dissolved in 1556 but restored in 1669, only to be dissolved again in 1802 in the secularisation of the period.

The premises were taken over in 1920 by the Salesians of Don Bosco, who still occupy them.

== See also ==
- 18th-century Western domes
