= Otto VI =

Otto VI may refer to:

- Otto I, Duke of Bavaria (died 1183), who was Otto VI as count palatine before he was duke
- Otto VI, Margrave of Brandenburg-Salzwedel (died 1303)
- Otto VI, Count of Tecklenburg (died 1388)
