= Regensburg =

City in Bavaria, Germany

Regensburg Rengschburg / Rengschburch (Bavarian)
- City
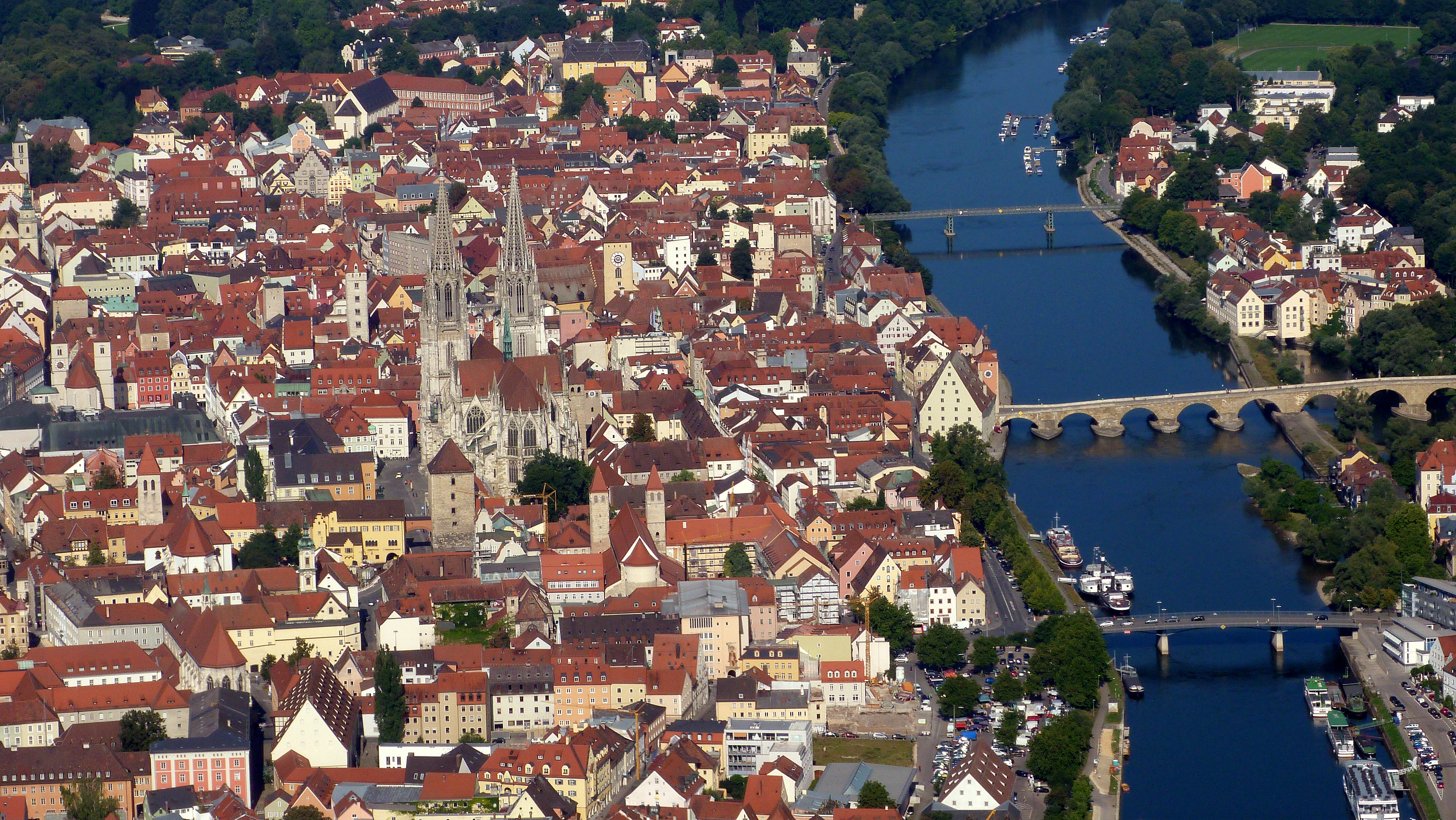
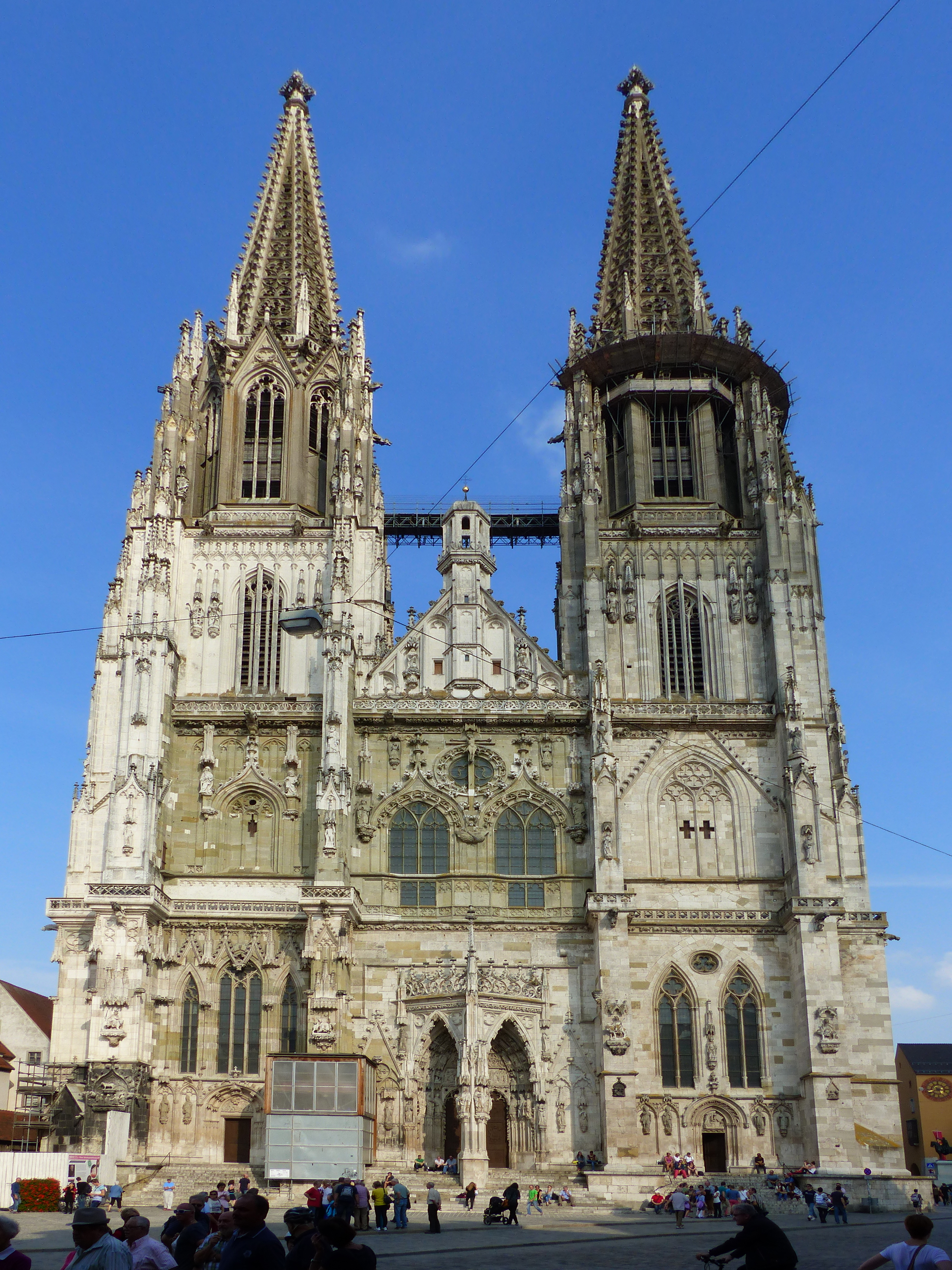
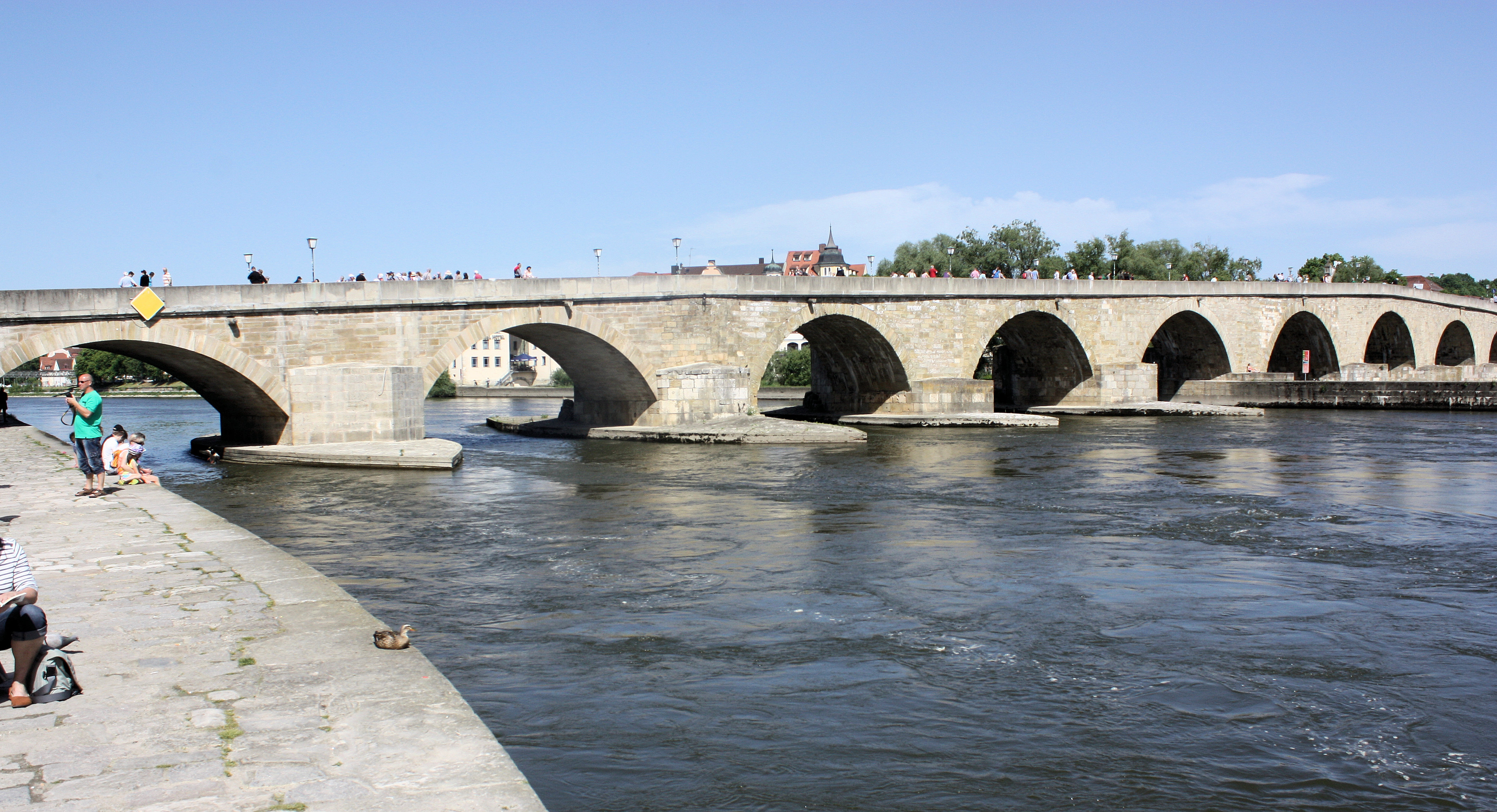
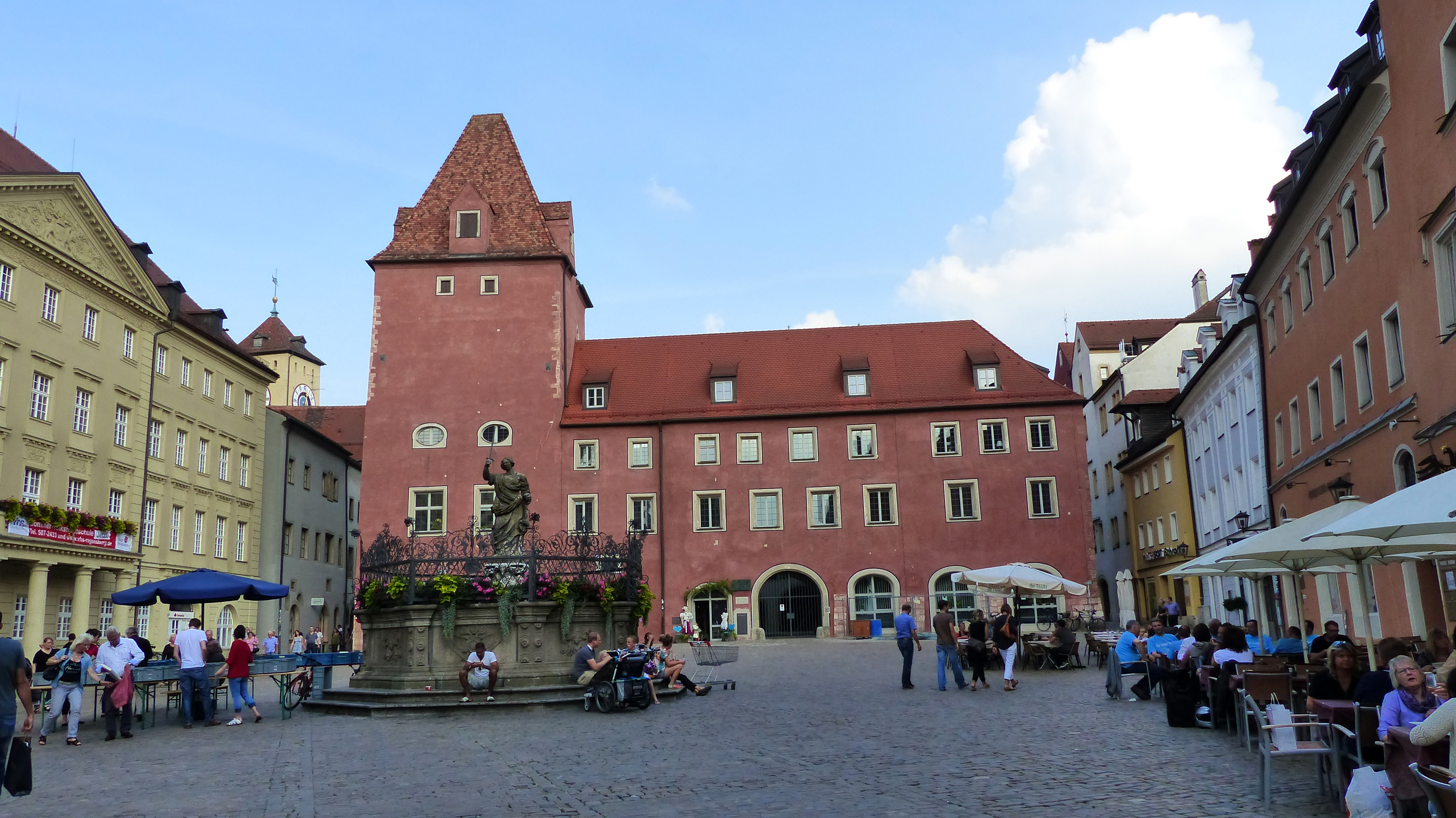
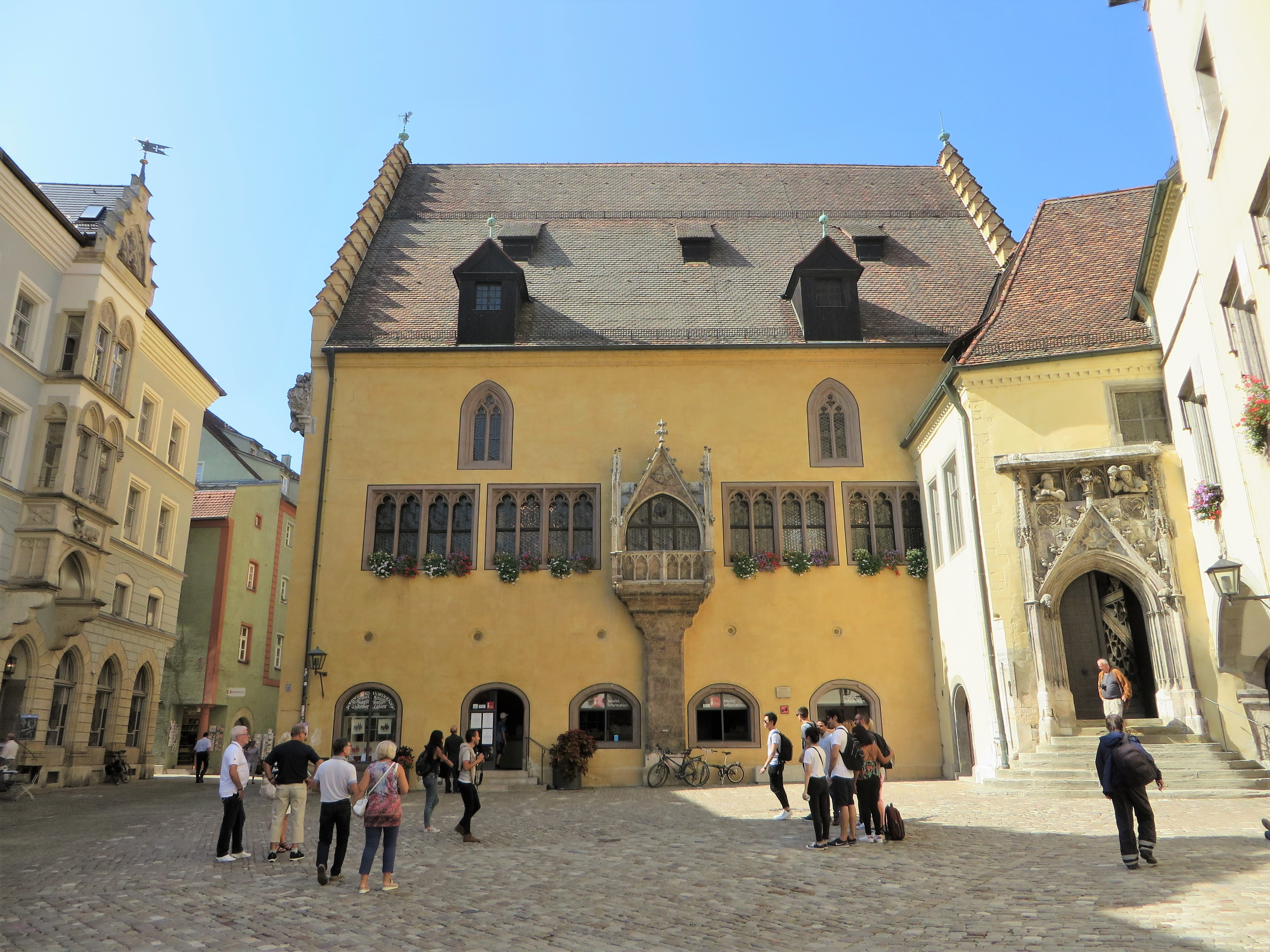
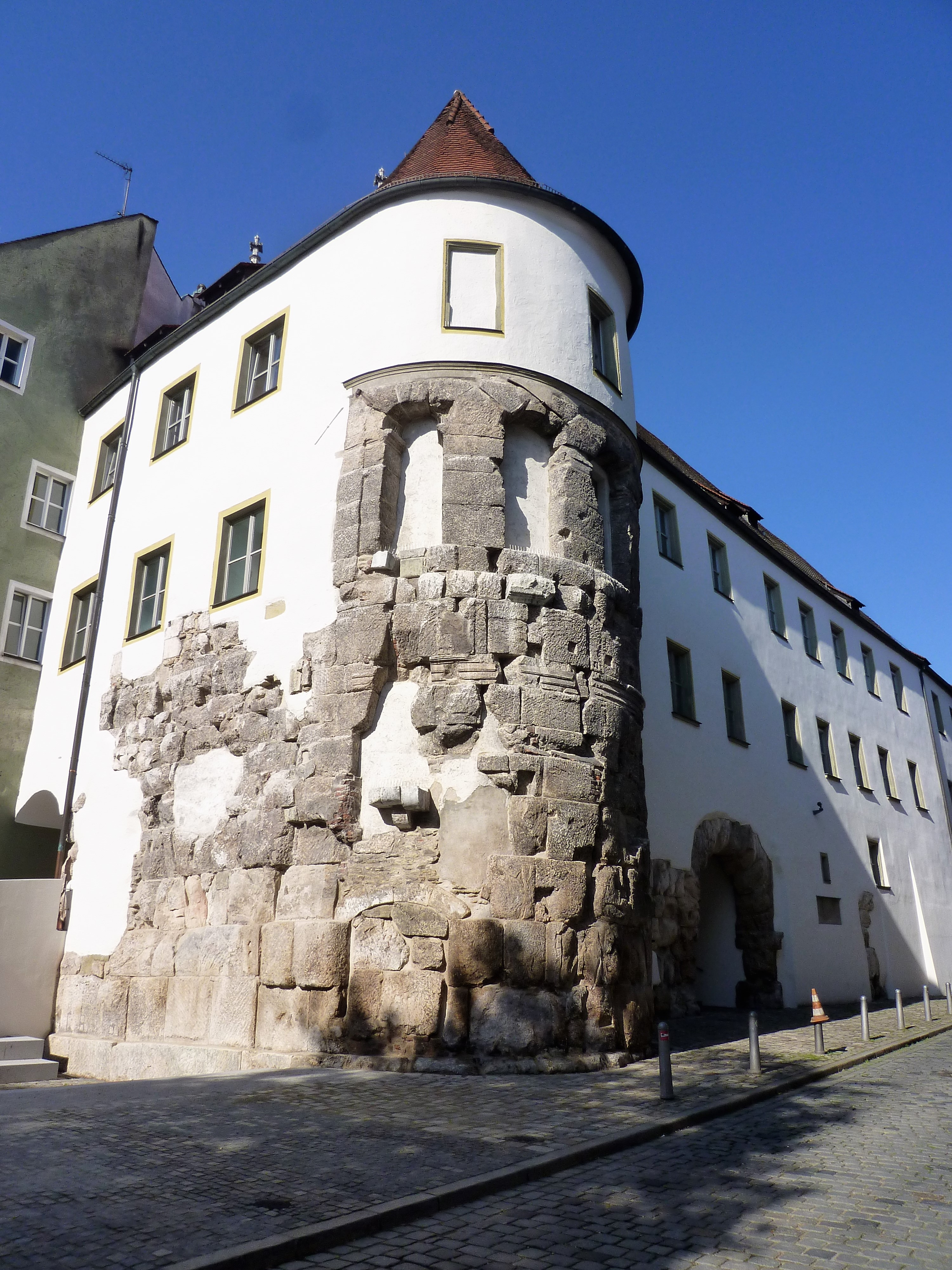
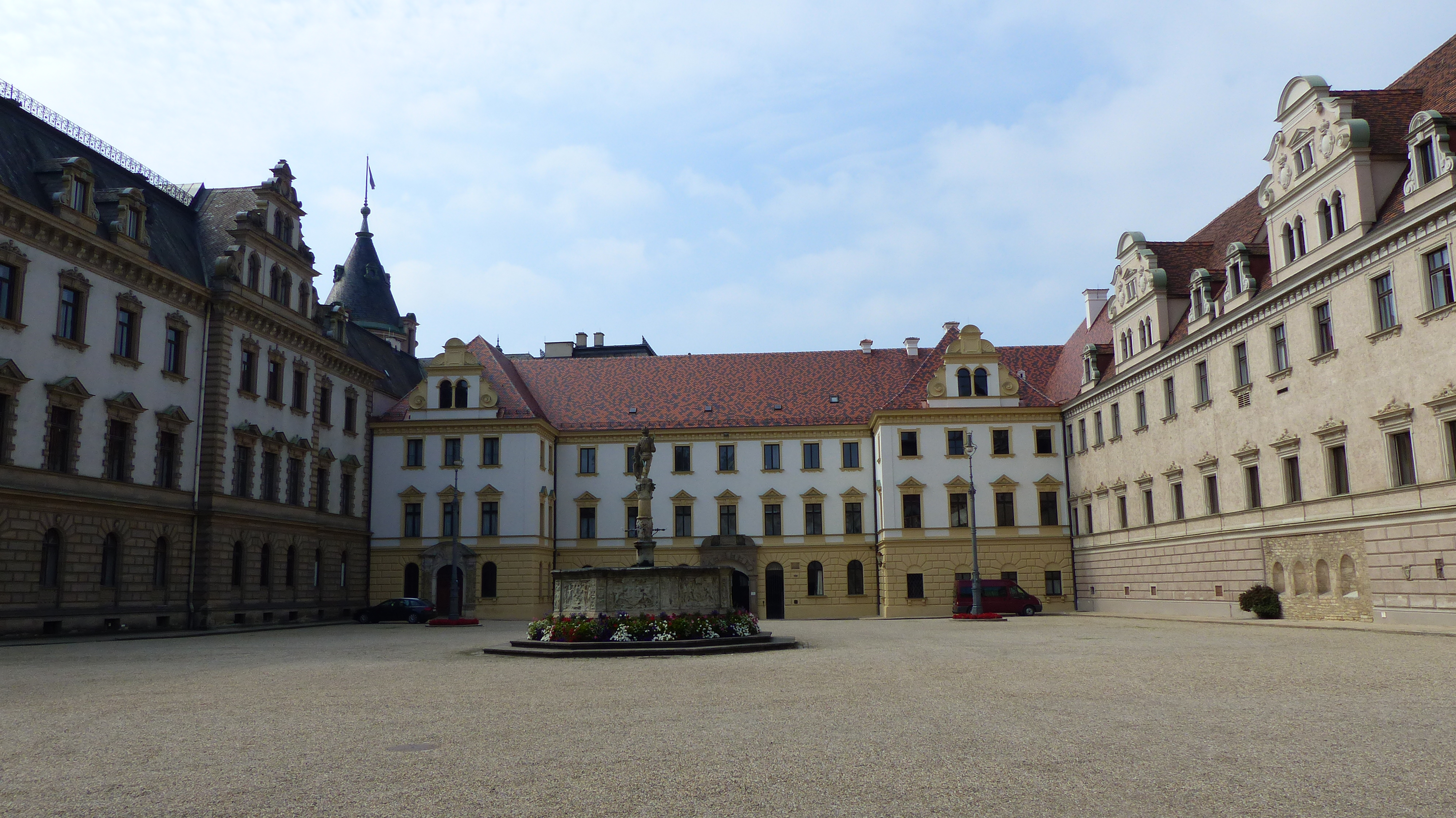
- Old town Regensburg Cathedral Stone Bridge Haidplatz Old town hall Porta praetoria Saint Emmeram's Abbey

- Flag Coat of arms
- Interactive map of Regensburg
- Location within Germany Location within Bavaria
- Coordinates: 49°1′N 12°5′E
- Country: Germany
- State: Bavaria
- District: Urban district
- Subdivisions: 18 districts

Government
  - Mayor (2026–2032): Gertrud Maltz-Schwarzfischer (SPD)

Area
  - Total: 80.76 km^{2} (31.18 sq mi)

Population (2025-12-31)
  - Total: 151,517
  - Density: 1,876/km^{2} (4,859/sq mi)
- Time zone: UTC+01:00 (CET)
  - Summer (DST): UTC+02:00 (CEST)
- Postal codes: 93001–93059
- Dialling codes: 0941
- Vehicle registration: R
- Website: www.regensburg.de

UNESCO World Heritage Site
- Official name: Old town of Regensburg with Stadtamhof
- Criteria: Cultural: ii, iii, iv
- Reference: 1155
- Inscription: 2006 (30th Session)
- Area: 182.8 ha (452 acres)
- Buffer zone: 775.6 ha (1,917 acres)

Regensburg (Note: German: [ˈʁeːɡn̩sbʊʁk]; Bavarian: Rengschburg or Rengschburch; Czech: Řezno) (historically known in English as Ratisbon, /ˈrætɪsbɒn/ RAT-is-bon) (Note: Regensburg has been known in English as Ratisbon, which is still used in traditional and historical contexts. The name is still known in the Romance languages – including French Ratisbonne and Italian, Spanish, and Portuguese Ratisbona – as a cognate of its Latin name of Ratisbona, which is in turn derived from Gaulish Radasbona.) is a city in eastern Bavaria, at the confluence of the rivers Danube, Naab and Regen, Danube's northernmost point. It is the capital of the Upper Palatinate subregion of the state. With more than 150,000 inhabitants, Regensburg is the fourth-largest city in the State of Bavaria after Munich, Nuremberg and Augsburg and the eighth-largest of all cities on the river Danube. From its foundation as an imperial Roman river fort, the city has been the political, economic, and cultural centre of the surrounding region. Later, under the rule of the Holy Roman Empire, it housed the Perpetual Diet of Regensburg.

The medieval centre of the city was made a UNESCO World Heritage Site in 2006 because of its well-preserved architecture, being the biggest medieval city site north of the Alps, and the city's historical importance for assemblies during the Holy Roman Empire. In 2014, Regensburg was among the top sights and travel attractions in Germany.

== History ==
=== Early history ===
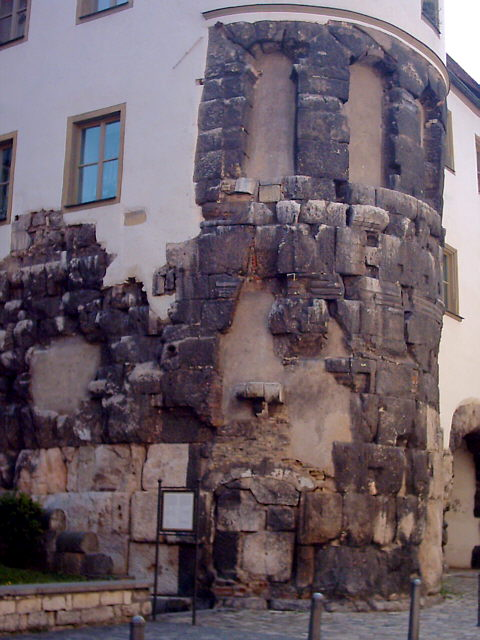
The remains of the East Tower of the Porta Praetoria from Roman times

The first settlements in the Regensburg area date from the Stone Age. The oldest Celtic name given to a settlement near Regensburg was Radasbona, a site where a Roman fort was built around AD 90. In 179, a major new Roman fort, called Castra Regina ("fortress by the river Regen"), was built for Legio III Italica during the reign of Emperor Marcus Aurelius. It was an essential camp at the most northerly point of the Danube; it corresponds to what is today the core of Regensburg's Old City or Altstadt east of the Obere and Untere Bachgasse and west of the Schwanenplatz. It is believed that as early as the late Roman period, the city was the seat of a bishop.

From the early 6th century, Regensburg was the seat of the ruling family, the Agilolfings. From about 530 to the first half of the 13th century, it was the capital of Bavaria. The bishopric established by the Romans was re-established by St Boniface as the Bishopric of Regensburg in 739. In the late 8th century, Regensburg remained an important city during the reign of Charlemagne. In 792, Regensburg hosted the ecclesiastical section of Charlemagne's General Assembly, the bishops in council who condemned the heresy of the nontrinitarian adoptionism doctrine taught by their Spanish counterparts, Elipandus of Toledo and Felix of Urgell. After the partition of the Carolingian Empire in 843, the city became the seat of the Eastern Frankish ruler, Louis the German. Two years later, 14 Bohemian princes came to Regensburg to receive baptism there. This was the starting point of the Christianization of the Czechs, and the diocese of Regensburg became the mother diocese of that of Prague. These events had a wide impact on the cultural history of the Czech lands, as they were consequently part of the Roman Catholic and not the Slavic-Orthodox world. On 8 December 899, Arnulf of Carinthia, a descendant of Charlemagne, died at Regensburg.

By the High Middle Ages in the year 1000, the population increased to 40,000 from 23,000 inhabitants in 800. In 1096, on the way to the First Crusade, Gottschalk (a local priest) led a mob of crusaders who attempted to force the mass conversion of Jews in Regensburg. They then killed all those who resisted. Between 1135 and 1146, the Stone Bridge across the Danube was built at Regensburg. This bridge opened major international trade routes between northern Europe and Venice, thereby beginning Regensburg's golden age as a residence of wealthy trading families. Regensburg became the cultural centre of southern Germany and was celebrated for its gold work and fabrics.

=== Late Middle Ages and early modern period ===
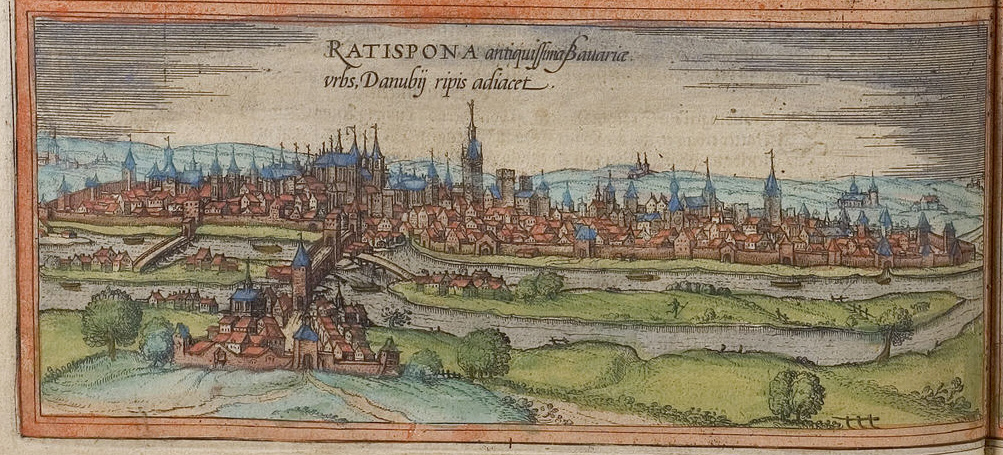
Regensburg in the 16th century

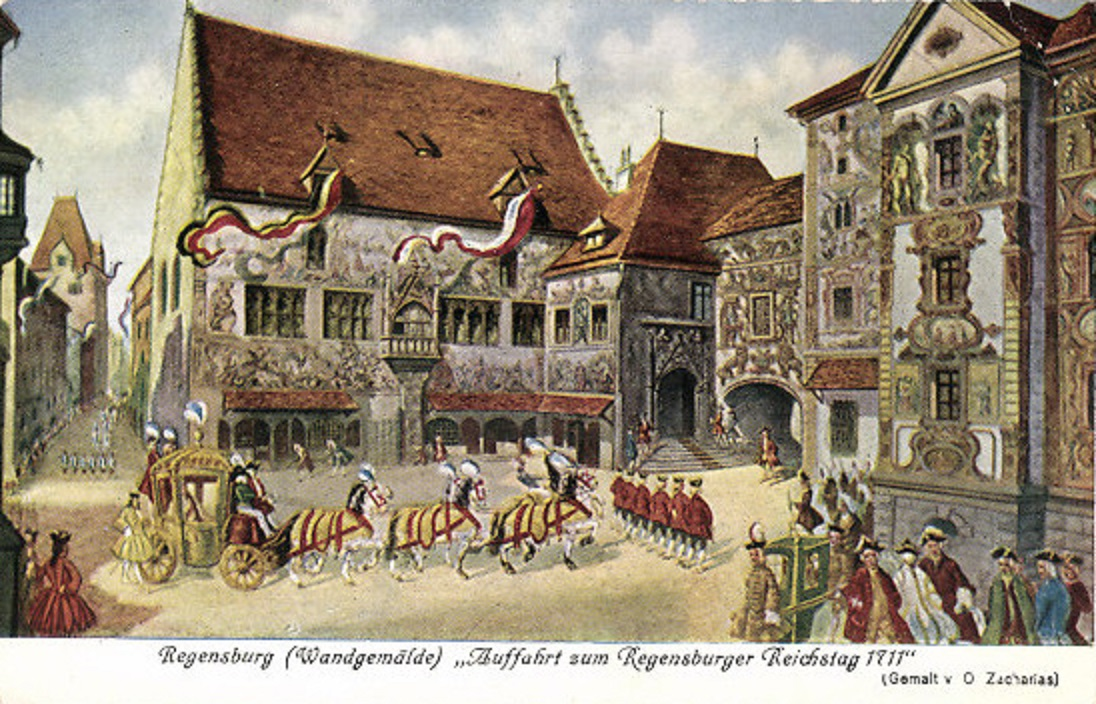
Ceremonial arrival at the Imperial Diet, 1711

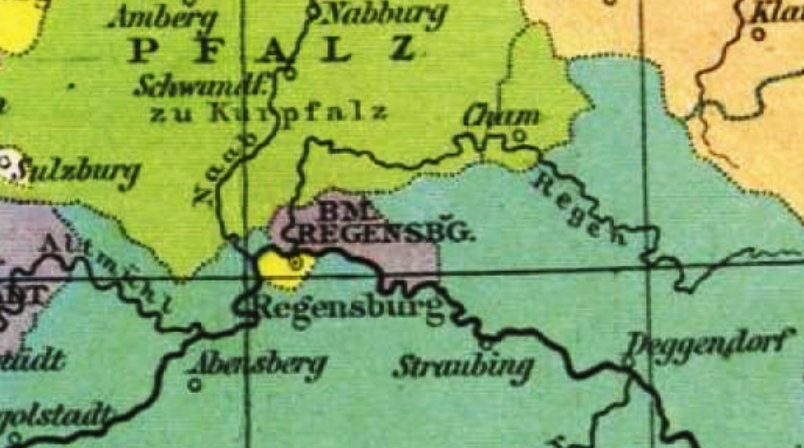
The Free Imperial City (yellow) and the Prince-Bishopric (purple) in the 18th century

In 1245, Regensburg became a Free Imperial City and was a trade centre before the shifting of trade routes in the late Middle Ages. Regensburg has always been a place where international meetings were held. This was also the case in 1471 when a war against the Turks was to be decided. In 1486, Regensburg became part of the Duchy of Bavaria, but its independence was restored by the Holy Roman Emperor ten years later.

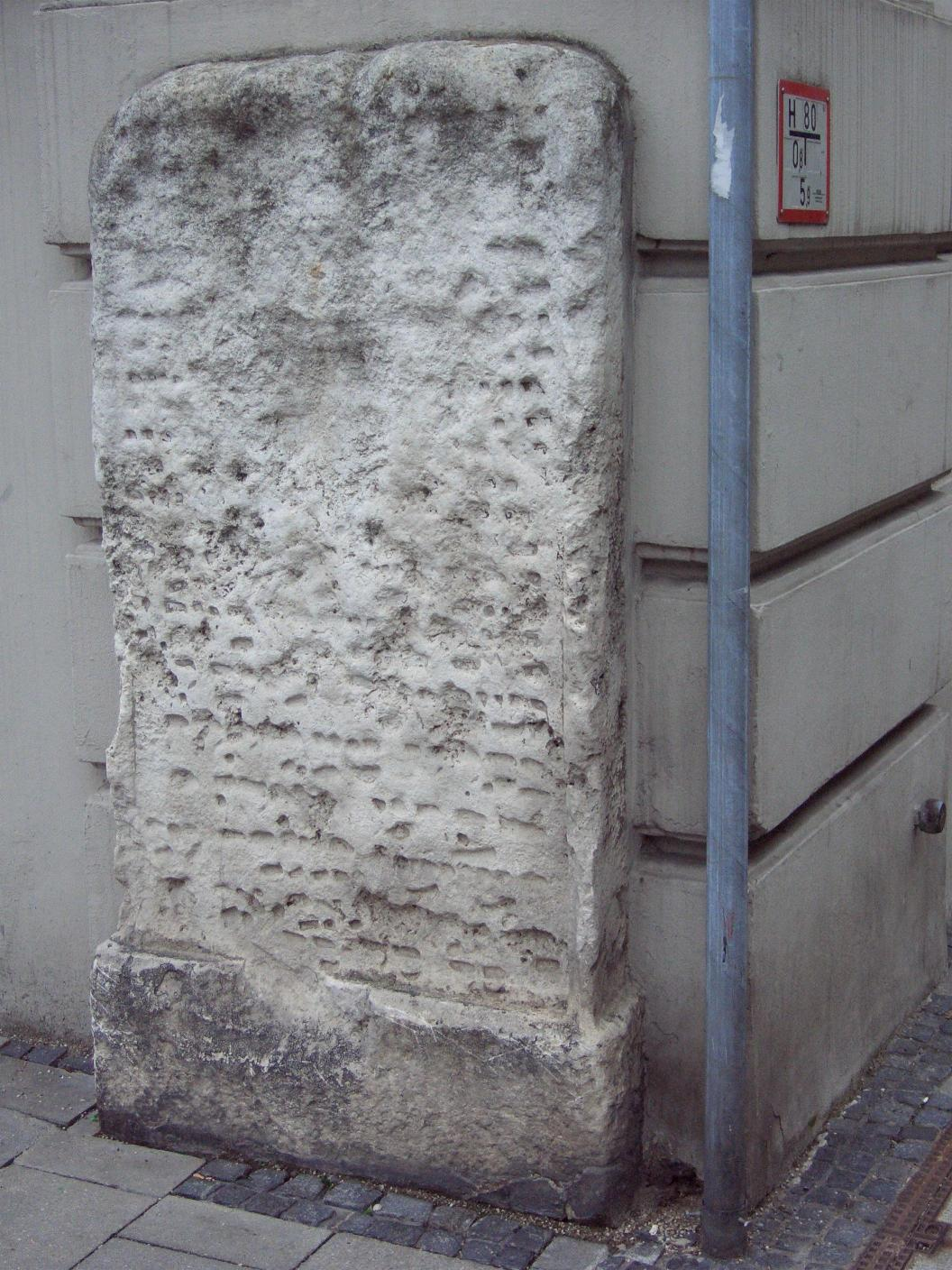
Jewish gravestone at the eponymous middle school

In 1519, the medieval Jewish community of Regensburg — one of the largest and most significant in southern Germany — was expelled following the death of Emperor Maximilian I, who had previously protected the city's Jews. Without imperial oversight, the city council and local guilds moved quickly to remove the community, citing economic grievances and long-standing religious hostility. About 500 Jews were forced to leave the city, their property was confiscated, and the centuries-old synagogue and much of the Jewish quarter were demolished. The medieval Jewish cemetery, one of the oldest in the region, was also destroyed; many of its gravestones were removed, broken, or reused in construction around the city. The 1519 expulsion marked the end of Jewish life in Regensburg for several centuries, until Jews were permitted to resettle in the city in the early modern period.

The first Diet of Regensburg took place in 1541. The city adopted the Protestant Reformation in 1542, and its Town Council remained entirely Lutheran.

From 1663 to 1806, the city was the permanent seat of the Imperial Diet of the Holy Roman Empire, which became known as the Perpetual Diet of Regensburg. Thus, Regensburg was one of the Empire's central towns, attracting large numbers of visitors.

A minority of the population remained Roman Catholic, and Roman Catholics were denied civic rights (Bürgerrecht). Although the Imperial city had adopted the Reformation, the town remained the seat of a Roman Catholic bishop and several abbeys. Three of these, St. Emmeram, Niedermünster and Obermünster, were free imperial estates within the Holy Roman Empire, meaning that they were granted a seat and a vote at the Imperial Diet (Reichstag). So there was the unique situation in which the town of Regensburg comprised five independent "states" (in the Holy Roman Empire): the Protestant city itself, the Roman Catholic bishopric, and the three monasteries. In addition, it was seen as the traditional capital of the region of Bavaria (not the state) and served as a functional co-capital of the Empire (second to the Emperor's court at Vienna) due to the presence of the Perpetual Diet. It was the residence of the Emperor's Commissary-Principal to the same diet, who, with one very brief exception, was a prince himself (for many years the Prince of Thurn and Taxis, still resident in the town).

=== Late modern period ===
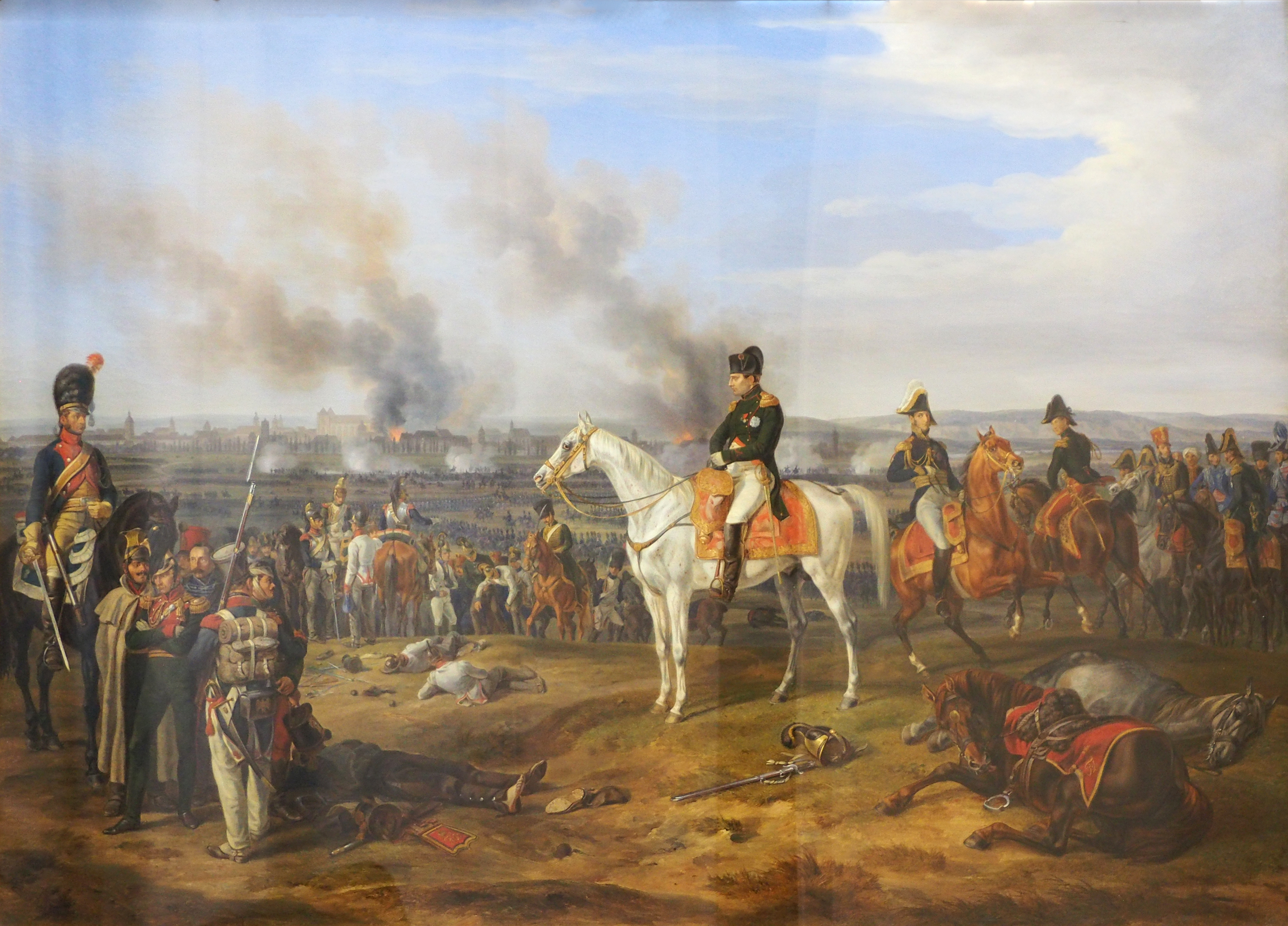
Napoleon at Regensburg in 1809

In 1803, the city lost its status as an imperial city following its incorporation into the Principality of Regensburg. It was handed over to the Archbishop-Elector of Mainz and Archchancellor of the Holy Roman Empire Carl von Dalberg in compensation for the territory of the Electorate of Mainz located on the left bank of the Rhine which had been annexed by France under the terms of the Treaty of Lunéville in 1801. The Archbishopric of Mainz was formally transferred to Regensburg. Dalberg united the bishopric, the monasteries, and the town itself, making up the Principality of Regensburg (Fürstentum Regensburg). Dalberg strictly modernized public life. Most importantly, he awarded equal rights to Protestants and Roman Catholics alike. In 1810, Dalberg ceded Regensburg to the Kingdom of Bavaria, and he himself was compensated by the award of Fulda and Hanau under the title of "Grand Duke of Frankfurt".

Between 19 and 23 April 1809, Regensburg was the scene of the Battle of Ratisbon between forces commanded by Henri Gatien Bertrand and Napoleon himself and the retreating Austrian forces. The city was eventually overrun, after supplies and ammunition ran out. The city suffered severe damage during the fight, with about 150 houses being burnt and others being looted. Robert Browning's poem Incident at the French Camp describes the battle from the French perspective, but is filled with historical errors.

=== Nazism and World War II ===
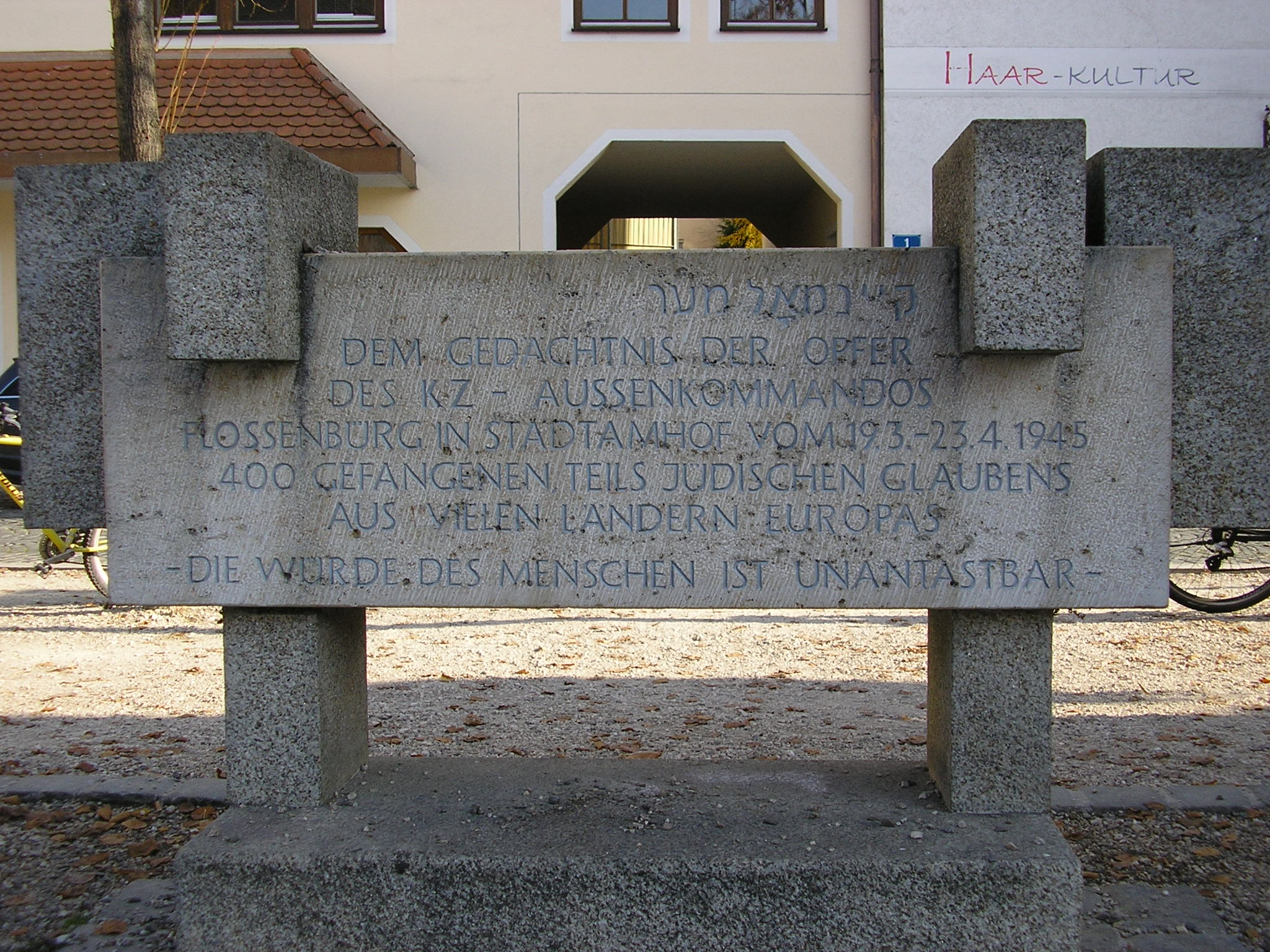
Memorial to the victims of the local subcamp of the Flossenbürg concentration camp

The Jewish community was persecuted after the Nazi Party came to power in Germany in 1933, many Jews fled in the following years, and some were also expelled to Poland; thanks, however, to a Polish-German agreement they were allowed to return to the city. On 9 November 1938, during the Kristallnacht, the Regensburg Synagogue and several Jewish homes and stores were destroyed, and around 220 Jews were arrested, some were also deported to the Dachau concentration camp. During World War II, many Jews emigrated to various countries, and in 1942, over 200 Jews were deported either to Piaski in German-occupied Poland or the Theresienstadt Ghetto in German-occupied Czechoslovakia. In the final months of World War II, in March and April 1945, the Regensburg subcamp of the Flossenbürg concentration camp was located in the city, with 460 forced laborers of various nationalities, 40 of whom died.

Regensburg was home to both a Messerschmitt Bf 109 aircraft factory and an oil refinery, which were bombed by the Allies on 17 August 1943, in the Schweinfurt-Regensburg mission, and on 5 February 1945, during the Oil Campaign of World War II. Although both targets were severely damaged, Regensburg itself suffered minor damage from the Allied strategic bombing campaign, and the nearly intact medieval city centre is listed as a UNESCO World Heritage Site. The city's most important cultural loss was the Romanesque church of Obermünster, which was destroyed in a March 1945 air raid and not rebuilt (the belfry survived). Also, Regensburg's slow economic recovery after the war ensured that historic buildings were not torn down and replaced by newer ones. When the upswing in restoration reached Regensburg in the late 1960s, the prevailing mindset had turned in favour of preserving the city's heritage.

=== History after 1945 ===
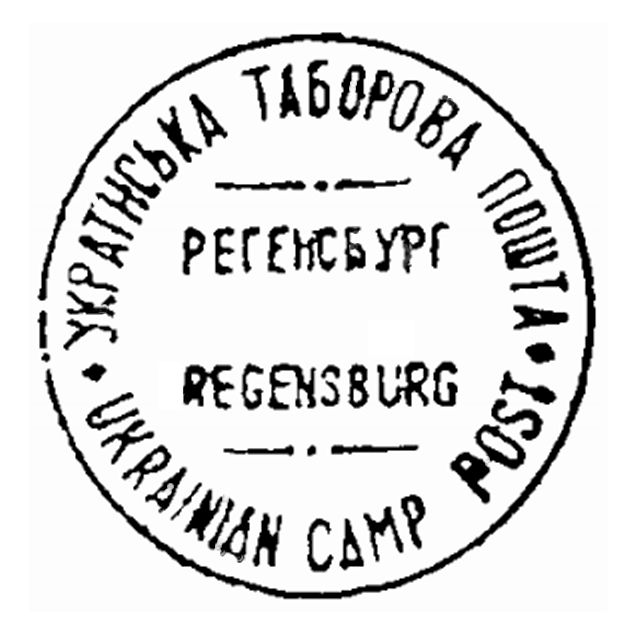
Cancellation by the Ukrainian Camp Post at Regensburg DP Camp

Between 1945 and 1949, Regensburg was the site of the largest displaced persons (DP) camp in Germany. At its peak in 1946–1947, the workers' district of Ganghofersiedlung housed almost 5,000 Ukrainian and 1,000 non-Ukrainian refugees and displaced persons. With the approval of the U.S. Military Government in the American Allied Occupation Zone, Regensburg and other DP camps organised their own camp postal service. In Regensburg, the camp postal service began operation on 11 December 1946.

At the beginning of the 1960s, Regensburg invested heavily in technical and social infrastructure to attract industry. Siemens was the first multinational company to establish a presence in Regensburg, a significant step in the city's post-World War II development. In 1965, Regensburg University was founded; Regensburg University of Applied Sciences was established in 1971. The second multinational company, BMW, arrived in 1986 and set up a large production plant. Since the 1990s, several well-known high-tech companies have been based in Regensburg, including Infineon and OSRAM, contributing to the city's current wealth.

In 1997, Regensburg was awarded the Europe Prize for its outstanding achievements in European integration.

The World Heritage Committee listed Regensburg's Old Town as a UNESCO World Heritage Site in July 2006.

== Geography ==
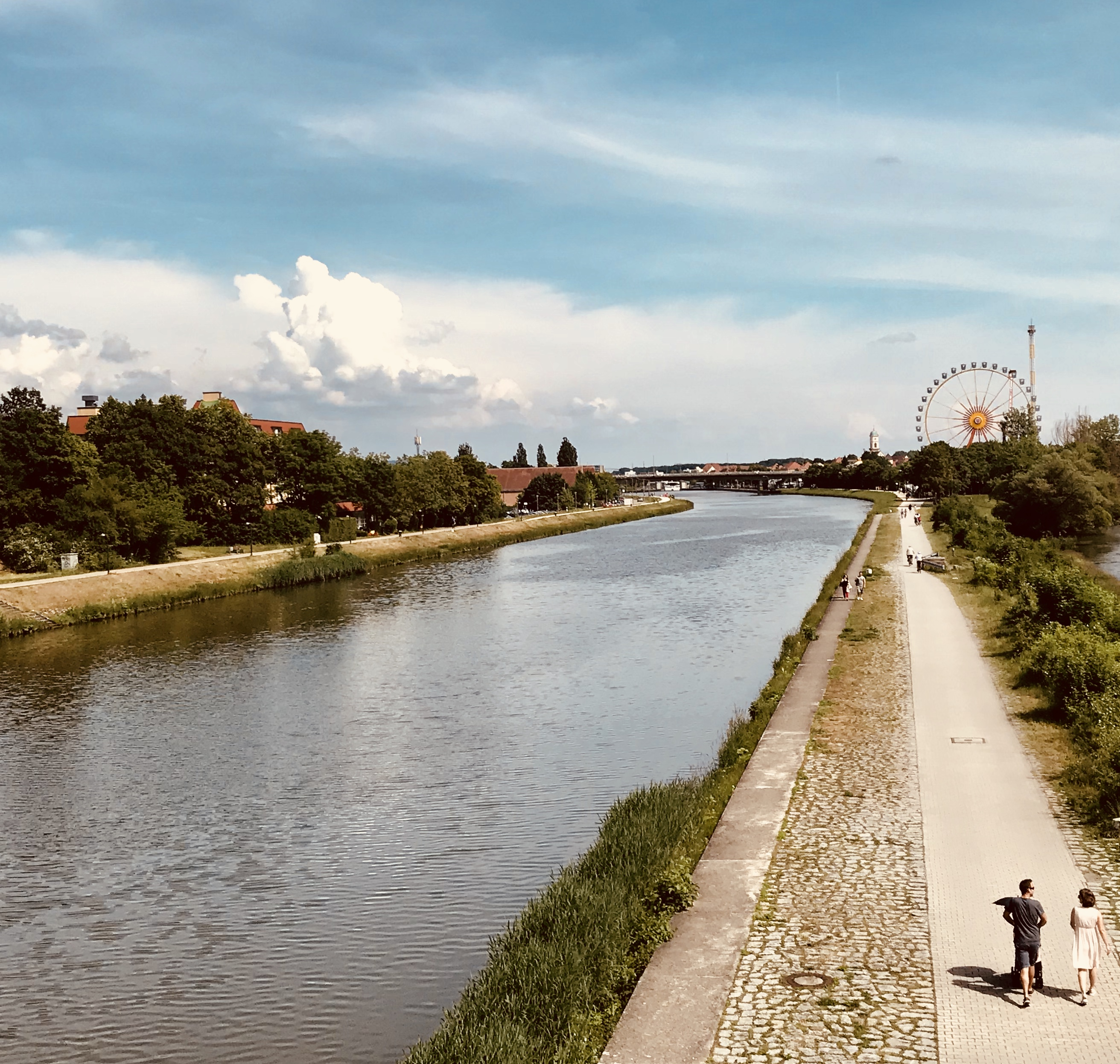
Rhein-Main-Donau Canal at the Stadt-am-Hof locks, Regensburg

=== Topography ===
Regensburg is situated on the northernmost part of the river Danube at the geological crossroads of four distinct landscapes:

- to the north and northeast lies the Bavarian Forest with granite and gneiss mountains, wide forests and its national park
- to the east and southeast is the fertile Danube plain (Gäuboden), which is a highly cultivated loess plain
- the south is dominated by the Tertiary Hill Country, a continuation of Alpine Foreland
- to the West is Franconian Jura

=== Climate ===
Regensburg straddles the humid continental (Dfb) and oceanic (Cfb) climate zones under the Köppen climate classification. While the average temperature of 8.5 °C (47.3 °F) during the period from 1971 to 2000 is slightly above the German average (7.8 °C or 46.0 °F), only 5 of the 80 cities in Germany with more than 100,000 inhabitants are colder. The average precipitation of 636 millimetres (25.0 inches) per year ranges slightly below the German average (approximately 700 millimetres or 28 inches). For the more recent period from 1981 to 2010, the average temperature and precipitation rose to 8.9 °C (48.0 °F) and 658 millimetres (25.9 inches), respectively. Although this increase in average temperature is evident in other cities as well, Regensburg still ranks fifth (shared with Ingolstadt and Kiel) in the ranking above. With a total of 1670 sunshine hours per year, Regensburg is roughly 120 hours above German average.

The warmest month of the year, on average, is July. On average, the coolest month of the year is January.

Climate data for Regensburg (1991–2020 normals)
Month	Jan	Feb	Mar	Apr	May	Jun	Jul	Aug	Sep	Oct	Nov	Dec	Year
Mean daily maximum °C (°F)	2.3 (36.1)	4.7 (40.5)	10.3 (50.5)	16.5 (61.7)	20.7 (69.3)	24.2 (75.6)	26.1 (79.0)	25.8 (78.4)	20.3 (68.5)	13.9 (57.0)	6.9 (44.4)	2.9 (37.2)	14.6 (58.3)
Daily mean °C (°F)	−0.4 (31.3)	0.7 (33.3)	4.9 (40.8)	9.7 (49.5)	14.2 (57.6)	17.6 (63.7)	19.3 (66.7)	18.9 (66.0)	14.1 (57.4)	9.0 (48.2)	4.0 (39.2)	0.6 (33.1)	9.4 (48.9)
Mean daily minimum °C (°F)	−2.9 (26.8)	−2.5 (27.5)	0.5 (32.9)	3.8 (38.8)	8.1 (46.6)	11.7 (53.1)	13.4 (56.1)	13.2 (55.8)	9.2 (48.6)	5.3 (41.5)	1.5 (34.7)	−1.6 (29.1)	5.0 (41.0)
Average precipitation mm (inches)	48.3 (1.90)	37.1 (1.46)	43.6 (1.72)	35.9 (1.41)	60.2 (2.37)	80.0 (3.15)	76.9 (3.03)	73.3 (2.89)	49.9 (1.96)	49.0 (1.93)	48.1 (1.89)	54.3 (2.14)	660.1 (25.99)
Average precipitation days (≥ 1.0 mm)	16.6	14.4	14.5	11.6	14.4	14.5	15.3	13.4	12.8	14.4	14.7	17.7	174.8
Average snowy days (≥ 1.0 cm)	14.8	13.2	3.8	0.1	0	0	0	0	0	0	2.2	8.8	42.9
Average relative humidity (%)	87.3	82.8	75.9	68.8	70.3	70.7	70.5	72.3	79.4	85.9	89.8	90.1	78.6
Mean monthly sunshine hours	47.6	80.1	131.2	186.5	215.7	225.6	234.4	221.2	158.6	97.5	45.0	37.8	1,681.2
Source: World Meteorological Organization

== Main sights ==
=== City ===
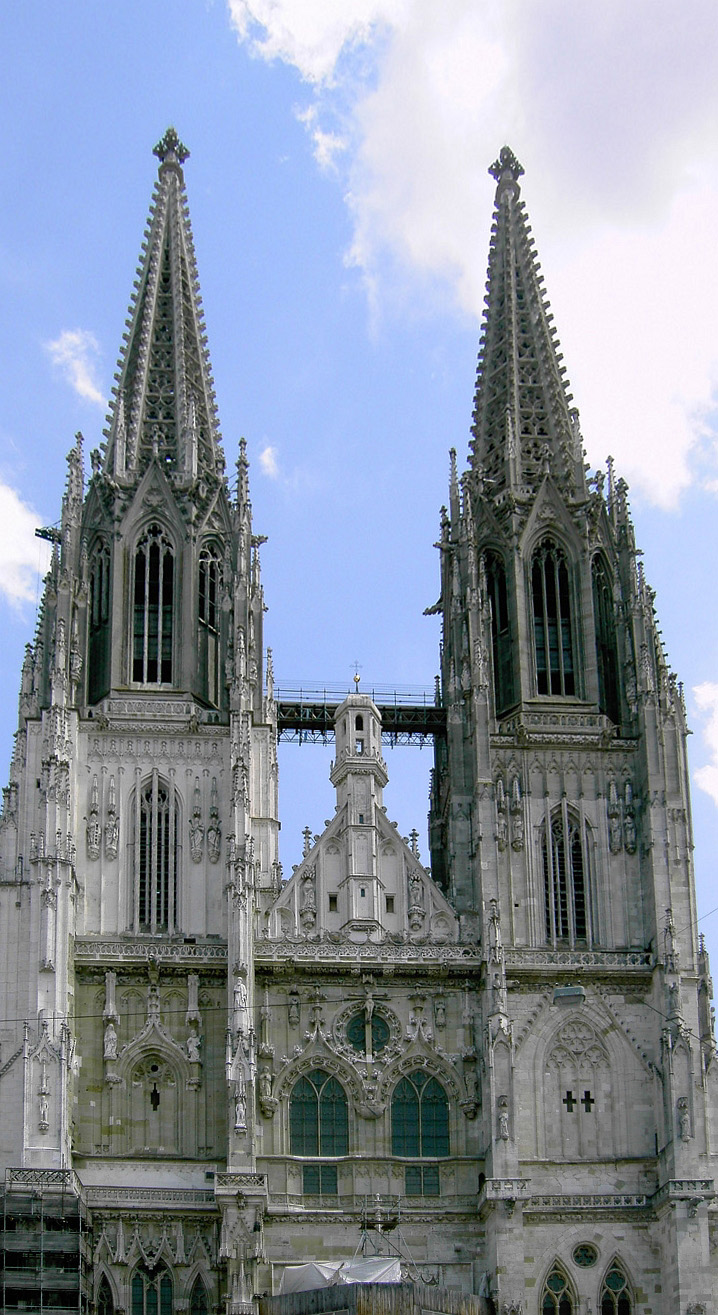
St. Peter's Church – the Regensburg Cathedral

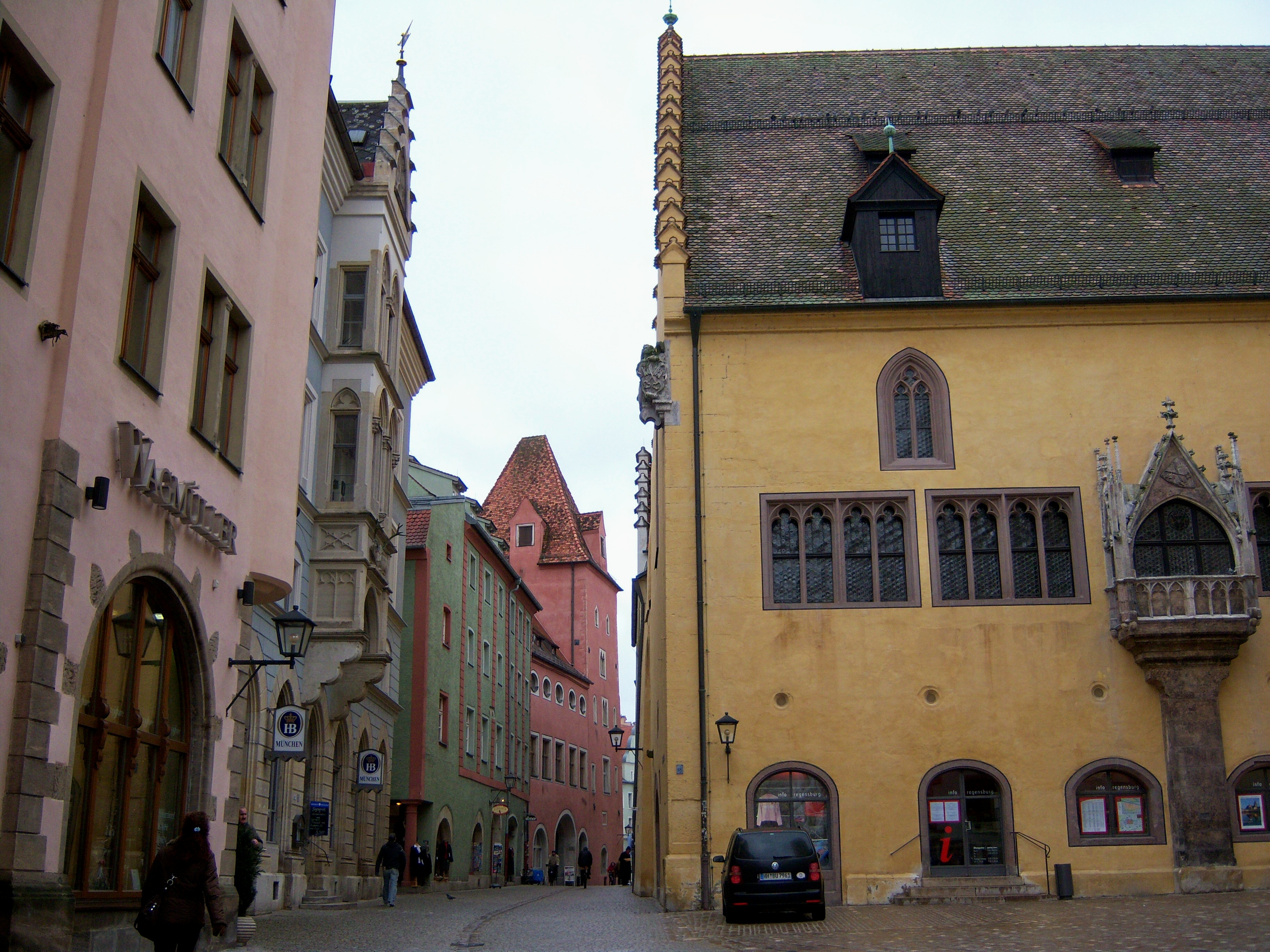
Kohlenmarkt with Town Hall, site of the Perpetual Diet from 1663 to 1806

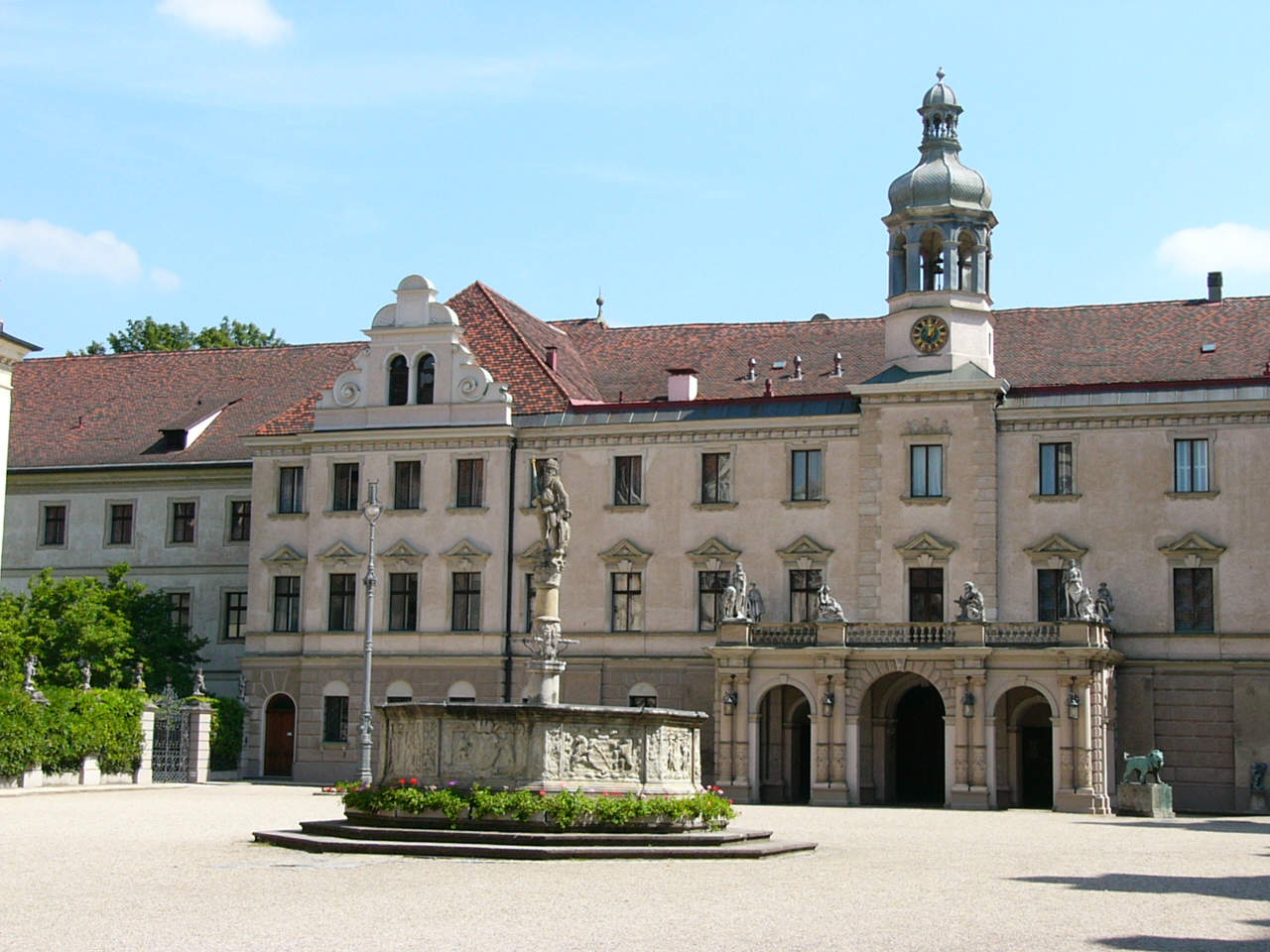
St. Emmeram's Abbey, now Schloss Thurn und Taxis, a huge palace

Regensburg includes the largest medieval old town north of the Alps with nearly 1,500 listed buildings and a picturesque cityscape. Its most famous sights are located mainly in the Old Town, such as:

- The Dom (Cathedral) is an example of pure German Gothic and is regarded as the main work of Gothic architecture in Bavaria. It was founded in 1275 and completed in 1634, except for the towers, which were finished in 1869. The interior contains numerous interesting monuments, including one of Peter Vischer's masterpieces. Adjoining the cloisters are two chapels which predate the cathedral. One of these, known as the old cathedral, goes back perhaps to the 8th century. The official choir for the liturgical music at St Peter's Cathedral is the famous Regensburger Domspatzen ("cathedral sparrows").
- The stone bridge, built 1135–1146, is a highlight of medieval bridge building. The knights of the 2nd and 3rd crusades used it to cross the Danube on their way to the Holy Land.
- The Regensburg Sausage Kitchen is a major tourist destination, but locals eat there as well. It was initially built as the construction headquarters of the stone bridge and now lies adjacent to it.
- Remains of the Roman fortress's walls, including the Porta Praetoria.
- The Church of St. James, also called Schottenkirche, a Romanesque basilica of the 12th century, derives its name from the monastery of Irish Benedictines (Scoti) to which it was attached; the principal doorway is covered with very unusual grotesque carvings. It stands next to the Jakobstor, a medieval city gate named after it.
- The old parish church of St. Ulrich is a good example of the Transition style of the 13th century, and contains a valuable antiquarian collection. It houses the diocesan museum of religious art.
- Examples of the Romanesque basilica style are the church of Obermünster, dating from 1010, and the abbey church of St. Emmeram, built in the 13th century, is remarkable as one of the few German churches with a detached bell tower. The cloisters of the ancient abbey, one of the oldest in Germany, are still in a fair state of preservation. In 1809, the conventional buildings were converted into a palace for the prince of Thurn and Taxis, hereditary postmaster-general of the Holy Roman Empire.
- The Adler-Apotheke, located near Regensburg Cathedral, was founded in 1610 and is one of the oldest pharmacies in Regensburg. The ancient interior and historical vessels can be viewed.
- Wealthy patrician families competed against each other to see who could build the highest tower in the city. In 1260, the Goldener Turm (golden tower) was built on Wahlenstrasse.
- The Old Town Hall, dating in part from the 14th century, contains the rooms occupied by the Imperial Diet from 1663 to 1806.
- The Gasthof zum Goldenen Kreuz (Golden Cross Inn) is also of historical interest: it is where Charles V made the acquaintance of Barbara Blomberg, the mother of Don John of Austria.
- The statue of John of Austria, born 1547 in Regensburg, was erected in 1978 on the fourth centenary of his death and is a copy of a monument in Messina, Italy.
- Perhaps the most pleasant modern building in the city is the Gothic villa of the king of Bavaria on the bank of the Danube. The grounds are now open to the public and known as VillaPark.
- Among the public institutions of the city are the public library, picture gallery, botanical garden, and the institute for the making of stained glass. The city's colleges (apart from the University of Regensburg) include an episcopal clerical seminary, and a school of church music.
- St. Emmeram's Abbey, now known as Schloss Thurn und Taxis, is a huge castle owned by the powerful Thurn and Taxis family.
- Schloss Höfling, a castle owned by the Thurn und Taxis family
- The City Park, the oldest and largest park in Regensburg, has a lot of artwork.
- The Botanischer Garten der Universität Regensburg is a modern botanical garden located on the University of Regensburg campus.
- Herzogspark also contains several small botanical gardens.

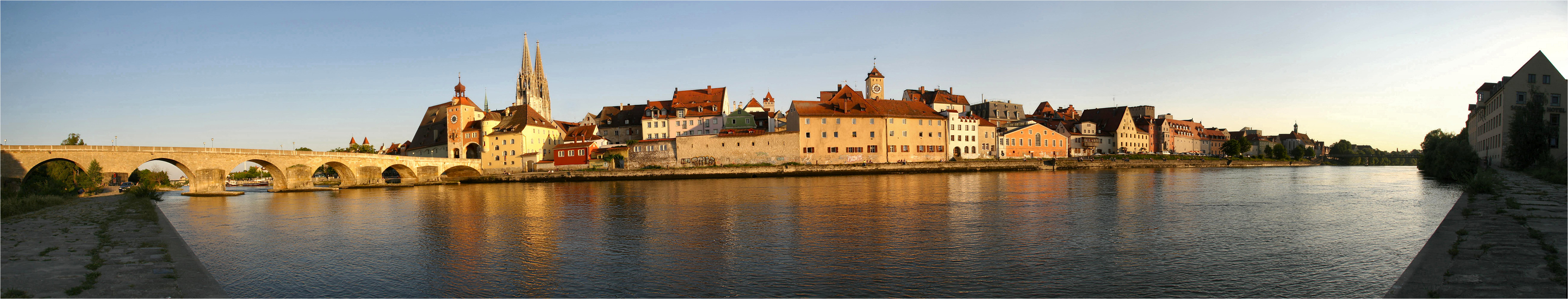
The Stone Bridge, St. Peter's Church and the Old Town of Regensburg

=== Surroundings ===
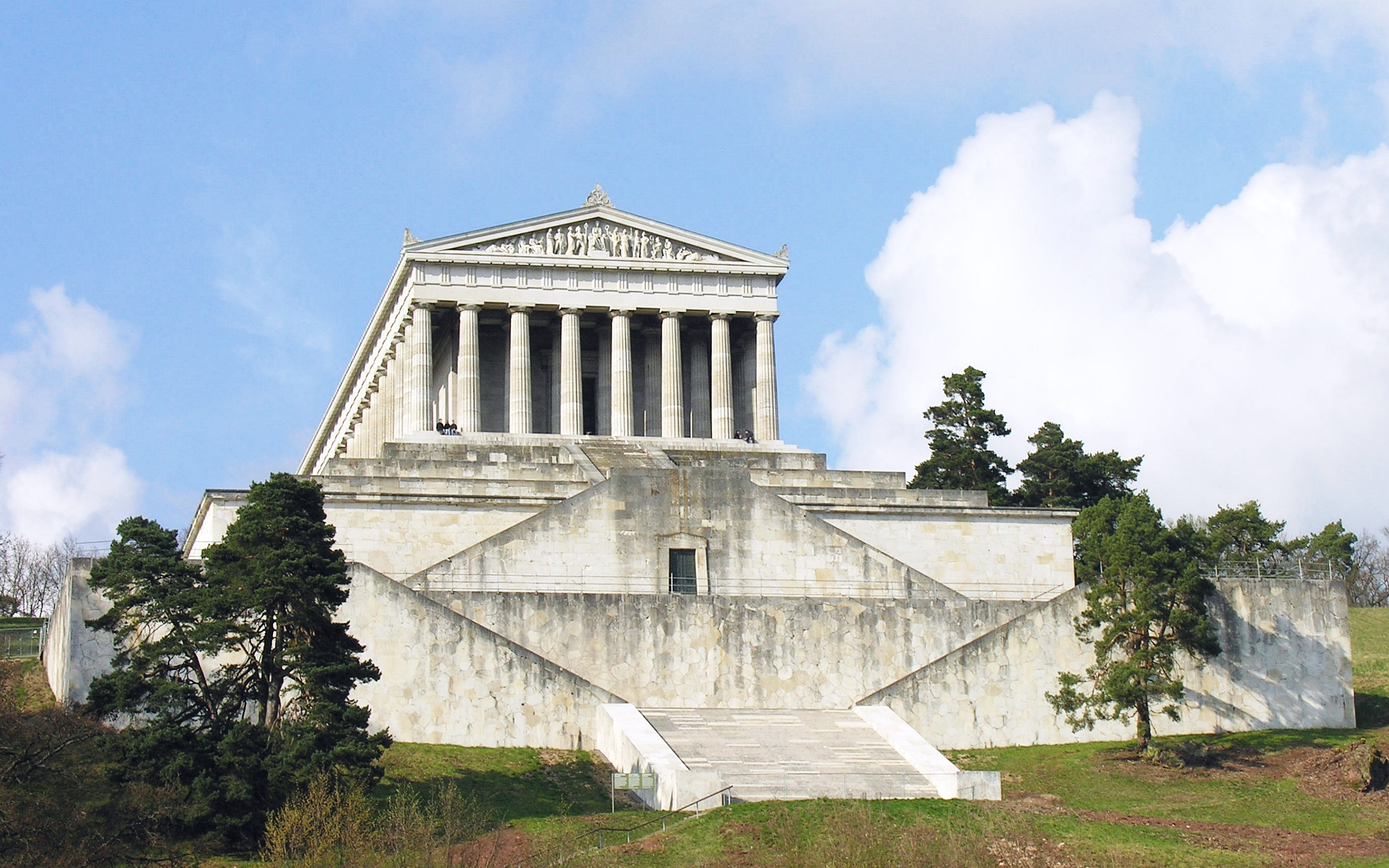
Klenze's Walhalla, built in 1842

Near Regensburg, there are two classical buildings erected by Ludwig I of Bavaria as national monuments dedicated to German patriotism and greatness:

- The more imposing of the two is the Walhalla, a costly reproduction of the Parthenon, erected as a Teutonic temple of fame on a hill rising from the Danube at Donaustauf, 10 kilometres (6.2 miles) to the east. The interior, which is richly decorated with coloured marble, gilding and sculptures, contains the busts of more than one hundred notable Germans.
- The second of King Ludwig's buildings is the Befreiungshalle at Kelheim, 25 kilometres (16 miles) higher up the Danube. It is a large circular monument built for the glorification of the heroes of the 1813 War of Liberation.

Weltenburg Abbey (Kloster Weltenburg), a Benedictine monastery, is located in Weltenburg near the town of Kelheim. The abbey is situated on a peninsula of the Danube, by what are known as the "Weltenburg Narrows" or "Danube Gorge". The monastery, founded by Irish or Scottish monks in about 620, is said to be the oldest monastery in Bavaria.

To the east of Regensburg lies the Bavarian Forest and its National Park, one of the most visited protected areas in Germany.

Regensburg is on a designated heritage route, the Route of Emperors and Kings.

== Culture ==
=== Museums and exhibitions ===
There are 20 museums in Regensburg. The Regensburg Museum of History covers the history, culture, and arts of Regensburg and Eastern Bavaria from the Stone Age to the present. The Imperial Diet Museum (Reichstagsmuseum) in the Old Town Hall presents life during the Holy Roman Empire. Its main attractions are an original torture chamber and the Reichssaal, the rooms occupied by the Imperial Diet from 1663 to 1806. The Kepler Memorial House (Keplergedächtnishaus) illustrates the life of the famous astronomer and mathematician Johannes Kepler. The Municipal Art Gallery (Leerer Beutel) hosts art exhibitions, film screenings, and cultural festivals. The city has also added several outdoor museums, known as "Document" sites, that provide overviews of topics such as Roman, Jewish, and Bavarian history.

In addition, there are the Diocese Museums (Bistumsmuseen) of Regensburg and a branch of the Bavarian National Museum located in St. Emmeram's Abbey, which contains the Princely Treasure Chamber of the Thurn und Taxis family. The Domschatzmuseum, where church treasures, monstrances, and tapestries are displayed, is in St. Peter's Cathedral. Other museums include the Kunstforum Ostdeutsche Galerie, the Naturkundemuseum Ostbayern, the Reptile Zoo, the Regensburg Museum of Danube Shipping (Donau-Schiffahrts-Museum), the Public Observatory Regensburg, as well as the Watch Museum (Uhrenmuseum), the Golf Museum, the Post Museum, and the Dinoraeum. To celebrate its centenary in 2018, the State of Bavaria opened the Museum of Bavarian History in Regensburg. In 2023, a Dackelmuseum (Dachshund museum) opened. There are also guided tours of most of Regensburg's historical monuments, as well as organized city tours available in several languages.

=== Theaters ===
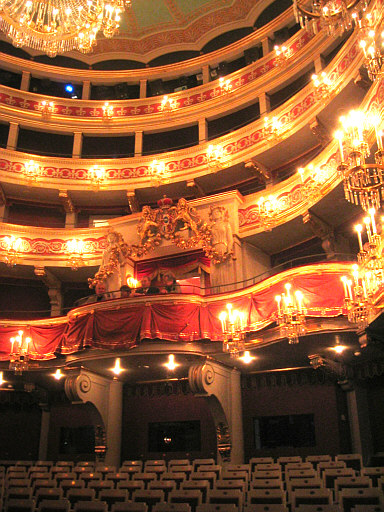
Inside Regensburg Theater

The Theater Regensburg on the Bismarckplatz was established in 1804 and is the city's most important theater. Operas, operettas, musicals, and ballets are performed there. In the summer, open-air performances also take place. While the theater on the Bismarckplatz is the city's oldest and largest, the Theater Regensburg also has four other stages with programmes that complement each other. In the theater's Neuhaussaal on the Bismarckplatz, the Philharmonic Orchestra Regensburg performs. The Velodrom Theater presents musicals and plays. At the Haidplatz Theater, mainly literary and modern plays are performed, whereas the Turmtheater at the Goliathplatz puts on cabarets, musicals, plays for children, and modern plays.

=== Music ===
Regensburg is home to the famous Regensburger Domspatzen, the cathedral choir that specializes in liturgy but has toured internationally with a wide variety of music. The Regensburger Schlossfestspiele has been held in the inner courtyard of the St. Emmeram's Abbey every July from 2003, sponsored by the former princely house of Thurn und Taxis. Meanwhile, those were attracting musicians like Elton John, David Garrett, Tom Jones, or Plácido Domingo. Modern music styles, especially jazz, are presented every summer during the Bavarian Jazz weekend, during which over a hundred bands, combos, and soloists perform in the Old Town. In 2015, the House of Music was opened, giving a home to skilled musicians and their education.

=== Film and cinema ===
The international short film season is hosted annually in Regensburg. It is a non-profit event held every March and is among the most important of its kind in Germany. Aside, there are several cinemas, such as CinemaxX, the largest, which shows blockbusters and arthouse films, and smaller independent cinemas such as Garbo, Ostentor Kino and Regina Filmtheater. Regensburg has two open-air cinemas as well.

=== Dialect ===
Although the German language is Germany's official language, Regensburg is considered a part of the Bavarian dialect language area (bairischer Sprachraum) which encompasses much of Bavaria, Austria, and the South Tyrolean region of northern Italy. More specifically, the dialect attributed to Regensburg is called Central Bavarian (Mittelbairisch). A 2019 report estimates that about half of Bavaria's 12 million inhabitants speak a variation of the Bavarian dialect.

The first dictionary of a German dialect was Johann Ludwig Prasch's Glossarium Bavaricum. Published in Regensburg in 1689, it contains 500 words from the Bavarian variation spoken in Regensburg. Regensburg's Bauerntheater, a type of farmers' or folk theater, has staged plays delivered in Bavarian for over 90 years. Moreover, premiering in 2011, Joseph Berlinger's play "Mei Fähr Lady", a story about three "students" taking a crash course in Bavarian dialect, has been performed at Regensburg's Turmtheater over 300 times. In fact, the role of the dialect professor is played by Ludwig Zehetner, professor emeritus in Bavarian dialectology at University of Regensburg. Manfred Rohm, whose pen name Sepp Grantelhauer takes on the Bavarian verb granteln for "to complain", wrote a weekly satirical column solely in Bavarian for the Regensburger Rundschau.

=== Buildings ===
The Old Town of Regensburg, with nearly 1,500 listed buildings, offers a rich cultural diversity from Roman to modern times.

=== Recreation ===
The Old Town of Regensburg is surrounded by a green belt. Numerous inner-city parks, such as the City Park (Stadtpark), the Herzogspark, the Dörnbergpark, the Villapark, or the university's botanical garden, are sources of recreation and leisure.

=== Memorial sites ===
The city of Regensburg has erected several memorials to combat racism, intolerance towards minorities, and all other forms of contempt for human dignity:

- Memorial for victims of the Holocaust
- Memorial for victims of forced "euthanasia"
- Memorial for concentration camp inmates and prisoners of war
- Memorial for violence against women

Particular to Regensburg are the so-called Stolpersteine (stumbling stones) in honor of Jews deported during Nazism.

=== Events ===
Twice a year, the Regensburg Dult takes place. This is the city's Volksfest, Bavaria's fourth-largest. The Bürgerfest (citizen celebration) in the Old Town is held every two years and attracts over 100,000 visitors. Every second weekend in July, people dressed as knights and other medieval characters come together at the Regensburg Spectaculum, a medieval market, near the Stone Bridge. Every December, there are several Christmas markets all over the city.

== Demographics ==
=== Population ===
In 2023, Regensburg had 178,577 inhabitants, making it the fourth largest city in Bavaria. Over the last hundred years, the city's population has grown rapidly, exceeding 100,000 in 1945 due to the influx of Germans who were expelled from various Eastern and Central European countries at the end of the war. Today, Regensburg is one of the fastest-growing cities in Germany.

=== International communities ===
As of 2024, just over 22% of the total population was of foreign origin. As of 2022, most came from Ukraine, the Middle East and Southeastern Europe:

Country	Population (31.12.2022)
Ukraine	3,083
Romania	2,557
Syria	2,448
Bulgaria	2,235
Turkey	1,459
Croatia	1,306
India	1,076
Poland	1,047
Iraq	1,035
Italy	1,027
Total:	34,160

=== Religion ===
A relative majority of Regensburg's population is Catholic. In 2020, about 48% of the city's inhabitants identified with the Catholic Church, 12.4% were registered Protestants, and about 39.6% identified with other religions or had no registered religious affiliation.

== Politics ==
The city of Regensburg falls within the Regensburg electoral district, a constituency of the German federal parliament in Berlin (the Bundestag).

=== Government ===
The mayor and the City Council are elected for a period of six years. Both elections take place at the same time. The City Council is composed of 51 members and includes the mayor, two deputy mayors, five counsellors, and the other council members.

The municipal elections in Bavaria of 2020 delivered the following results:

Party	votes	change	seats	change	cooperation
Social Democratic Party	12.2%	-21.5	7		
Christian Social Union	32.8%	-7.1	13		
The Greens	21.7%	+11.2	11		
Free Voters	5.9%	-1.0	3		
Ecological Democratic Party	7.2%	+0.8	3	-	
BRÜCKE	12.4%	+12.4	6		
Others	15.0%		8		

=== Boroughs ===
Regensburg is subdivided into 18 boroughs (Stadtbezirke): Innenstadt, Stadtamhof, Steinweg-Pfaffenstein, Sallern-Gallingkofen, Konradsiedlung-Wutzlhofen, Brandlberg-Keilberg, Reinhausen, Weichs, Schwabelweis, Ostenviertel, Kasernenviertel, Galgenberg, Kumpfmühl-Ziegetsdorf-Neuprüll, Großprüfening-Dechbetten-Königswiesen, Westenviertel, Ober- und Niederwinzer-Kager, Oberisling-Graß, Burgweinting-Harting. Each borough contains several localities (Ortsteile), which may have historic roots in former municipalities that were urbanized and incorporated into the city.

== Twin towns – sister cities ==
Regensburg is twinned with:

- Aberdeen, Scotland (1955)
- Brixen, Italy (1969)
- Clermont-Ferrand, France (1969)
- Tempe, United States (1976)
- Plzeň, Czech Republic (1993)
- Odesa, Ukraine (1980)
- Budavár (Budapest), Hungary (2005)
- Qingdao, China (2009)

== Economy ==
Regensburg's economy ranks among the most dynamic and fastest-growing in Germany. Focus is on manufacturing industries, such as automotive, industrial and electrical engineering.

=== Companies ===
There are several multinational corporations located in Regensburg, such as BMW, Continental, E.ON, General Electric, Infineon, Osram, Schneider Electric, Siemens, Telekom, Vitesco Technologies, SGB-SMIT and Toshiba as well as hidden champions (Krones, MR).

BMW operates an automobile production plant in Regensburg; the Regensburg BMW plant produces 3 Series, 1 Series and (previously) Z4 vehicles. Continental AG, with the headquarters of its car component business, Osram Opto-Semiconductors, SGB-SMIT Group transformers, and Siemens, as well as Infineon, the former Siemens semiconductor branch, provide a high level of innovation and technical development in Regensburg. Other well-known international companies, such as AREVA, Schneider Electric, and Toshiba, have built plants in or near Regensburg. GE Aviation founded a greenfield site to innovate, develop, and produce turbine machinery components with a new manufacturing casting technology. Amazon.com located its first German customer service centre in Regensburg. The hidden champions Maschinenfabrik Reinhausen (MR) and Krones are both headquartered in or near Regensburg and are major employers.

Aside from the industrial sector, tourism has contributed significantly to Regensburg's economic growth, especially since 2006, when the city was designated a UNESCO World Heritage Site. The University of Regensburg, the Regensburg University of Applied Sciences, and mercantile trade also play significant roles in Regensburg's economy. Increasingly, biotech companies have been founded in Regensburg over the last two decades, with their headquarters and laboratories in the city's "BioPark". Another focus is on information technology, with the city running a start-up centre for IT firms. One of these former start-ups, CipSoft, is now a well-known video game company still based in Regensburg.

OTTI, the Eastern Bavaria Technology Transfer-Institut e.V., is headquartered in Regensburg.

=== Tourism ===
The city recorded 912,238 overnight hotel stays and 531,943 hotel guests in 2012. Tourism figures have nearly doubled within the last 15 years, and Regensburg has become one of the most-visited German cities, with a population of 100,000 to 500,000 residents. In 2014, Regensburg was ranked among the Top 30 travel attractions in Germany by international tourists.

== Infrastructure ==
=== Transport ===
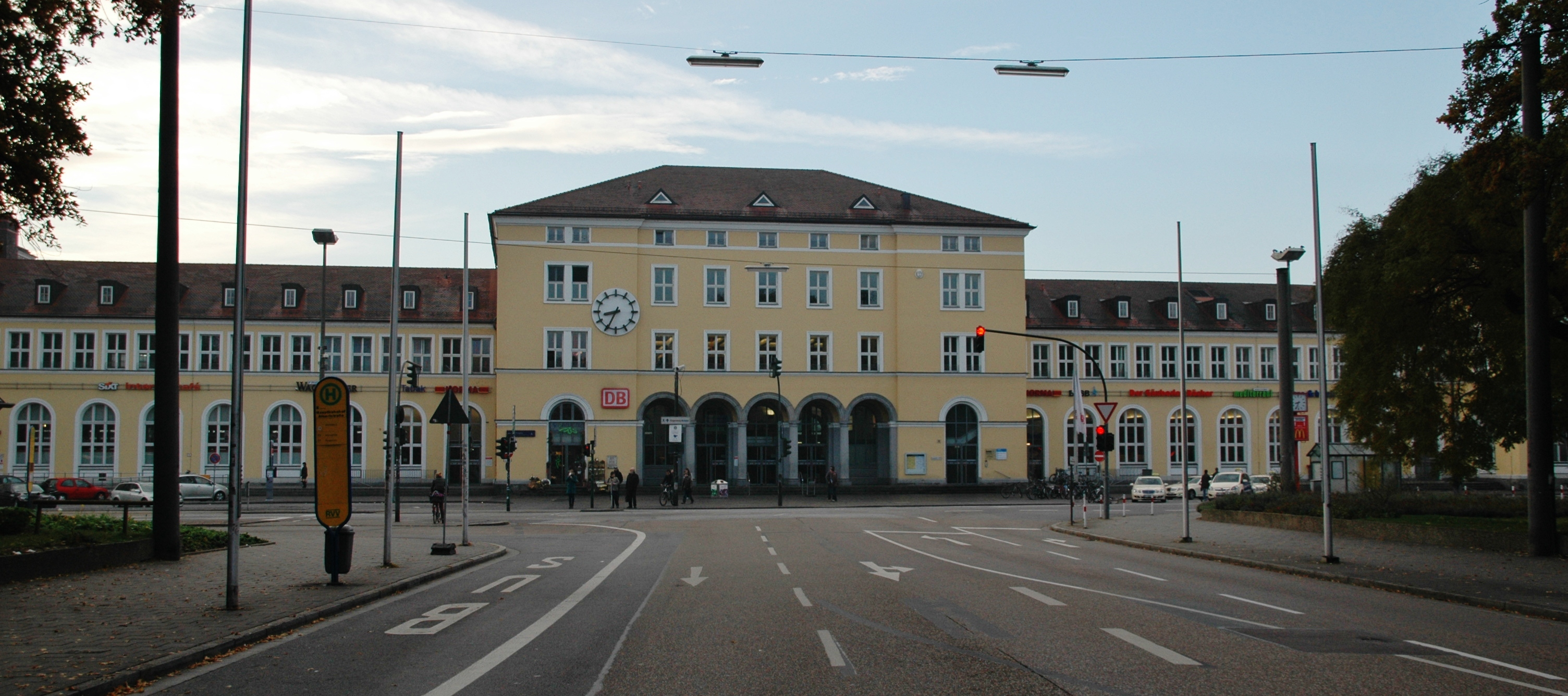
Main railway station

Regensburg Hauptbahnhof (central station) is connected to lines to Munich, Nuremberg, Passau, Weiden and Hof and Ingolstadt and Ulm. The city lies also on two motorways, the A3 from Cologne and Frankfurt to Vienna, and the A93 from Holledau to Hof.

The local transport is provided by a bus network run by the RVV (Regensburger Verkehrsverbund).

The city does not own its airport. The nearest airports are:

- Munich Airport (101 km away)
- Nuremberg Airport (105 km away)

=== Energy ===
Regensburg's energy is mainly supplied by the German company E.ON, one of the world's largest electric utility service providers. Its subsidiary Bayernwerk runs the local hydropower station in the Danube. In 2012, about 9.1% of the total electricity consumption was generated by renewable energy sources, about 5.1% of the total heat consumption were generated by renewables. Both figures show, that Regensburg is behind other Bavarian cities in this context. Therefore, the municipal government presented an energy plan in 2014 that should enhance the transition to renewable energy sources over the next decade.

=== Health ===
Regensburg has one of the most modern university hospitals in Europe, the Universitätsklinikum Regensburg. In addition, there are several other well-known hospitals such as the Krankenhaus Barmherzige Brüder and the St. Josef-Krankenhaus. Psychiatric illnesses are treated in the Bezirksklinikum. With 19.4 hospital beds per 1000 residents, Regensburg has the fourth-highest ratio of beds to residents in Germany as well as the third-highest ratio of medical doctors to residents in Germany (339 per 100,000 residents).

The city's BioPark, home to Bavaria's second largest biotech cluster, hosts numerous research institutions and biotech companies.

== Education ==
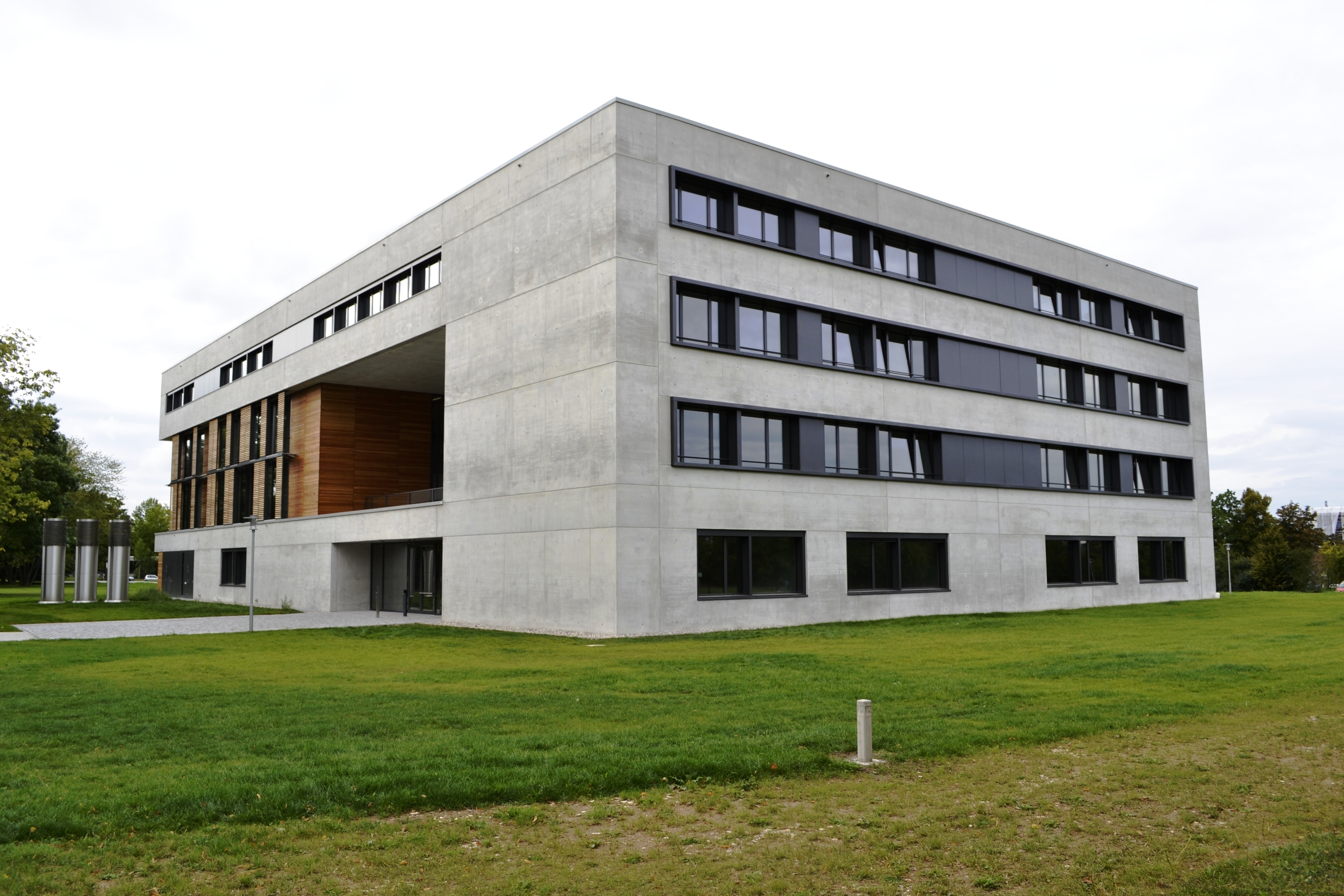
University of Regensburg, Vielberth building, faculty of business

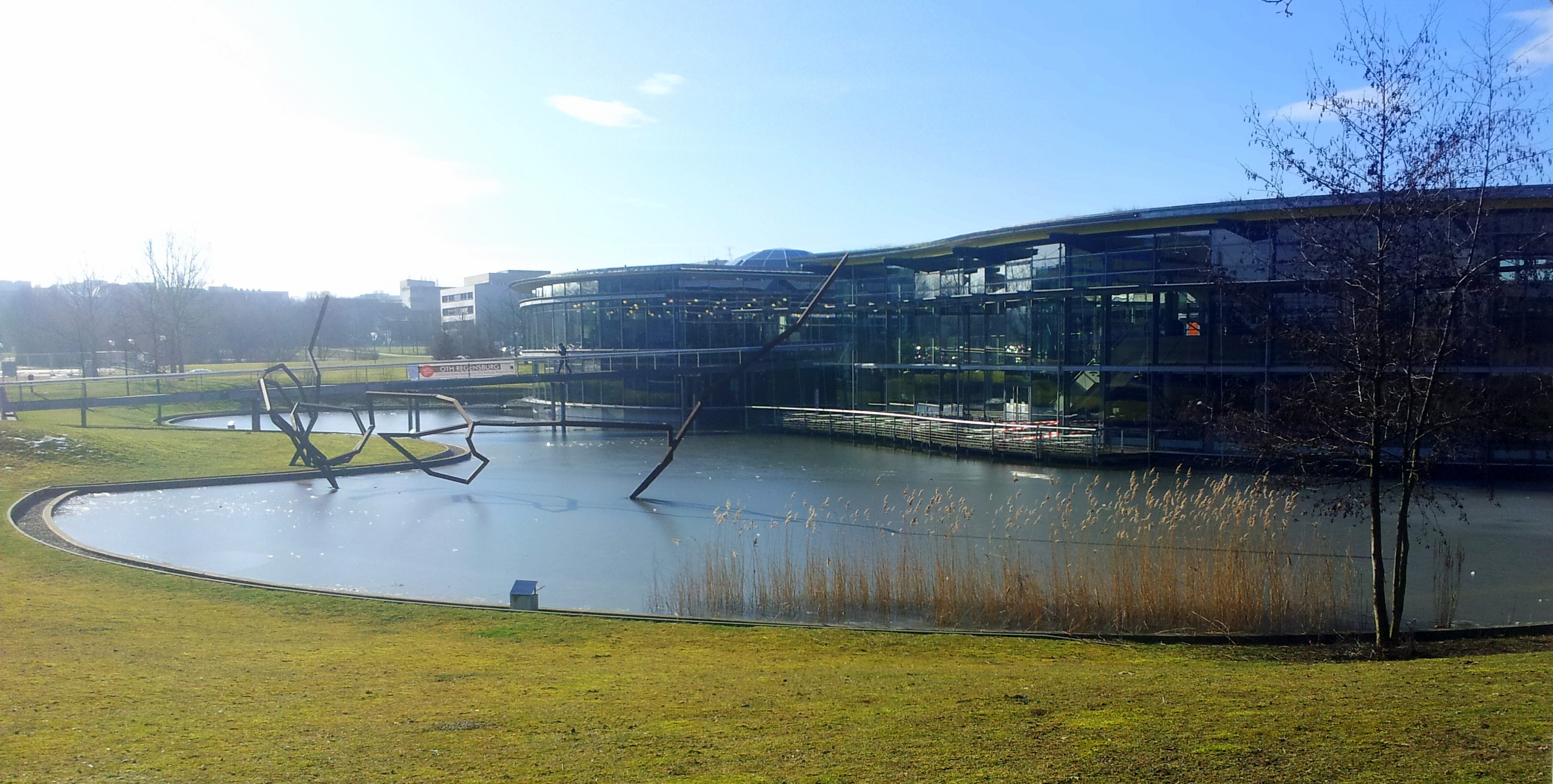
Regensburg University of Applied Sciences, campus

=== Universities and academia ===
Regensburg is known for its higher education institutions, the largest being the University of Regensburg. Founded in 1962, it is one of Germany's newest universities and ranks among the Top 400 worldwide. Among the prominent intellectuals associated with the university are Pope Benedict XVI, Udo Steiner, and Wolfgang Wiegard. The campus is located in a single location alongside Regensburg University of Applied Sciences.

Since 1874, there has been a College of Catholic Music in the city, the Hochschule für Katholische Kirchenmusik und Musikpädagogik Regensburg.

=== Research ===
In addition to the research centres and institutes of the universities, there are several research institutions situated in the city of Regensburg. Among them are the Leibniz-Institute for East and Southeast European Studies (IOS), the Regensburg Centre for Interventional Immunology (RCI), the Fraunhofer Institute for Toxicology and Experimental Medicine (ITEM), and the BioPark, the Bavarian biotech cluster.

=== Schools ===
There are eighteen elementary schools in Regensburg. The city also has several secondary education institutions, both public and private, representing all levels of the German school system. There are eight Gymnasien, five Realschulen, six Hauptschulen and four vocational schools (Berufsschulen). In addition, there are several folk high schools with different specialisations.

The SIS Swiss International School provides international education. Founded in 2002, the Sportinternat Regensburg was Europe's first baseball boarding school.

== Sports ==
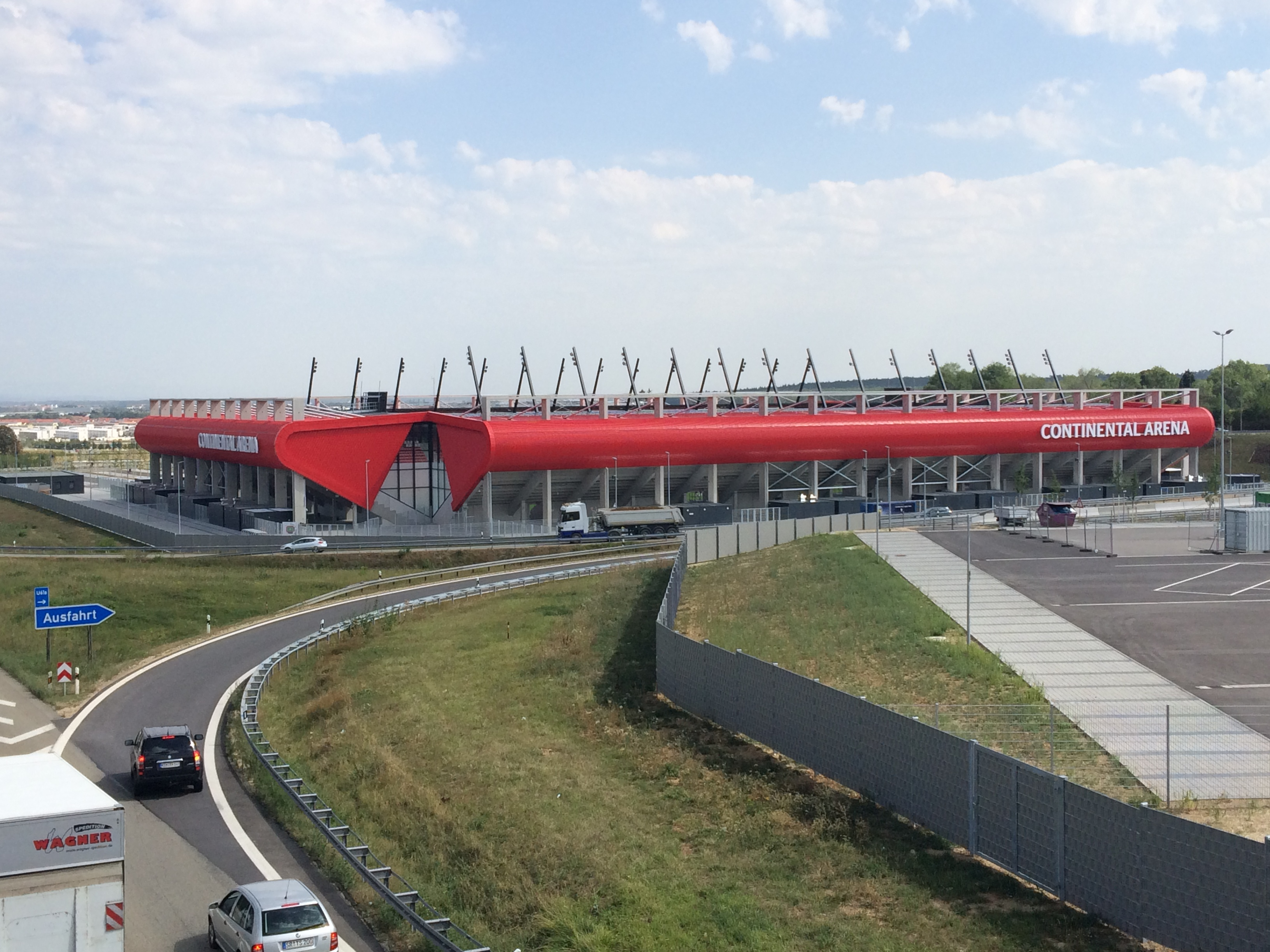
Arena Regensburg football stadium

=== Football ===
SSV Jahn Regensburg is the local football club and attracts a fairly large local following. The team was part of a larger sports club founded in 1889 as Turnerbund Jahn Regensburg, which took its name from Friedrich Ludwig Jahn, whose ideas of gymnastics greatly influenced German sport in the 19th century. The football department was created in 1907. The footballers and swimmers left their parent club in 1924 to form the Sportbund Jahn Regensburg.

=== Ice hockey ===
EV Regensburg is the local ice hockey club, currently playing in the DEL2, Germany's second highest professional league.

=== Baseball ===
Regensburg Legionäre is the baseball and softball club from Regensburg. The team is also known as Buchbinder Legionäre, following a sponsorship of the Buchbinder company. The club plays in the German Bundesliga and is one of the most famous and most successful baseball clubs in Germany. Several players now in the MLB formerly played at the club. Its arena, Armin-Wolf-Arena, was built in 1996 and has a capacity of 10,000 spectators, making it Germany's largest baseball stadium.

=== Athletics ===
The local athletics club, LG TELIS FINANZ Regensburg, offers a wide range of different competitions and is counted among the most successful clubs in Germany.

== Notable people ==
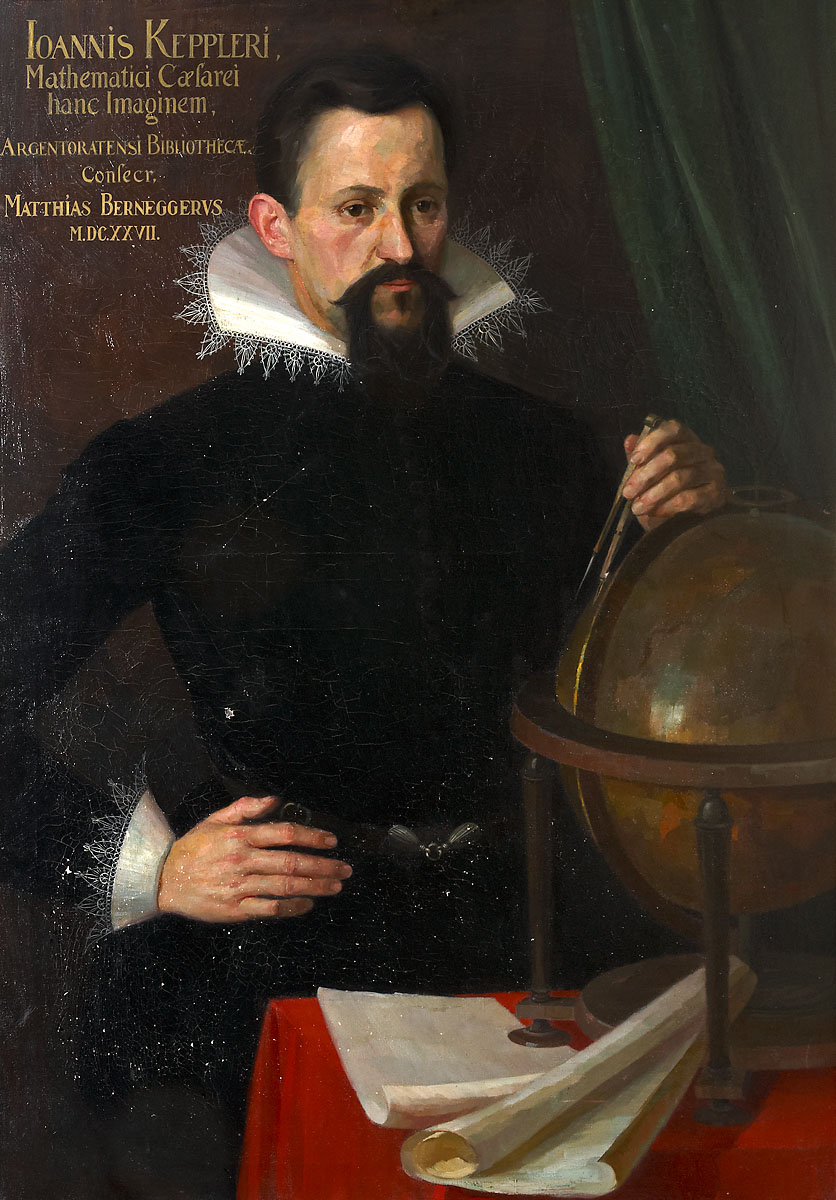
Johannes Kepler (1610)

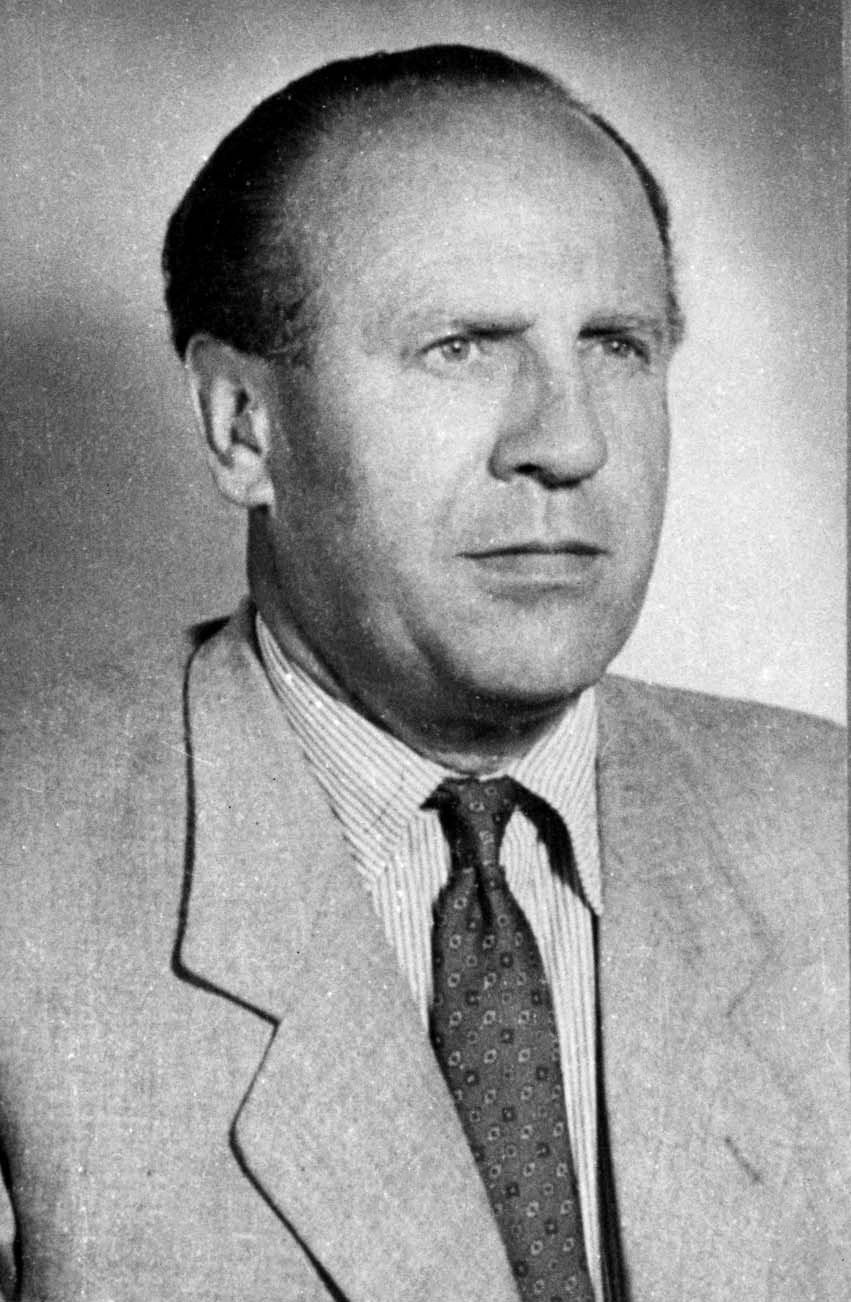
Oskar Schindler, post 1945

- Saint Emmeram (died 652), Christian bishop and a martyr, St. Emmeram's Abbey
- Wolfgang of Regensburg (ca.934–994), Bishop of Regensburg
- Ulrich of Zell (ca.1029–1093), Cluniac reformer of Germany, abbot, founder and saint
- Petachiah of Ratisbon, a 12th–13th century rabbi, best known for his extensive travels throughout Eastern Europe, the Caucasus, and the Middle East
- Judah ben Samuel of Regensburg, a 12th–13th century rabbi and mystic, founder of Chassidei Ashkenaz
- Albertus Magnus (ca.1206–1280), scholastic philosopher and polymath.
- Konrad of Megenberg (1309–1374), scholar and academic
- Albrecht Altdorfer (ca.1480–1538), printmaker, painter of landscapes, historical and Biblical subjects.
- Ulrich Schmidl (1510–1579 in Regensburg), supposed co-founder of Buenos Aires
- John of Austria (1547–1578), the illegitimate son of Charles V, Holy Roman Emperor.
- Johannes Kepler (1571–1630), mathematician and astronomer.
- Princely House of Thurn und Taxis (1608–1806), a German noble family and one of Europe's largest landowners
- Johann Georg Gichtel (1638–1710), was a German mystic and religious leader, critic of Lutheranism
- Georg Siegmund Facius (1750–1813) was a painter and cartographer.
- Emanuel Schikaneder (1751–1812), impresario, actor, singer, composer, and librettist of The Magic Flute
- Charles von Hügel (1795–1870), Austrian army officer, diplomat, botanist, and explorer.
- Elise Barensfeld (1796–after 1820), soprano
- Joseph Hanisch (1812–1892), musician, composer, and organist
- The Rev. Dr. Franz Xaver Haberl (1840–1910), Roman Catholic musician, teacher of Lorenzo Perosi
- Maximilian Oberst (1849–1925), physician and surgeon
- Johann Baptist Fuchs (1877–1938), military officer, senior police official, and SA general
- Anton Vilsmeier (1894–1962), German chemist best known for the Vilsmeier-Haack reaction, born in Burgweinting, which is now part of Regensburg, and attended the Altes Gymnasium in Regensburg
- Ludwig Bemelmans (1898–1962), an Austro-Hungarian-born American writer of children's books and internationally renowned gourmet, spent his early life in Regensburg
- Oskar Schindler (1908–1974), German industrialist and humanitarian, emigrated to Argentina after WW2
- Anton Hackl (1915–1984), Luftwaffe Flying Ace
- Pope Benedict XVI (1927–2022), professor of theology at the University of Regensburg from 1969 to 1977, who retained the title of honorary professor; made an honorary citizen in 2006
- Walter Röhrl (born 1947), racing driver
- Gerhard Ludwig Müller, Bishop of Regensburg 2002–2012, Cardinal Prefect of the Congregation of the Doctrine of the Faith, 2012–2017.
- Allan Zeman (born 1949), Hong Kong businessman
- Andrea Maria Schenkel (born 1962), best-selling author of Tannöd and other works
- Ulrich Eberl (born 1962), science and technology journalist
- Christian Jagodzinski (born ca.1965), multimillionaire, entrepreneur, and investor; Co-founder of Telebuch.de which became Amazon.com's presence in Germany; grew up in Regensburg, lives in Miami
- Princess Astrid of Liechtenstein (born 1968), German art collector, businesswoman, and interior designer
- Hisham Zreiq (born 1968), award-winning Palestinian Christian Independent filmmaker, poet, and visual artist
- Willie Duncan (born 1955), guitarist in Spider Murphy Gang (since 1983)
- Elisabeth Elli Erl (born 1979), winner of German Pop Idol 2004 – singer and teacher
- Benjamin Appl (born 1982), German-British lyric baritone
- Simone Laudehr (born 1986), German national team footballer, women's World Cup champion 2007
- Kenan Yıldız (born 2005), Turkish national footballer, the youngest-ever goalscorer for Juventus in the Champions League
- Can Uzun (born 2005), Turkish national footballer

== Gallery ==
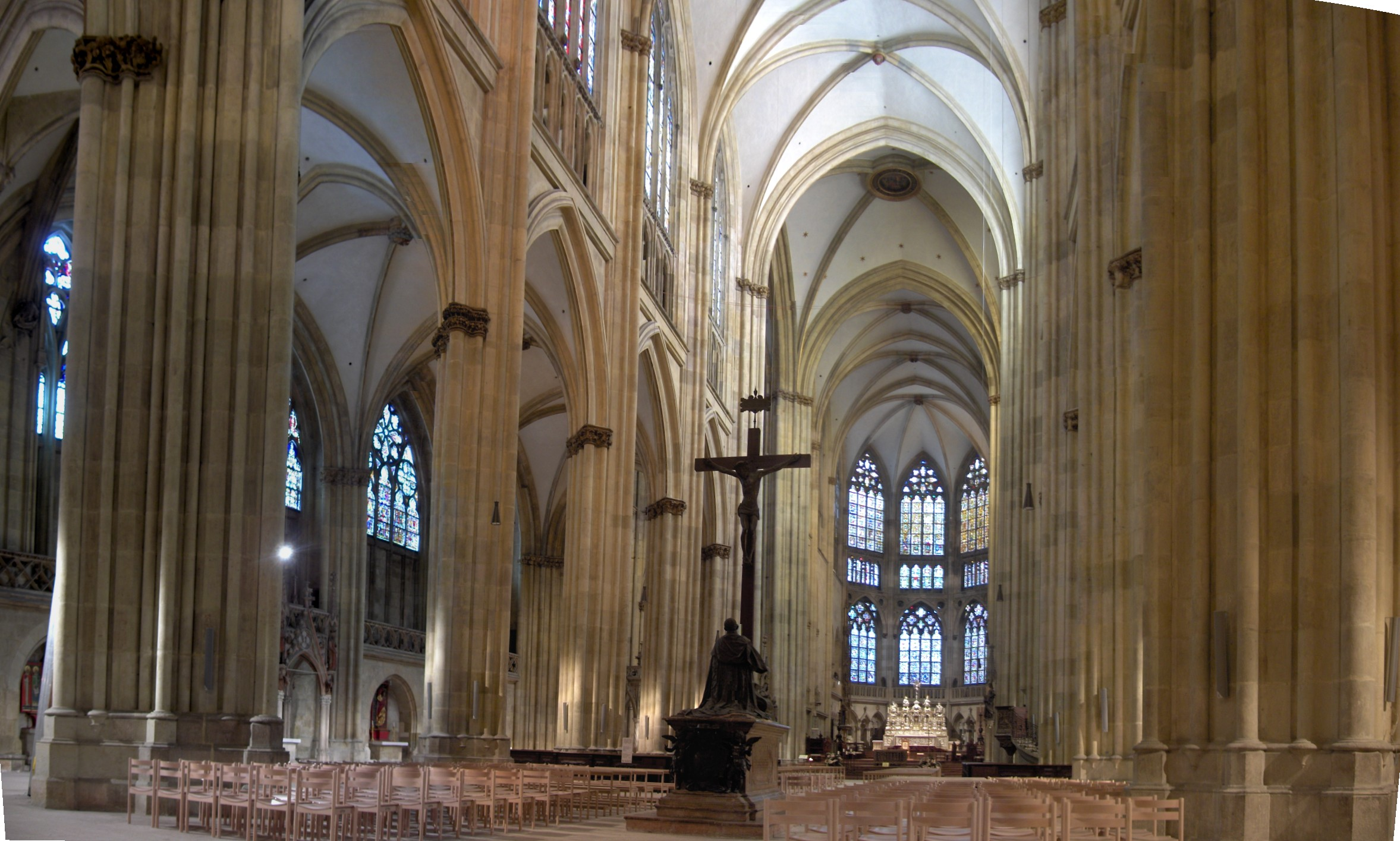
The Interior of Regensburg Cathedral

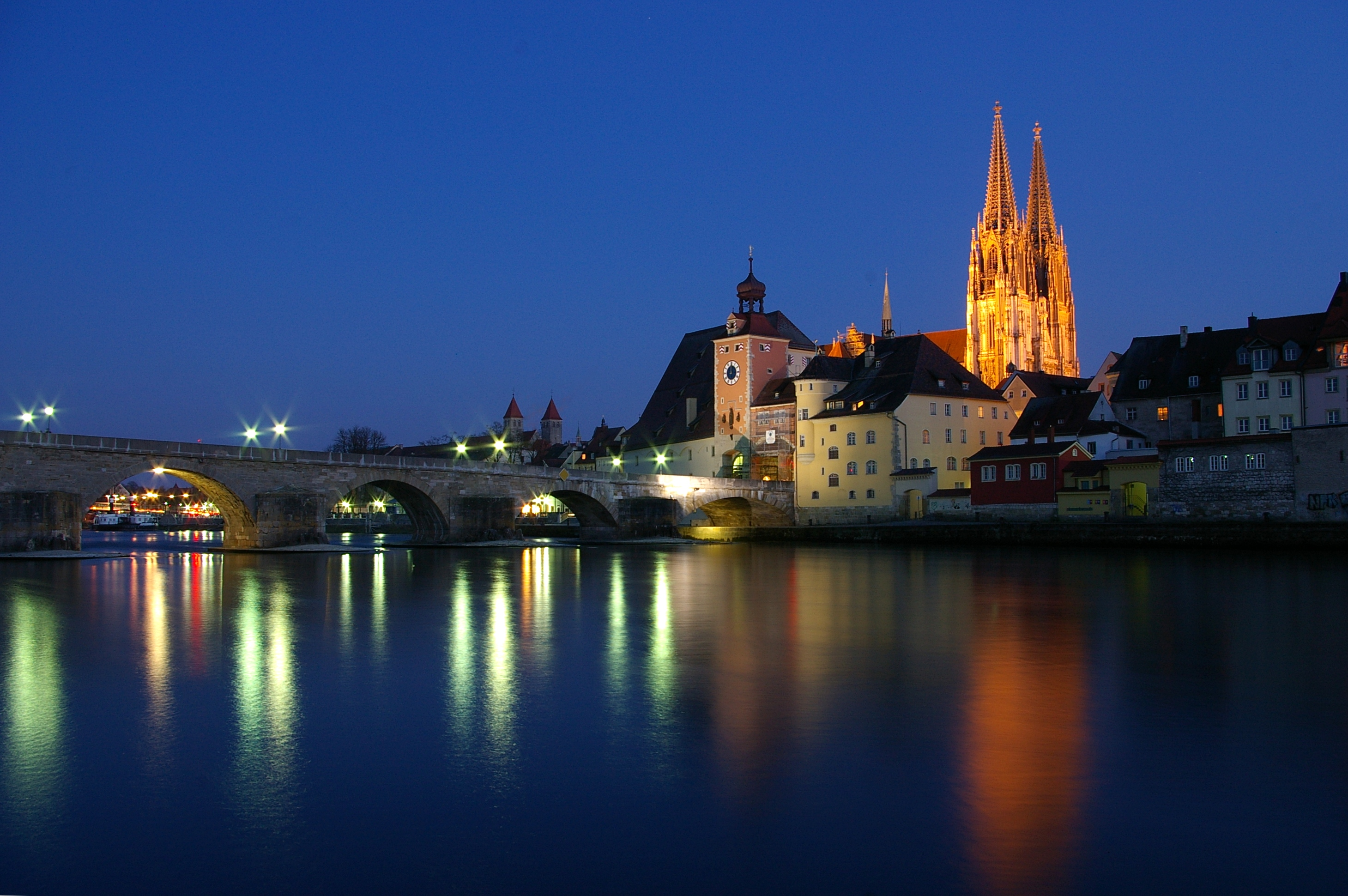
The Stone Bridge and Regensburg Cathedral by night

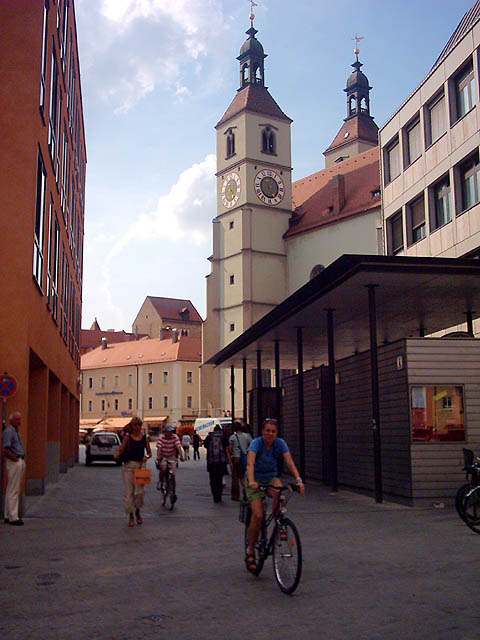
New Parish Church (Neupfarrkirche)

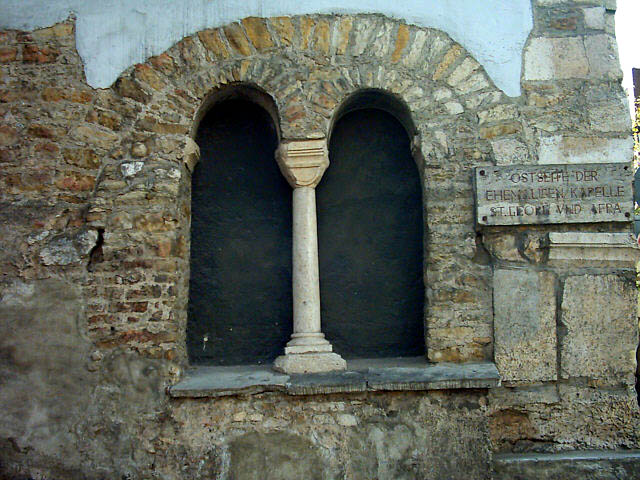
The Romanesque chapel St. George and Afra

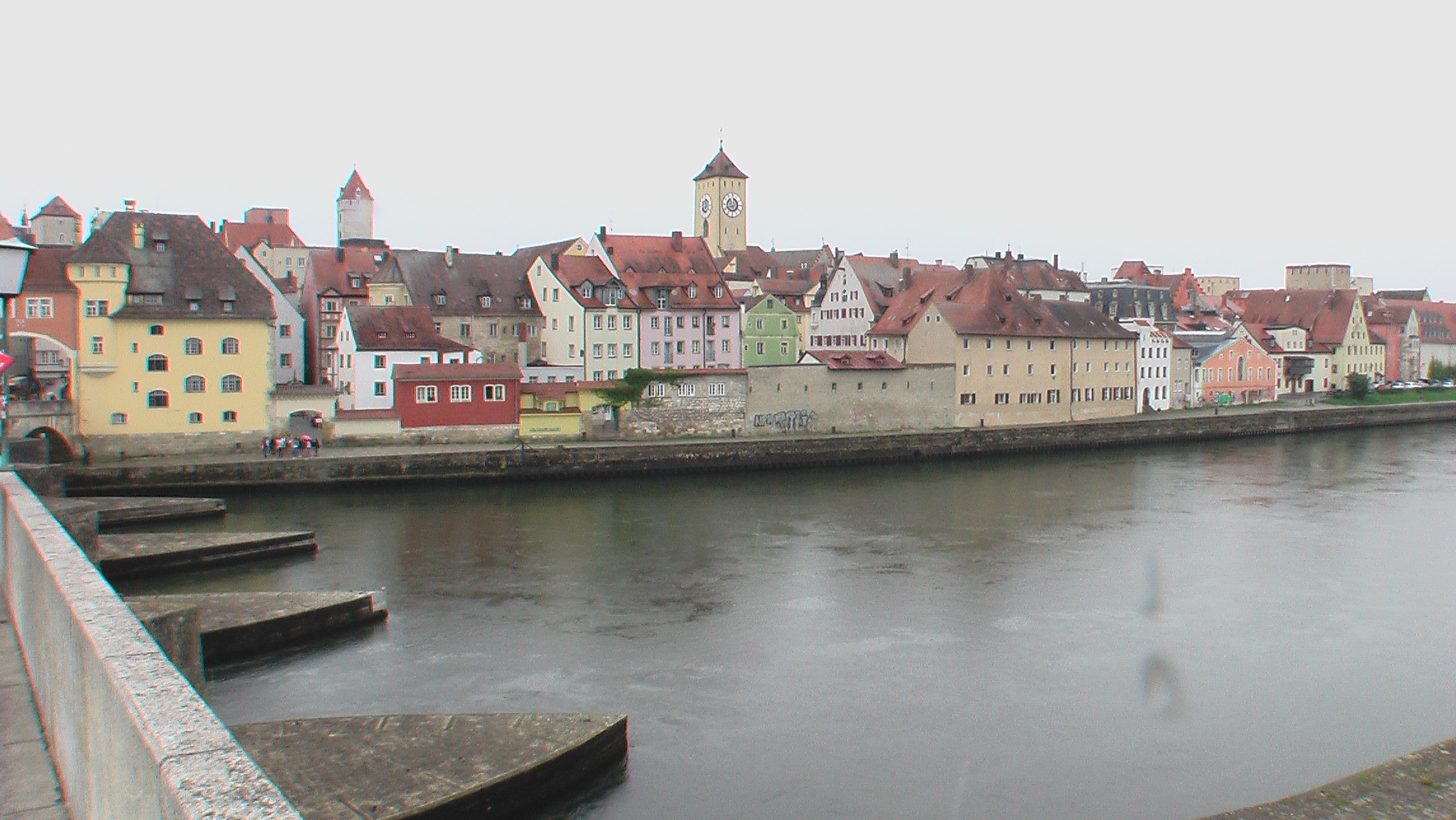
The Danube seen from the Stone Bridge

The bay window of the Old Town Hall

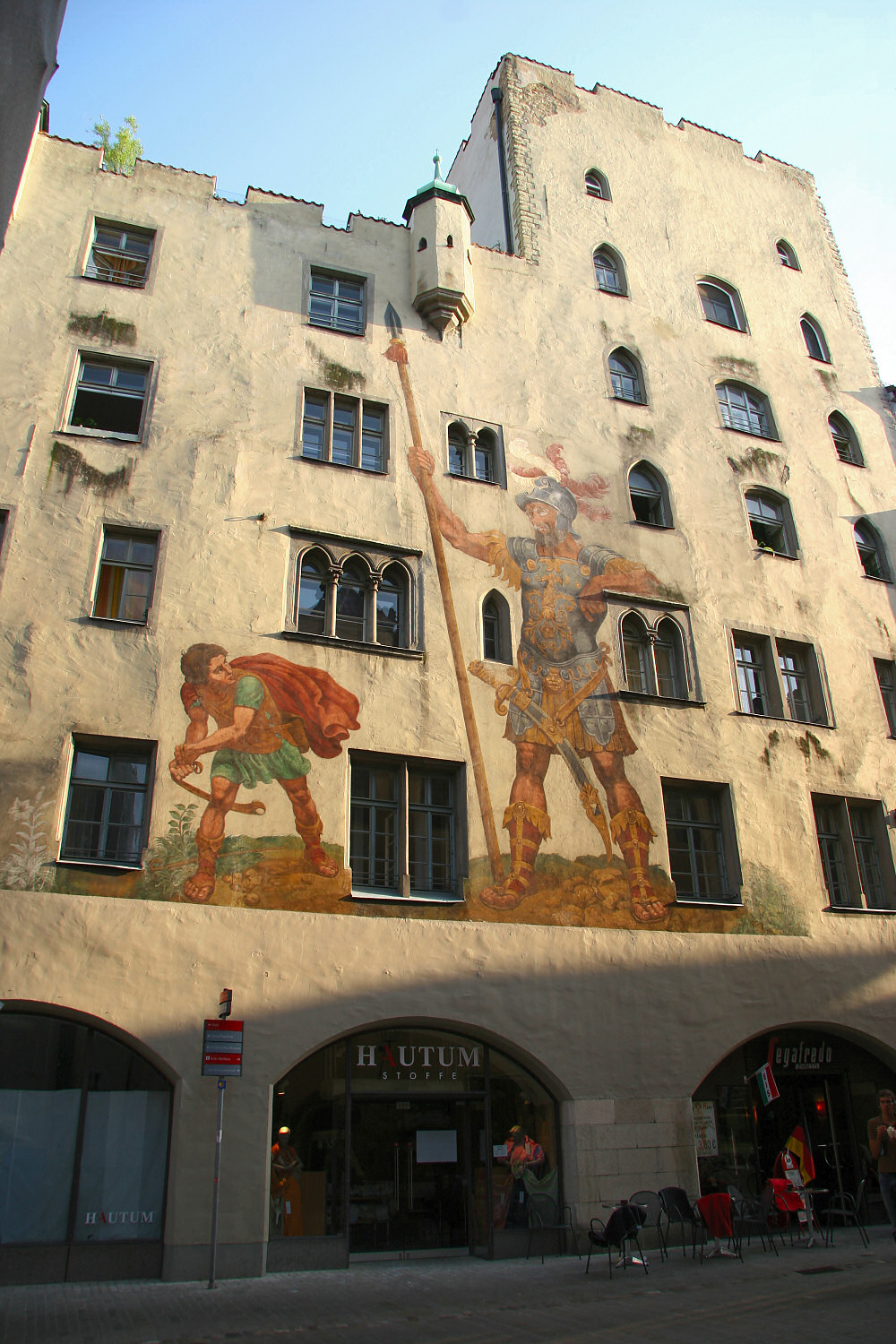
Goliath House

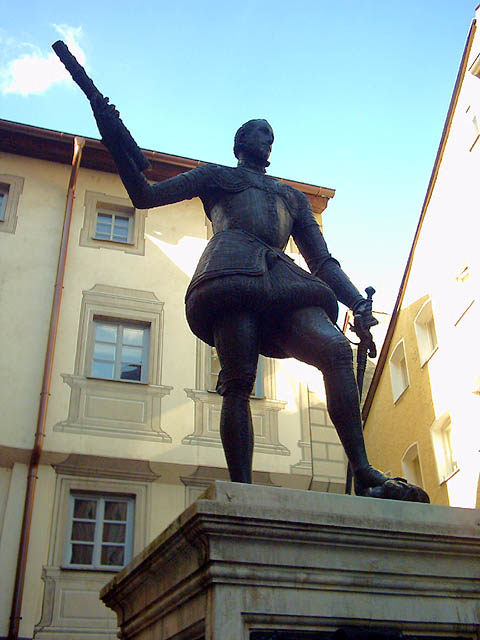
Monument of Don Juan de Austria

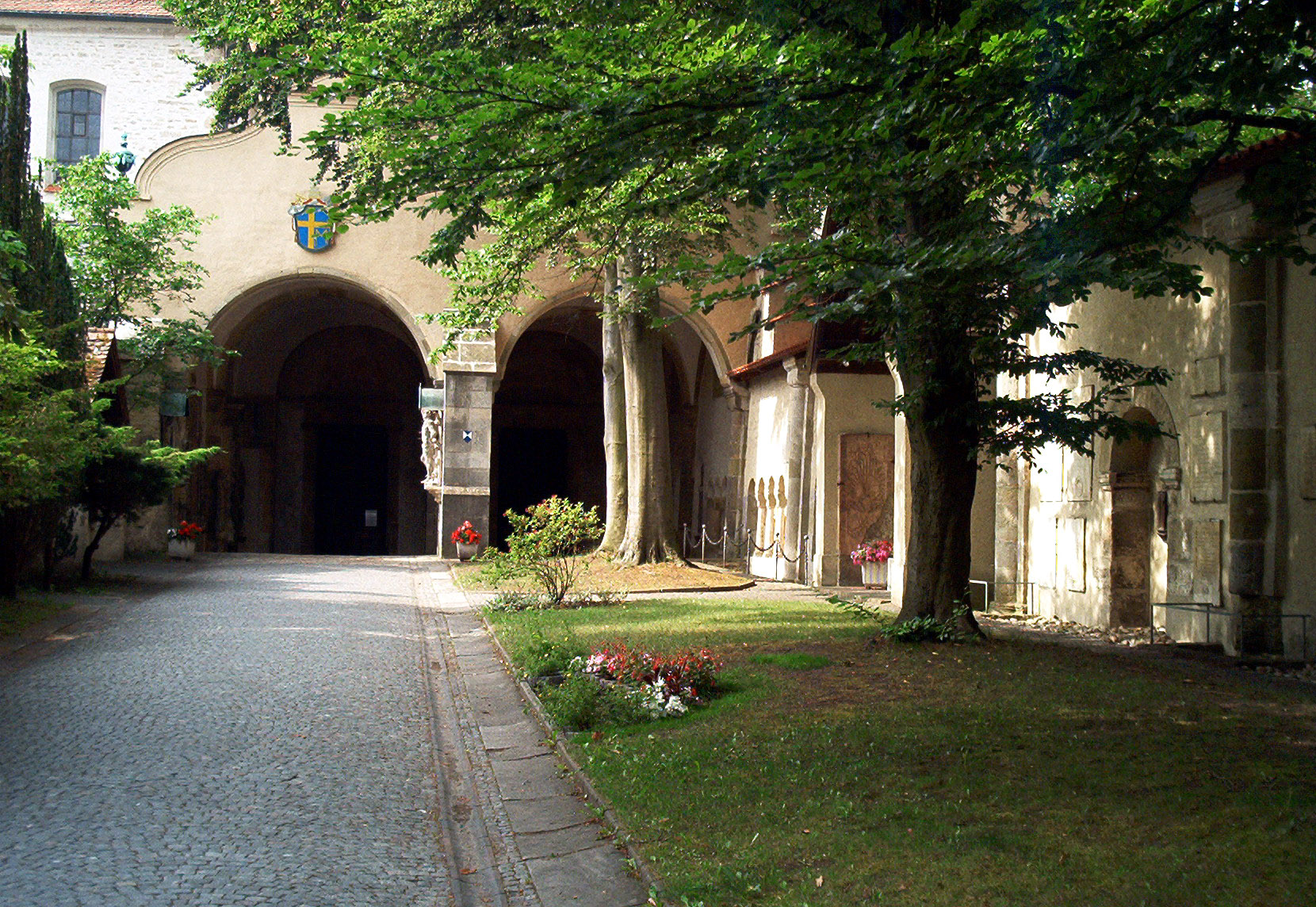
St. Emmeram's Abbey

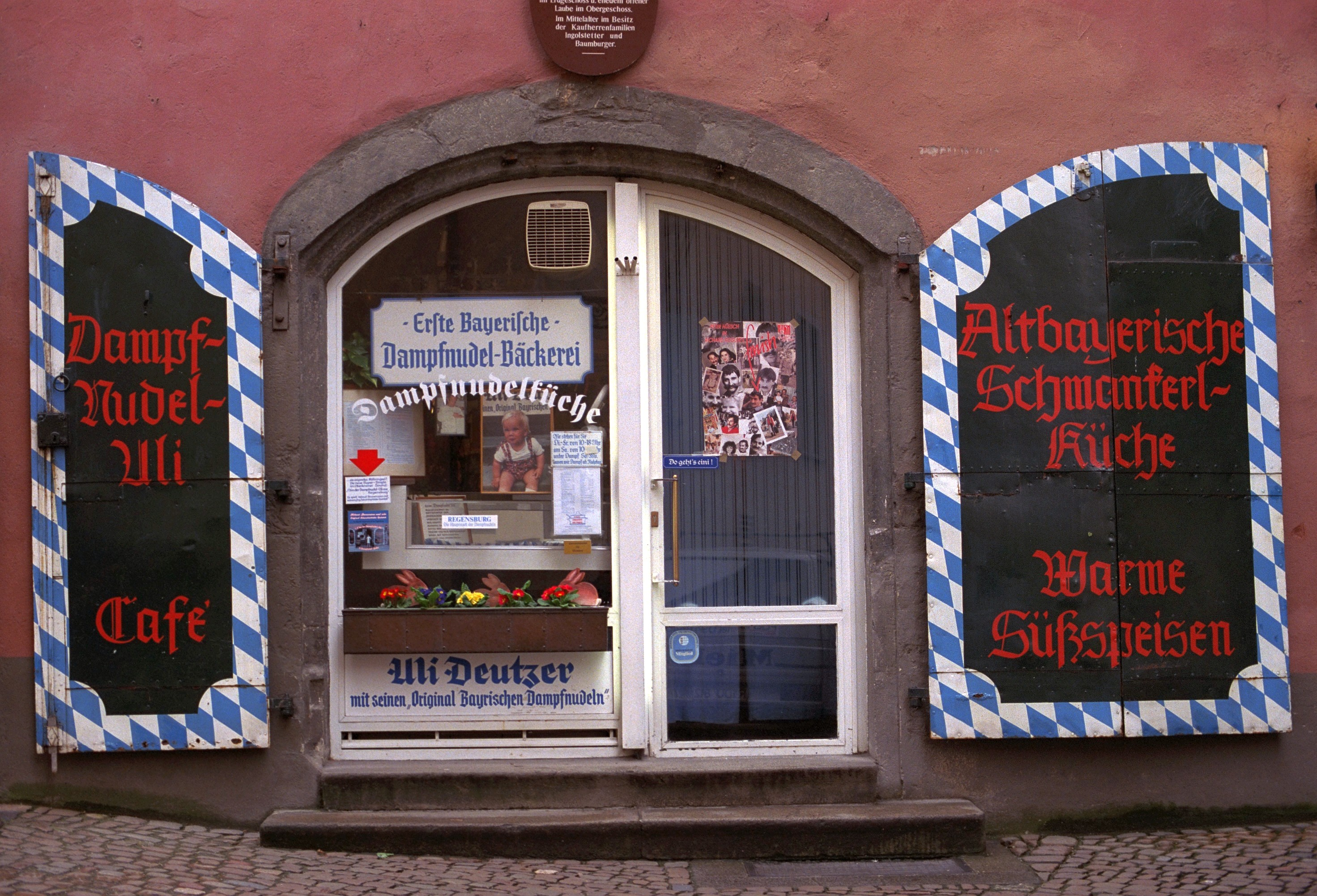
Dampfnudel bakery in the Baumburger Turm

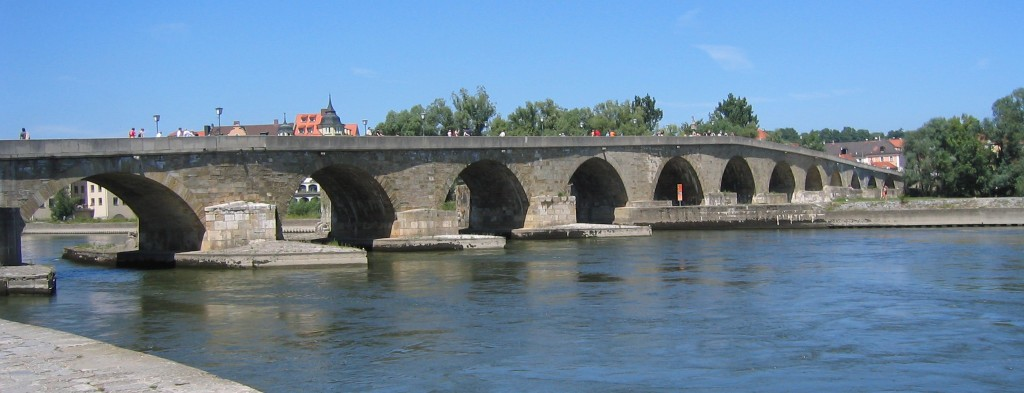
The Stone Bridge

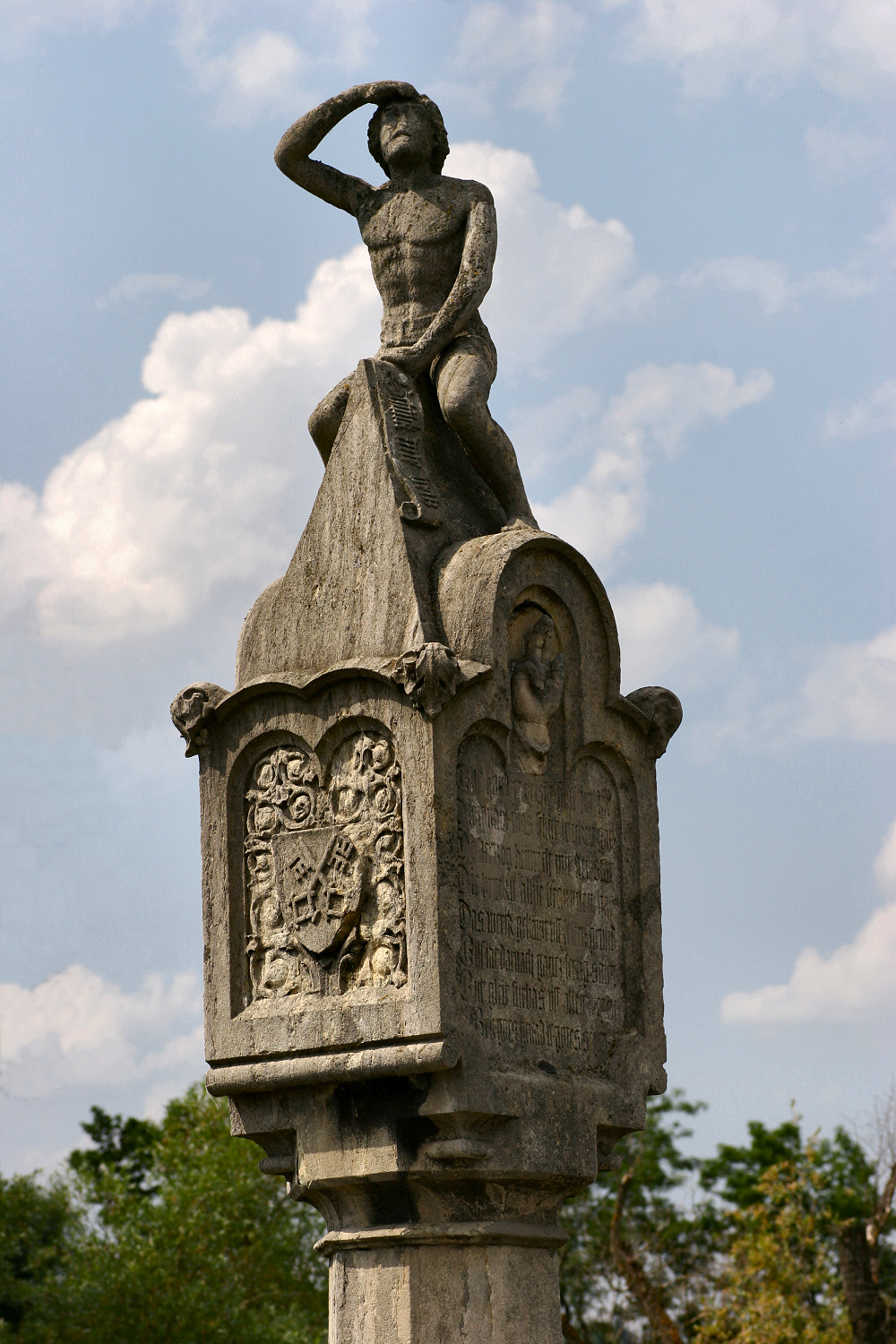
Little Boy (Bruckmandl) on the Stone Bridge

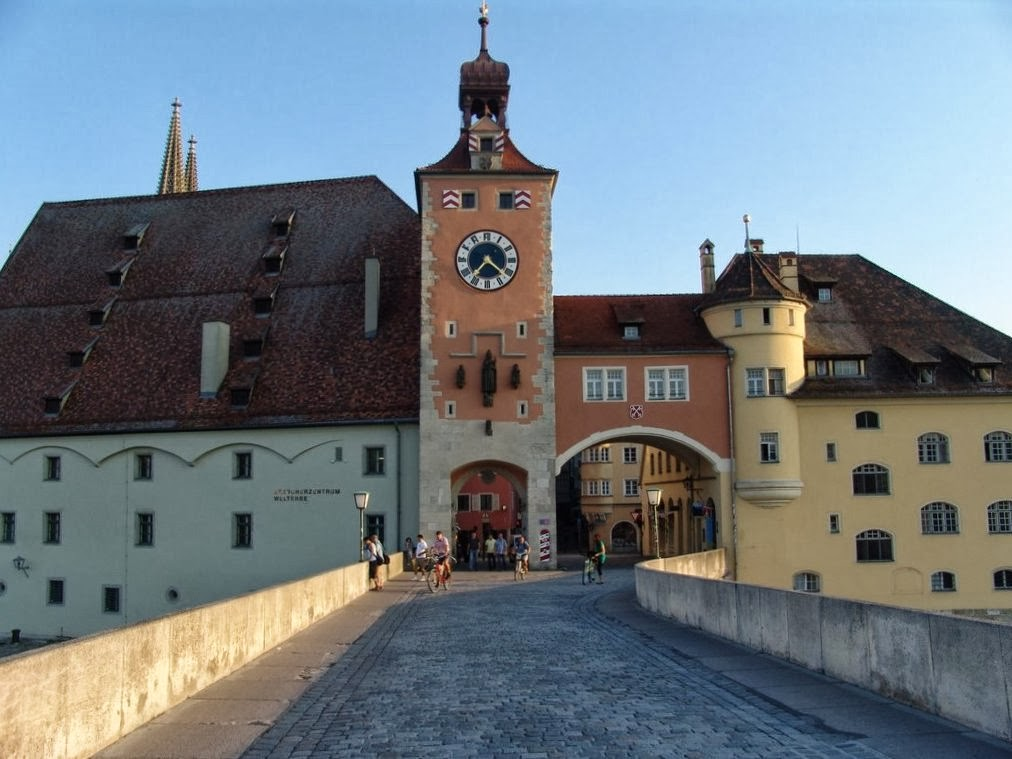
Old city gate

== See also ==
- History of the Jews in Regensburg
- List of mayors of Regensburg
- List of the prince-bishops and bishops of Regensburg
- List of cities and towns on the river Danube
- Regensburg (district)

== Sources ==
- David L. Sheffler, Schools and Schooling in Late Medieval Germany: Regensburg, 1250–1500 (Leiden, Brill, 2008) (Education and Society in the Middle Ages and Renaissance, 33).
