= List of restaurants in Germany =

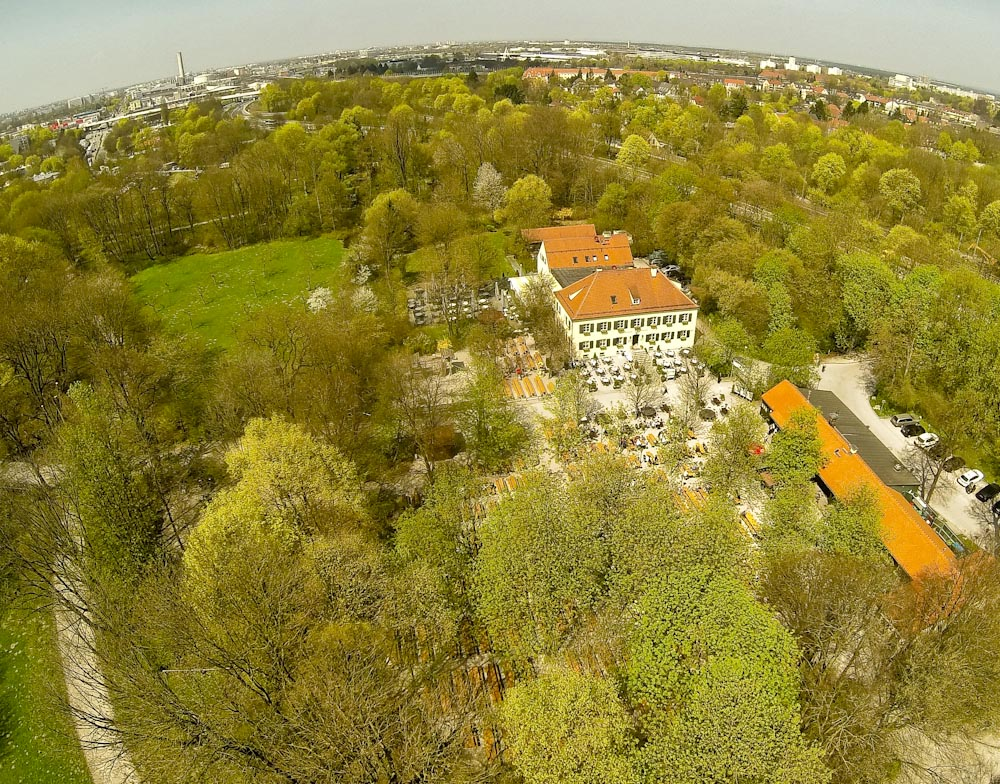
Aumeister in Munich

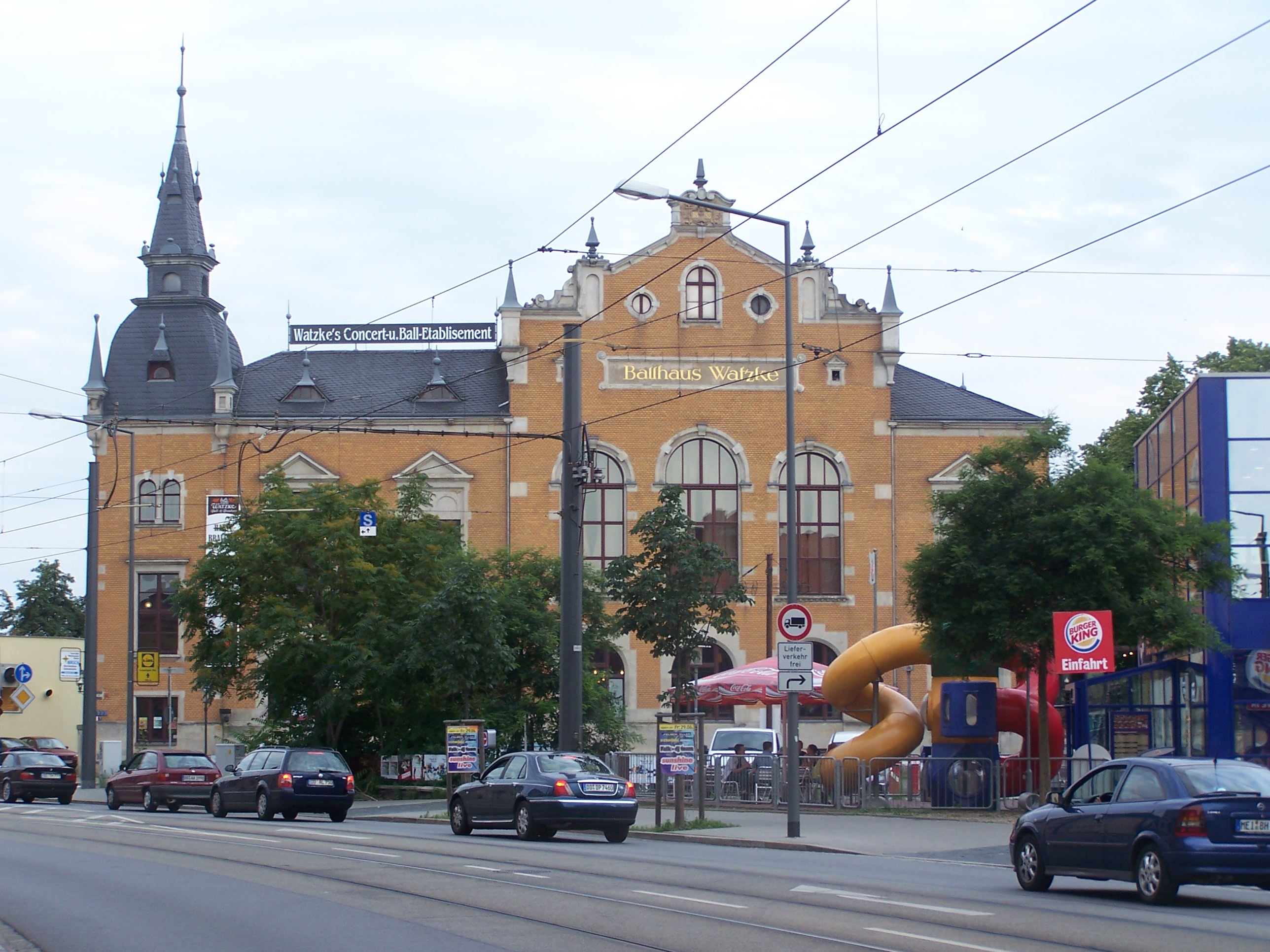
The Ballhaus Watzke in Dresden

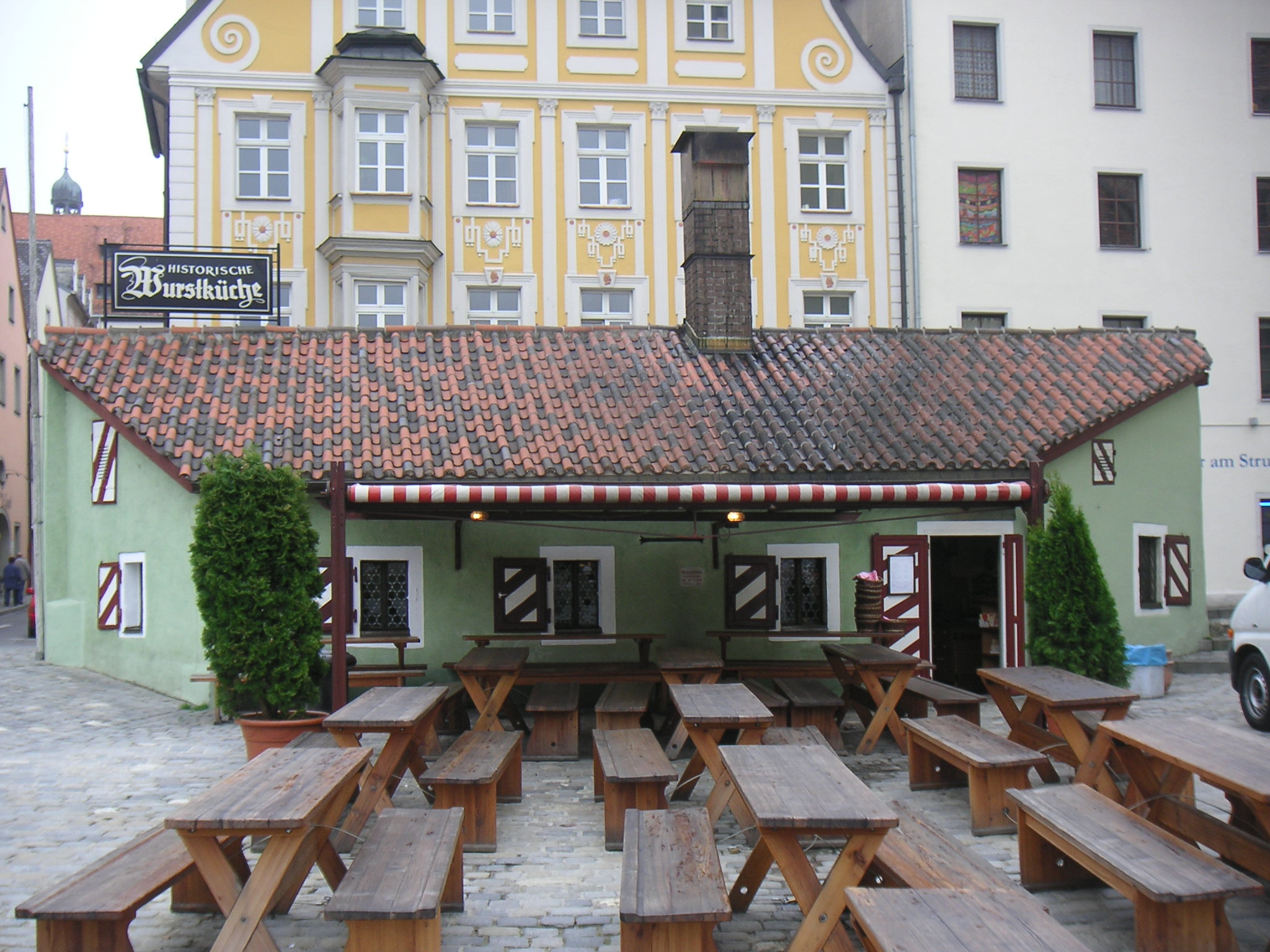
Regensburg Sausage Kitchen in Regensburg

This is a list of notable restaurants in Germany.

== Restaurants in Germany ==
=== Bergisch Gladbach ===
- Vendôme

=== Dresden ===
- Ballhaus Watzke

=== Munich ===
- Aumeister
- Hirschgarten
- Tantris

=== Nuremberg ===
- Bratwurst-Röslein
- Bratwursthäusle Nürnberg

=== Elsewhere ===
- Alte Taverne ― traditional restaurant in Bad Füssing, Bavaria.
- Andechs ― monastery restaurant in Andechs Abbey, Bavaria, Germany.
- Regensburg Sausage Kitchen ― restaurant in Regensburg, Germany.

=== Former restaurants ===
- Großgaststätte Ahornblatt
- Horcher ― Popular restaurant in Nazi Germany. Originally opened in Berlin, Germany, in 1904. Moved to Madrid, Spain, in 1943.

== See also ==
- German cuisine
- List of companies of Germany
- List of Michelin-starred restaurants in Germany
- Lists of restaurants
