= List of Michelin-starred restaurants in Berlin =

As of the 2024 guide, there are 20 restaurants in Berlin with a Michelin-star rating, a rating system used by the Michelin Guide to grade restaurants based on their quality.

The Michelin Guides have been published by the French tire company Michelin since 1900. They were designed as a guide to tell drivers about eateries they recommended to visit and to subtly sponsor their tires, by encouraging drivers to use their cars more and therefore need to replace the tires as they wore out. Over time, the stars that were given out started to become more valuable.

Multiple anonymous Michelin inspectors visit the restaurants several times. They rate the restaurants on five criteria: "quality of products", "mastery of flavor and cooking techniques", "the personality of the chef represented in the dining experience", "value for money", and "consistency between inspectors' visits". Inspectors have at least ten years of expertise and create a list of popular restaurants supported by media reports, reviews, and diner popularity. If they reach a consensus, Michelin awards restaurants from one to three stars based on its evaluation methodology: One star means "high-quality cooking, worth a stop", two stars signify "excellent cooking, worth a detour", and three stars denote "exceptional cuisine, worth a special journey". The stars are not permanent and restaurants are constantly being re-evaluated. If the criteria are not met, the restaurant will lose its stars.

The Michelin Guide first launched in Germany in 1910.

== Lists ==
Key
1 Michelin star	One Michelin star
2 Michelin stars	Two Michelin stars
3 Michelin stars	Three Michelin stars
—	The restaurant did not receive a star that year
Closed	The restaurant is no longer open

Michelin-starred restaurants
Name	Cuisine	Borough	2022	2023	2024
Bandol sur mer	Creative	Mitte	1 Michelin star	1 Michelin star	1 Michelin star
Bieberbau	Modern	Charlottenburg-Wilmersdorf	1 Michelin star	1 Michelin star	1 Michelin star
Bonvivant	Vegetarian	Tempelhof-Schöneberg	—	1 Michelin star	1 Michelin star
Bricole	French	Pankow	1 Michelin star	1 Michelin star	1 Michelin star
CODA Dessert Dining	Dessert	Neukölln	2 Michelin stars	2 Michelin stars	2 Michelin stars
Cookies Cream	Vegetarian	Mitte	1 Michelin star	1 Michelin star	1 Michelin star
Cordo	German	Mitte	1 Michelin star	1 Michelin star	Closed
Einsunternull	German	Mitte	1 Michelin star	Closed	
Ernst	Japanese	Mitte	1 Michelin star	1 Michelin star	Closed
FACIL	Contemporary	Mitte	2 Michelin stars	2 Michelin stars	2 Michelin stars
faelt	Contemporary	Tempelhof-Schöneberg	1 Michelin star	1 Michelin star	1 Michelin star
Frühsammers	Modern	Charlottenburg-Wilmersdorf	1 Michelin star	Closed	
GOLVET	Creative	Mitte	1 Michelin star	1 Michelin star	1 Michelin star
hallmann & klee	Modern	Neukölln	—	—	1 Michelin star
Horváth	Creative	Friedrichshain-Kreuzberg	2 Michelin stars	2 Michelin stars	2 Michelin stars
Hugos	Modern	Mitte	1 Michelin star	1 Michelin star	1 Michelin star
Irma la Douce	French	Mitte	1 Michelin star	1 Michelin star	1 Michelin star
Kin Dee	Thai	Mitte	1 Michelin star	—	—
Lorenz Adlon Esszimmer	Creative	Mitte	2 Michelin stars	2 Michelin stars	2 Michelin stars
Nobelhart & Schmutzig	German	Friedrichshain-Kreuzberg	1 Michelin star	1 Michelin star	1 Michelin star
prism	Israeli	Charlottenburg-Wilmersdorf	1 Michelin star	1 Michelin star	1 Michelin star
Richard	French	Friedrichshain-Kreuzberg	1 Michelin star	1 Michelin star	Closed
Rutz	Modern	Mitte	3 Michelin stars	3 Michelin stars	3 Michelin stars
SKYKITCHEN	Modern	Lichtenberg	1 Michelin star	1 Michelin star	1 Michelin star
The NOName	Modern	Mitte	—	1 Michelin star	Closed
Tim Raue	Pan-Asian	Friedrichshain-Kreuzberg	2 Michelin stars	2 Michelin stars	2 Michelin stars
tulus lotrek	Modern	Friedrichshain-Kreuzberg	1 Michelin star	1 Michelin star	1 Michelin star
Reference					

== See also ==
- List of Michelin-starred restaurants in Bavaria
- List of Michelin-starred restaurants in Eastern Germany
- List of Michelin-starred restaurants in Northern Germany
- List of restaurants in Germany
