= Stone Bridge (Regensburg) =

Bridge in Germany

Stone Bridge Steinerne Brücke
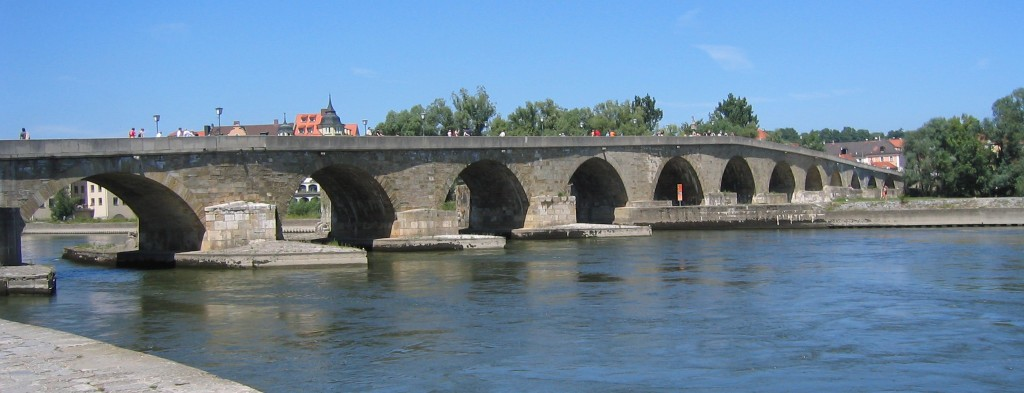
- The bridge seen from the south bank of the Danube
- Coordinates: 49°1′22″N 12°5′50″E
- Carries: Road (closed to traffic)
- Crosses: Danube

Characteristics
- Material: Stone
- Total length: 308.7 metres (1,013 ft)
- No. of spans: 16

History
- Construction end: 12th-century, probably in 1135–46
- Replaces: Wooden bridge

Location
- Interactive map of Stone Bridge

The Stone Bridge (Steinerne Brücke) in Regensburg, Germany, is a 12th-century bridge across the Danube linking the Old Town with Stadtamhof. For more than 800 years, until the 1930s, it remained the city's only bridge across the river. It is a masterwork of medieval construction and an emblem of the city.

== Location ==
The south end of the bridge may have been the location of an ancient city gate. The early 16th-century Amberg Salt Store (German: Salzstadel) and the early 17th-century Regensburg Salt Store were built against it. The Regensburg Sausage Kitchen east of the Salt Store was built against the city wall in the 14th century; an earlier building on the same site probably served as a canteen for the workers building the bridge. Further east is the Regensburg Museum of Danube Shipping.

The bridge has historically caused problems for traffic on the Danube, as was observed by Napoleon in 1809. It causes strong currents which required upstream shipping with insufficient power to be towed past it until 1916, when an electric system was installed to draw ships under the bridge. This was removed in 1964. Since modern barge traffic requires more clearance than the arches of the bridge provide, this stretch of the river is now only used by recreational and excursion shipping. Larger watercraft bypass it to the north by means of the Regensburg Regen-Danube Canal, which was built on the flood plain called the Protzenweiher which had been used for a cattle market and public amusements and forms part of the European Water Route between Rotterdam at the mouth of the Rhine and Constance on the Black Sea. (Demolition of the bridge to remove the obstruction was proposed as early as 1904.)

== History ==
Charlemagne had a wooden bridge built at Regensburg, approximately 100 metres (330 ft) east of the present bridge, but it was inadequate for the traffic and vulnerable to floods, so it was decided to replace it with a stone bridge.

The Stone Bridge was built in only eleven years, probably in 1135–46. Louis VII of France and his army used it to cross the Danube on their way to the Second Crusade. It served as a model for other stone bridges built in Europe in the 12th and 13th centuries: the Elbe bridge (now Augustus Bridge) in Dresden, London Bridge across the Thames, the Pont d'Avignon across the Rhône and the Judith Bridge (predecessor of the Charles Bridge) across the Vltava in Prague. It remained the only bridge across the Danube at Regensburg for about 800 years, until the construction of the Nibelungen Bridge. For centuries it was the only bridge over the river between Ulm and Vienna, making Regensburg a major centre of trade and government.

The bridge originally had its own administration, using a seal depicting it, the oldest example of which dates to 1307; tolls were used for its upkeep.

=== Construction and modifications ===
The Stone Bridge is an arch bridge with 16 arches. At the south end, the first arch and first pier were incorporated into the Regensburg Salt Store when it was built in 1616–20, but remain in place under the approach road to the bridge. An archaeological investigation was performed in 2009, and revealed fire damage during the Middle Ages. The bridge was originally 336 metres (1,102 ft) long; the building in of the first pier reduced it to 308.7 metres (1,013 ft). The southern, Old Town end of the bridge is half a metre lower than the northern, Stadtamhof end, and the bridge bends slightly because of the course of the river at that point.

Construction of the bridge was made easier by an unusually hot, dry summer in 1135, which caused very low water levels in the Danube. Some of the bridge piers are on the two islands in the Danube within the city, the Upper and Lower Wöhrd. The others rest on foundations of oak logs on the riverbed, which were constructed inside cofferdams of oak planking. To protect them from being undermined by the river, they are surrounded by pillar-shaped artificial islands or abutments; these were enlarged in 1687. The bridge abutments are a substantial impediment to the flow of water, with as little as 4 metres between them, creating strong whirling currents under the bridge and downstream, which are referred to as the "Regensburg Danube Strudel". Five of them were reduced in size in 1848 as part of construction of the Ludwig Canal, and they were all reduced and strengthened with concrete and stone during renovation work in 1951–62. The construction using abutments is a modification of the technique used by the Romans for the bridge over the Mosel at Trier, where the piers rest directly on the riverbed.

Watermills were built at the south end of the bridge, making use of the currents it created; the revenues contributed to the upkeep of the bridge. The Bavarians had them burnt in 1633 during the Thirty Years' War; some were rebuilt in 1655 but in 1784 an ice dam on the river destroyed them. One was rebuilt at the foot of the Salt Store for a few more years.

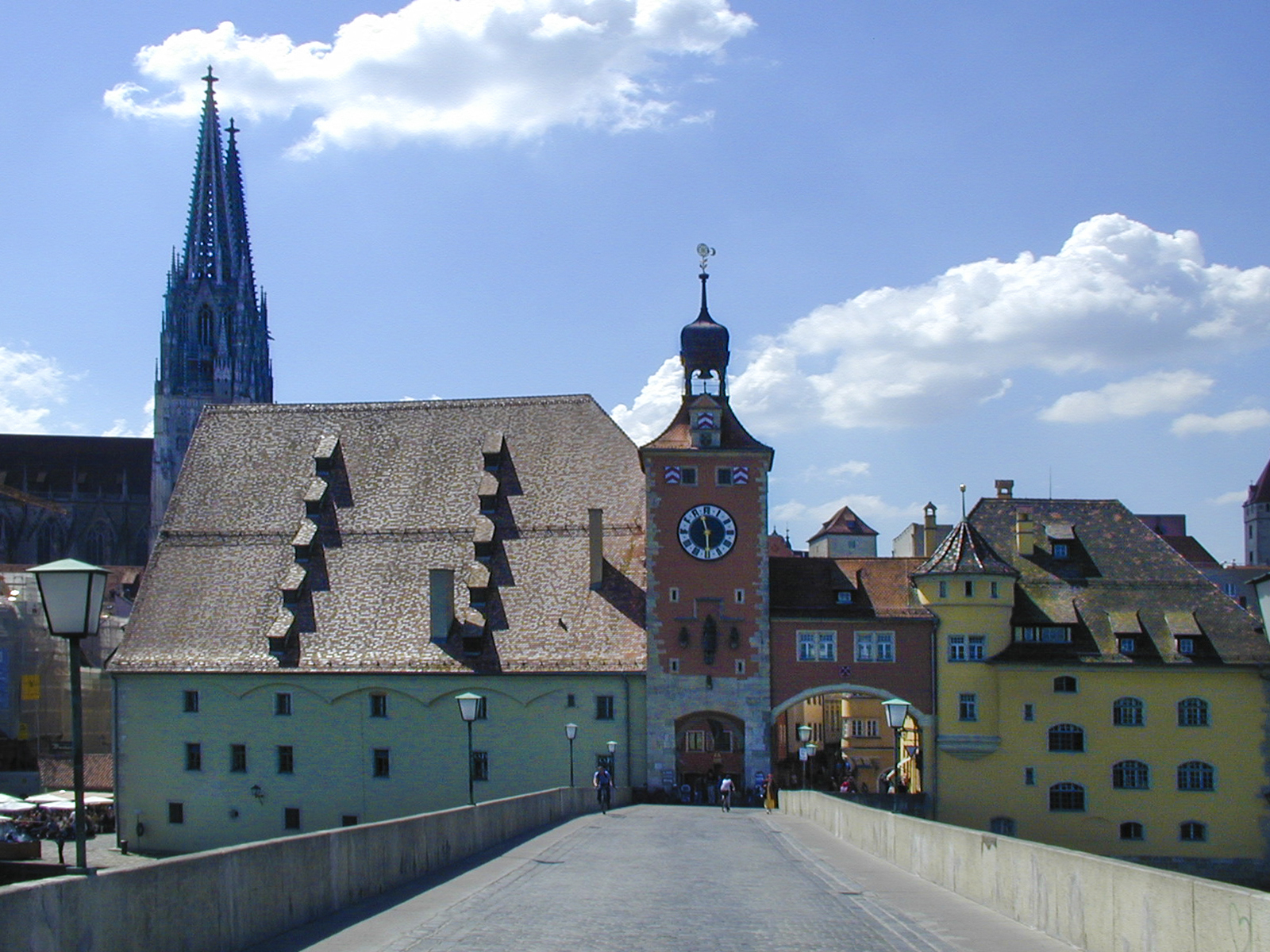
The remaining tower at the south end of the bridge, with tramway arch to the right, and Salt Store; Regensburg Cathedral in the background.

In the Thirty Years' War, during the Swedish attack on the city in 1633, the fourth bridge span (the third now visible) was blown up. The gap was filled by a wooden drawbridge and only repaired in 1790/91 after it became apparent that the missing section was weakening the bridge.

The bridge originally had three towers, of which only the south tower, a gate tower to the Old City, survives. The original south tower was built around 1300; beside it stood a chapel of St Margaret. In the mid-16th century this was converted into a debtors' prison and the tower became known as the Debt Tower (Schuldturm). The middle tower was built around 1200. Both the south and the middle towers were destroyed by fire in the Thirty Years' War, when the city was under occupation by the Swedes. They were rebuilt in 1648, the clock being added to the south tower at that time, but the middle tower was demolished in 1784 after being almost destroyed by the ice dam. The north tower (the Black Tower), was probably built in the second half of the 12th century, in association with the bridge itself. It was heavily fortified between 1383 and 1429, including a drawbridge. This tower was damaged in 1809 during the Napoleonic Wars when the French and Bavarians retook the city from the Austrians, and had to be demolished the next year. In 1824/25 the site where it had stood was widened to accommodate a bazaar.

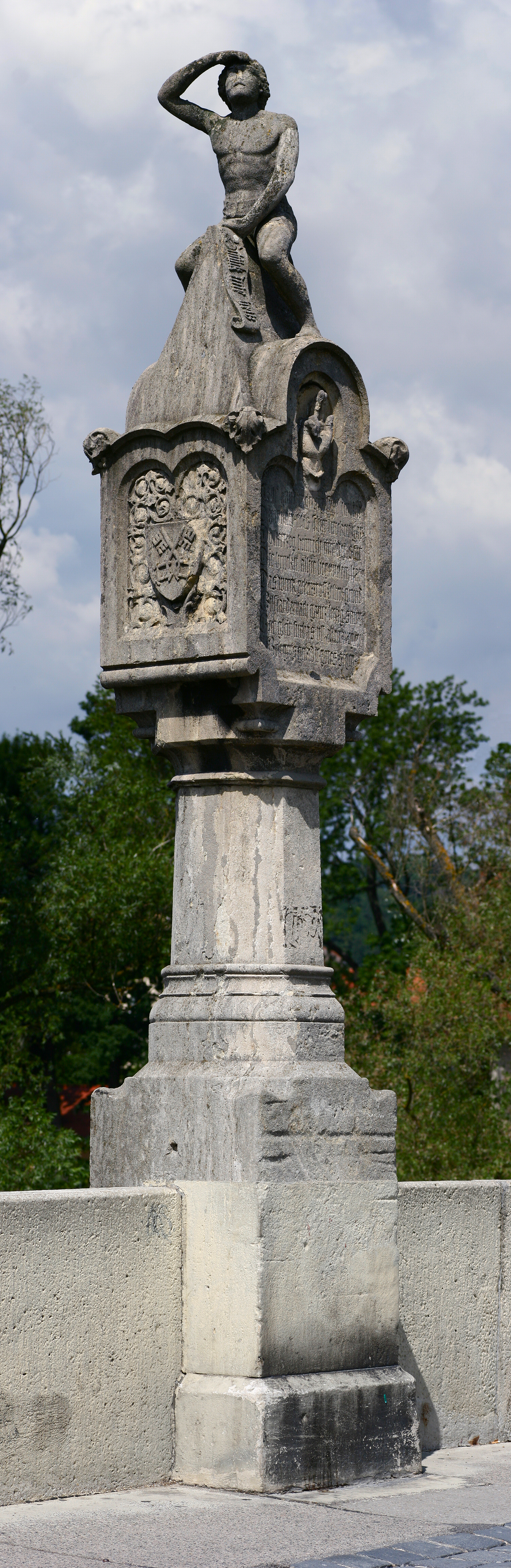
Bruckmandl at the highest point of the bridge

The chapel was removed and replaced by a tollhouse in 1829. In the early 20th century, when the tramway was built, all buildings between the remaining tower and the Amberg Salt Store were removed, widening the street approaching the bridge, and a wide arch was built over it beside the tower. Late in the Second World War, on 23 April 1945, German troops dynamited the second pier of the bridge immediately in front of that point, and also the eleventh, to slow the advance of American troops. The Americans installed temporary planking the following winter, but the damage was not fully repaired until 1967.

The bridge originally had thick stone balustrades, with very narrow pedestrian gangways beside them. The balustrades were replaced in 1732 with thinner slabs of sandstone, widening the roadway. In 1877 these were in turn replaced with granite from Flossenbürg, and the wooden ramp which had connected the bridge to the Upper Wöhrd since 1499 was replaced with an iron one at the same time. Finally, in 1950, the bridge was given concrete balustrades.

The north end of the bridge was formerly the border between the Duchy (later Electorate) of Bavaria and the Free Imperial City of Regensburg. At the highest point of the bridge is a stone carving called the Bruckmandl or Brückenmännchen (bridge mannikin), a largely naked young man shielding his eyes with one hand and with an inscription reading "Schuck wie heiß" (likely a reference to the hot summer when the bridge was begun). He has been said to symbolise the city's freedoms and its emancipation from the control of the Bishop. He has also been said to represent the bridge builder, and another figure on the cathedral to represent the cathedral builder. He was originally seated on the roof of a mill, and now sits on the bridge itself on the roof of a miniature toll-house. The current version is the third. The original was replaced in 1579; the current statue was erected on 23 April 1854. The 1579 statue, which lost its legs and arms in the fighting in 1809, is in the Regensburg Museum of History. There was formerly a crucifix on the bridge; it was removed in 1694.

The bridge also has a number of other sculptures: full statues of Emperor Friedrich II (standing on a masked head with ram's horns, and originally on the now demolished north tower; the current statue is a 1930 replica), Philip of Swabia and his consort Queen Irene (both enthroned and originally on the middle tower; Philip's sculpture is a replica) and reliefs including various arms (including both the city and the bridge itself), heads that may be those of the original builder and the rebuilders later in the Middle Ages, a lizard, a basilisk, a weasel, a lion (replaced with a replica in 1966), two roosters fighting and a reclining dog. There were also originally an apotropaic mask and a Roman sculpture of a winged lion on the middle tower. The roosters and the dog have been related to the legend about the building of the bridge; alternatively the Bruckmandl, the basilisk, the dog, the three heads and a now lost "small stone within a large stone" which was in the floor of the watchman's hut next to the middle tower have all been interpreted as Christian symbolism indicating that the bridge was the work of a school of clerical architects.

=== Current use and restoration ===
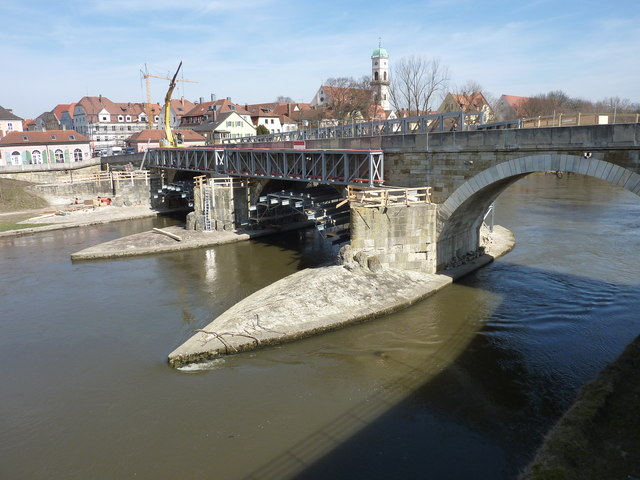
North end of the bridge under repair in March 2010

The bridge and the cathedral are the two major emblems of the city. However, the bridge has been seriously damaged by heavy traffic in recent decades and by water and salt damage from poor drainage and lack of sealing of the masonry. For over a decade, the bridge was closed to private vehicles, and beginning in 2005 it was remotely monitored 24 hours a day from Nuremberg for signs of impending collapse. On the evening of 1 August 2008 it was also closed to buses and taxis and became a pedestrian and bicycle bridge. This was because of a report that the balustrades would be insufficient to stop a bus.

The bridge has been under restoration since 2010; completion was originally expected in 2014 but then postponed until 2017 at the earliest. Temporary bridges are being used to enable the over 120,000 annual users of the bridge to bypass the section being rebuilt. The State of Bavaria conducted a thorough search taking two years and costing 100,000 € to find appropriate stone to use in restoration, similar in colour and structure to the original material of the bridge and sufficiently tough and resistant to weathering. A satisfactory kind of sandstone was eventually found in an abandoned quarry near Ihrlerstein. The bridge is to remain closed to motor vehicles after the renovation.

== Legend ==
There is a legend that the bridge builder and the cathedral builder (who were apprentice and master) had a bet as to who would finish first. When the building of the cathedral progressed faster than that of the bridge, the bridge builder made a pact with the Devil: the Devil would aid him in exchange for the first three souls (or the first eight feet) to cross the bridge. The Devil helped as requested, and the bridge was finished first. But the bridge builder sent a rooster, a hen and a dog across the bridge first. A statue of a falling man on the cathedral is said to represent the master throwing himself off in reaction. Enraged, the Devil attempted to destroy the bridge, but failed, but that is why it is bent. In fact the bridge was already complete when construction began on the cathedral in 1273.

== See also ==
- List of medieval stone bridges in Germany
- List of bridges in Germany
- List of bridges

== Sources ==
- Edith Feistner, ed. Die Steinerne Brücke in Regensburg. Forum Mittelalter 1. Regensburg: Schnell & Steiner, 2005. ISBN 978-3-7954-1699-7 (in German)
- Helmut-Eberhard Paulus. Steinerne Brücke mit Regensburger und Amberger Salzstadel und einem Ausflug zur Historischen Wurstküche. Regensburger Taschenbücher 2. Regensburg: Mittelbayerische Zeitung, 1993. ISBN 978-3-927529-61-8 (in German)
- Hans-Jürgen Becker. "Opus pontis—Stadt und Brücke im Mittelalter: Rechtshistorische Aspekte am Beispiel der Steinernen Brücke zu Regensburg". Zeitschrift für bayerische Landesgeschichte 73 (2010) 355–70 (in German)
