= Nibelungen Bridge (Regensburg) =

Road structure in Regensburg, Germany

Coordinates: 49°1′17″N 12°6′47″E

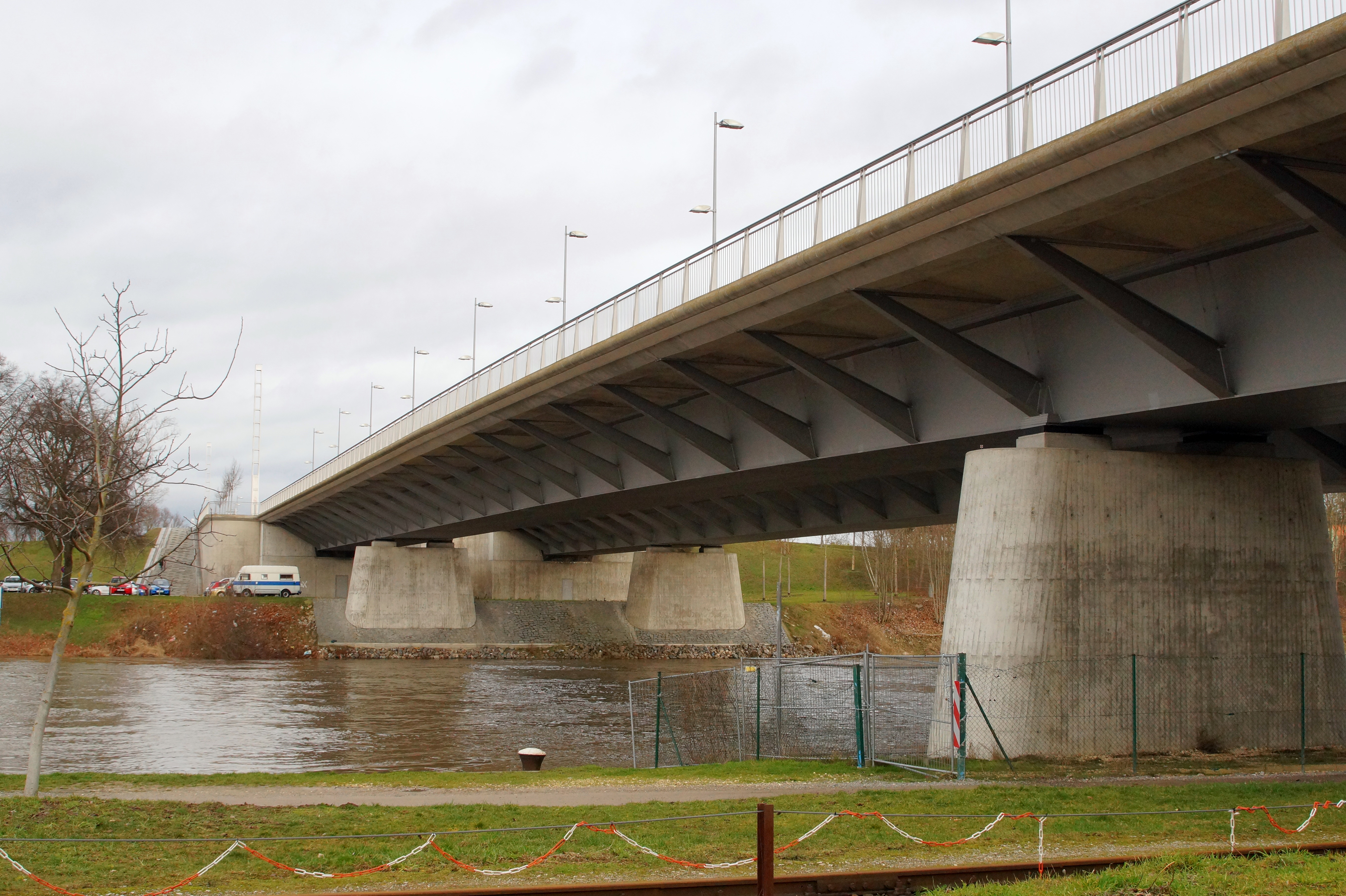
The Nibelungen Bridge in Regensburg.

The Nibelungen Bridge (German: Nibelungenbrücke) is a dual road bridge with two sections spanning both arms of the Danube at kilometre mark 2378.39 in Regensburg, Germany. The current bridge, the third on the site, was erected in 2001–04 to replace a bridge erected in 1950 which was no longer adequate for traffic demands, and which had replaced a bridge built in 1938 and destroyed in World War II. Carrying an average of 42,000 vehicles a day, it is one of the most important bridges in the Regensburg area.

== Current bridge ==
The 2004 Nibelungen Bridge has 6 lanes, two of them reserved exclusively for buses and taxis. It currently forms part of highways B8 and B15. With the Pfaffenstein Bridge and the Schwabelweis Bridge, it is one of only three Danube bridges without load restrictions. The bridge is also important in plans for tram service in Regensburg, as part of the "service axis". As another traffic improvement measure, before the bridge was rebuilt, the streets leading to it at each end were widened. Continuation of this street widening and construction of another bridge over the River Regen are planned, but are unlikely to occur soon.

=== Construction ===
The bridge consists of two sections of similar design over the two arms of the Danube on either side of the Lower Wöhrd, one of the two islands within the city. The southern bridge has a total span length of 168.9 m and also crosses a port railway line. The northern bridge is 206.9 m long. Both are continuous beam construction with three longitudinal sections and a primary span width of 90 m. On the south bridge, the two edge spans are each 39.45 m wide; on the north bridge, 58.45 m. Each bridge section has dual superstructures of 15.4 m width and 3.2 m constant height with a single-cell box girder of composite construction and a diagonally braced cantilevered concrete deck.

== History ==
=== Planning ===
Plans to supplement the Stone Bridge, at that time the only bridge across the Danube at Regensburg, with a new bridge go back to the late 19th century. The Stone Bridge was already overloaded by increased use (both city traffic and through traffic on two Imperial highways) but for unknown reasons the city hesitated. Meanwhile, several smaller bridges were built between the south bank of the river and the two islands (Upper and Lower Wöhrd) which lie within the city, but no additional bridge spanning the entire river. In 1926 a pontoon bridge was built between the Lower Wöhrd and the neighbourhood of Weichs, on the site of the north span of the Nibelungen Bridge. However, this alleviated the traffic problems only slightly because it could not be used by heavy vehicles.

In 1930, definite planning began for a new Danube crossing which could carry heavy traffic. Three possibilities were considered:

1. Extending the Iron Bridge (built in 1863) over the north arm of the Danube with a second span
2. Constructing a new bridge at the Upper Wöhrd, supplementing or replacing a footbridge built there in 1901
3. Constructing a new double-span bridge to extend Weißenburgstraße to Weichs (what became the Nibelungen Bridge)

Firm plans for a new steel bridge were made in 1933. Architect Roderich Fick, suggested by the Bavarian Ministry of the Interior, was engaged to oversee architectural design and the Munich engineering firm of Gerhard & Zenns the structural design. A traffic count on the Stone Bridge on a Saturday in early 1934 counted 40,000 pedestrians, 14,500 cyclists, 5,500 vehicles of all kinds and 278 trams. The city therefore decided to bypass the Old City on the east, to build a new bridge over the River Regen (the Frankenbrücke), and to fund both. In summer the cost of constructing both was estimated at almost ℛℳ 5.05 million, which led to a dispute between the city, the state of Bavaria and the Reichswehr, which was intensely interested in the Danube bridge. In summer 1935 it was agreed that costs would be shared between the Reich, the city, Bavaria and the Reichswehr, and preparations for construction began.

=== 1938 bridge ===
The bridge was named the Adolf Hitler Bridge and at the groundbreaking on 21 December 1935, the Bavarian Minister for the Interior, Adolf Wagner, dedicated it "to the glory of the state, the glory of the Bavarian Ostmark and the glory of National Socialist Germany". Work began with the north span, between the Lower Wöhrd and Weichs; work on the south span, between Weißenburgstraße and the Lower Wöhrd, began in summer 1936. In 1937 the north span opened to traffic and repairs immediately began on the Stone Bridge. On 18 June 1938, the south span and the Frankenbrücke both opened, and on 16 July Minister Wagner ceremonially christened the bridge. Several thousand people attended the festivities and the fireworks that evening.

The bridge was designed by Roderich Fick, with engineering work by Gerhart & Zenns. Fick wanted the new concrete bridge to appear as slender and serene as possible to contrast with the Stone Bridge.

On 23 April 1945, the bridge was blown up to slow the Allied advance, and largely destroyed.

=== 1950 bridge ===
Immediately after the end of the war, work began on clearing rubble and establishing ferry service between Weichs and the Lower Wöhrd to carry traffic; a pontoon bridge was later put in place. In 1950 a replacement bridge, only slightly changed from Fick's design, was opened to traffic and named the Nibelungen Bridge. In 1964 the city expanded the bridge from 2 to 4 lanes by eliminating the pedestrian and bicycle lanes. In 1997 this gradually proved to be a problem, since that year the Stone Bridge was closed to private traffic and thus the Nibelungen Bridge had to accommodate almost 50,000 vehicles per day. Increasing damage to the steel structure required heavy freight to avoid the bridge. Repairs were thus not worthwhile, so planning for a new bridge began in 2001.

=== Construction of the third bridge (2001–04) ===
On 3 March 2001, the foundation stone for the new Nibelungen Bridge was laid by the Lord Mayor of Regensburg, Hans Schaidinger, and the Bavarian Interior Minister, Günther Beckstein. The old bridge first had to be moved 8 m laterally so that traffic could continue to use it. Use of the bridge by traffic continued without further restrictions until July, when the eastbound lanes had to be closed for 4 weeks while the bridge pillars were extended 10 m and rails installed in preparation for shifting the old bridge. Buses were nonetheless able to continue to use the northern half of the bridge except on the moving day itself. Moving began on 8 August; on 30 August 2001, the entire length of the bridge reopened after the move.

Work began on the new western spans in August 2001 and was completed on 9 November 2002. Traffic was then redirected across the new half, and the old bridge was for the most part demolished or exploded. After all the rubble was cleared, construction of the eastern spans began and was completed in April 2004. After the bridge was fully open to traffic, final tasks consisted of making permanent roadway markings and constructing pedestrian and bicycle paths on the west side; during construction there had not been space for these. All construction was complete in mid-June 2004.

The cost of the bridge was increased by at least DM7.6 million by the need to acquire more steel because of a data entry error combined with underestimation.

== Sculpture ==
For the 1938 Adolf Hitler Bridge, Munich sculptor Albert Allman was commissioned to carve a group of maidens and a monumental Nazi eagle. Allman had little experience as a monumental sculptor; he was known for art deco nudes. He requested porphyry, an extremely durable stone, for the eagle but was required to use granite. He began work over a year late; when the bridge was dedicated, the eagle was not yet ready and was ineptly added to the official photographs by retouching. When completed in 1939, the 9-metre eagle weighed 12 tonnes and had cost RM18,000. In March 1940 it was installed at a semicircular lookout between the two parts of the bridge.

The eagle was mounted on the 1950 Nibelungen Bridge as a federal eagle, facing east, with the swastika omitted from the oak garland in its claws. It was frequently defaced with graffiti and painted various colours. The maidens were also placed on the new bridge.

On 11 July 2001, as part of the preparations for moving the 1950 bridge before its demolition, the eagle and the maidens were moved into storage. It was announced at the time that the city would find an appropriate use for the eagle, but as of 2008 it was still in storage, despite a 2003 invitation for proposals from well-known artists and an exhibit of the suggestions, which included wrapping it in the manner of Christo and permitting nature to reclaim it by letting grass grow over it. Other ideas have included smashing it and reassembling it randomly, and a local entrepreneur once offered to buy it and put it in his garden.

== Associated structures ==
A fish market formed part of the 1950 bridge, but apparently did not exist for long.

From 1964 to 2001 the Eisstadion an der Nibelungenbrücke, former home of the Regensburg ice hockey club, stood on the island next to the 1950 bridge; it was torn down during construction of the new bridge.

A neighbourhood parking garage for almost 70 vehicles is located behind the south abutment of the current bridge.
