= List of Michelin-starred restaurants in Germany =

Germany has 339 restaurants with a Michelin-star rating as of the 2026 Michelin Guide.

The Michelin Guides have been published by the French tire company Michelin since 1900. They were designed as a guide to tell drivers about eateries they recommended to visit and to subtly sponsor their tires, by encouraging drivers to use their cars more and therefore need to replace the tires as they wore out. Over time, the stars that were given out started to become more valuable.

Multiple anonymous Michelin inspectors visit the restaurants several times. They rate the restaurants on five criteria: "quality of products", "mastery of flavor and cooking techniques", "the personality of the chef represented in the dining experience", "value for money", and "consistency between inspectors' visits". Inspectors have at least ten years of expertise and create a list of popular restaurants supported by media reports, reviews, and diner popularity. If they reach a consensus, Michelin awards restaurants from one to three stars based on its evaluation methodology: One star means "high-quality cooking, worth a stop", two stars signify "excellent cooking, worth a detour", and three stars denote "exceptional cuisine, worth a special journey". The stars are not permanent and restaurants are constantly being re-evaluated. If the criteria are not met, the restaurant will lose its stars.

The Michelin Guide first launched in Germany in 1910.

== Baden-Württemberg ==
As of the 2026 guide, there are 73 restaurants in Baden-Württemberg with a Michelin-star rating.

Key
1 Michelin star	One Michelin star
2 Michelin stars	Two Michelin stars
3 Michelin stars	Three Michelin stars
—	The restaurant did not receive a star that year
Closed	The restaurant is no longer open

Michelin-starred restaurants
Name	Cuisine	Location	2023	2024	2025	2026
5	Modern	Stuttgart	1 Michelin star	1 Michelin star	1 Michelin star	1 Michelin star
1789	Asian Fusion	Baiersbronn	1 Michelin star	1 Michelin star	1 Michelin star	1 Michelin star
Adler	French	Lahr	1 Michelin star	1 Michelin star	1 Michelin star	1 Michelin star
Alte Baiz	Modern	Neuhausen	1 Michelin star	1 Michelin star	1 Michelin star	1 Michelin star
ammolite - The Lighthouse	French	Rust	2 Michelin stars	2 Michelin stars	2 Michelin stars	2 Michelin stars
ANIMA	Creative	Tuttlingen	1 Michelin star	1 Michelin star	1 Michelin star	1 Michelin star
Bachofer	Fusion	Waiblingen	1 Michelin star	1 Michelin star	1 Michelin star	1 Michelin star
Bareiss	French	Baiersbronn	3 Michelin stars	3 Michelin stars	3 Michelin stars	3 Michelin stars
bi:braud	Contemporary	Ulm	1 Michelin star	1 Michelin star	1 Michelin star	1 Michelin star
Cafe Gupi	German	Weil am Rhein	—	—	—	1 Michelin star
Casala	Modern	Meersburg	1 Michelin star	1 Michelin star	1 Michelin star	—
Cédric	French	Weinstadt	—	1 Michelin star	1 Michelin star	1 Michelin star
Colombi Restaurant Zirbelstube	French	Freiburg im Breisgau	1 Michelin star	1 Michelin star	1 Michelin star	1 Michelin star
Das garbo zum Löwen	French	Eggenstein-Leopoldshafen	1 Michelin star	1 Michelin star	1 Michelin star	1 Michelin star
Das Philippin	German	Rutesheim	—	—	—	1 Michelin star
Delice	Mediterranean	Stuttgart	1 Michelin star	1 Michelin star	1 Michelin star	1 Michelin star
Der Zauberlehrling	Creative	Stuttgart	1 Michelin star	1 Michelin star	1 Michelin star	1 Michelin star
die burg	German	Donaueschingen	1 Michelin star	1 Michelin star	1 Michelin star	1 Michelin star
Dobler's	German	Mannheim	1 Michelin star	1 Michelin star	1 Michelin star	1 Michelin star
Eatrenalin	International	Rust	—	—	—	1 Michelin star
Eckert	Creative	Grenzach-Wyhlen	1 Michelin star	1 Michelin star	1 Michelin star	1 Michelin star
Eichhalde	Italian	Freiburg im Breisgau	1 Michelin star	1 Michelin star	1 Michelin star	1 Michelin star
Eisenbahn	French	Schwäbisch Hall	1 Michelin star	1 Michelin star	1 Michelin star	1 Michelin star
Erbprinz	German	Ettlingen	1 Michelin star	1 Michelin star	1 Michelin star	1 Michelin star
Esszimmer im Oberschwäbischen Hof	French	Schwendi	1 Michelin star	1 Michelin star	1 Michelin star	1 Michelin star
Falconera	French	Öhningen	1 Michelin star	1 Michelin star	1 Michelin star	1 Michelin star
Gasthaus zum Raben	French	Horben	1 Michelin star	—	—	—
Gasthof Krone	German	Waldenbuch	1 Michelin star	1 Michelin star	1 Michelin star	1 Michelin star
Gasthof Zum Bad	German	Langenau	1 Michelin star	—	—	—
Genuss-Apotheke	Creative	Bad Säckingen	1 Michelin star	1 Michelin star	1 Michelin star	1 Michelin star
Gourmetrestaurant "fine dining RS"	French	Salach	1 Michelin star	1 Michelin star	1 Michelin star	1 Michelin star
Gourmetrestaurant Berlins Krone	French	Bad Teinach-Zavelstein	1 Michelin star	1 Michelin star	1 Michelin star	1 Michelin star
Gourmetrestaurant Nico Burkhardt	French	Schorndorf	1 Michelin star	1 Michelin star	1 Michelin star	1 Michelin star
Hawara	German	Freiburg im Breisgau	—	—	1 Michelin star	1 Michelin star
Hegel Eins	Modern	Stuttgart	1 Michelin star	1 Michelin star	1 Michelin star	—
Hirsch	German	Sonnenbühl	1 Michelin star	1 Michelin star	1 Michelin star	1 Michelin star
Hirschen	Creative	Sulzburg	2 Michelin stars	2 Michelin stars	2 Michelin stars	2 Michelin stars
Hirschgasse – Le Gourmet	German	Heidelberg	1 Michelin star	Closed		
Hochzwei	German	Langenau	—	1 Michelin star	1 Michelin star	1 Michelin star
Hupperts	German	Stuttgart	1 Michelin star	1 Michelin star	1 Michelin star	1 Michelin star
Jacobi	Innovative	Freiburg im Breisgau	—	1 Michelin star	1 Michelin star	1 Michelin star
Kaisersaal	French	Ravensburg	—	—	1 Michelin star	1 Michelin star
Laesâ	Modern	Stuttgart	—	—	—	1 Michelin star
Lamm Rosswag	Modern	Vaihingen an der Enz	1 Michelin star	1 Michelin star	1 Michelin star	1 Michelin star
Landhaus Feckl	French	Ehningen	1 Michelin star	1 Michelin star	1 Michelin star	1 Michelin star
Laurentius	German	Weikersheim	1 Michelin star	1 Michelin star	1 Michelin star	—
Le Cerf	French	Zweiflingen	2 Michelin stars	2 Michelin stars	2 Michelin stars	2 Michelin stars
Le Jardin de France im Stahlbad	French	Baden-Baden	1 Michelin star	1 Michelin star	1 Michelin star	1 Michelin star
Le Pavillon	French	Bad Peterstal	2 Michelin stars	2 Michelin stars	2 Michelin stars	2 Michelin stars
Maerz - Das Restaurant	French	Bietigheim-Bissingen	1 Michelin star	1 Michelin star	1 Michelin star	1 Michelin star
Malathounis	Greek	Kernen	1 Michelin star	1 Michelin star	1 Michelin star	1 Michelin star
Maltes Hidden Kitchen	Modern	Baden-Baden	1 Michelin star	1 Michelin star	1 Michelin star	1 Michelin star
Marly	French	Mannheim	1 Michelin star	—	—	—
Merkles	Modern	Endingen am Kaiserstuhl	1 Michelin star	1 Michelin star	1 Michelin star	1 Michelin star
Mühle	French	Schluchsee	2 Michelin stars	2 Michelin stars	1 Michelin star	2 Michelin stars
Oben	Creative	Heidelberg	1 Michelin star	1 Michelin star	1 Michelin star	1 Michelin star
Oettinger's	French	Fellbach	1 Michelin star	1 Michelin star	1 Michelin star	1 Michelin star
Ophelia	French	Konstanz	2 Michelin stars	2 Michelin stars	2 Michelin stars	2 Michelin stars
OPUS V	Modern	Mannheim	2 Michelin stars	2 Michelin stars	2 Michelin stars	2 Michelin stars
Ösch Noir	German	Donaueschingen	2 Michelin stars	2 Michelin stars	2 Michelin stars	2 Michelin stars
Raro im Mühlenhof	German	Schriesheim	—	—	1 Michelin star	1 Michelin star
Rebers Pflug	German	Schwäbisch Hall	1 Michelin star	1 Michelin star	1 Michelin star	1 Michelin star
Restaurant 1950	German	Hayingen	—	1 Michelin star	1 Michelin star	1 Michelin star
Restaurant auf Schloss Filseck	Mediterranean	Uhingen	1 Michelin star	1 Michelin star	1 Michelin star	1 Michelin star
Ritzi Gourmet	French	Stuttgart	1 Michelin star	Closed		
s’Äpfle	Modern	Bodman-Ludwigshafen	1 Michelin star	—	—	Closed
San Martino	Italian	Konstanz	1 Michelin star	Closed		
Schattbuch	Creative	Amtzell	1 Michelin star	1 Michelin star	1 Michelin star	—
Schlossberg	German	Baiersbronn	1 Michelin star	1 Michelin star	1 Michelin star	1 Michelin star
Schwabenstube	German	Asperg	1 Michelin star	1 Michelin star	1 Michelin star	1 Michelin star
Schwarzwaldstube	French	Baiersbronn	3 Michelin stars	3 Michelin stars	3 Michelin stars	3 Michelin stars
Schwarzer Adler	French	Vogtsburg im Kaiserstuhl	1 Michelin star	1 Michelin star	1 Michelin star	1 Michelin star
Schwitzer's	German	Waldbronn	1 Michelin star	1 Michelin star	1 Michelin star	1 Michelin star
Seestern	French	Ulm	1 Michelin star	1 Michelin star	1 Michelin star	1 Michelin star
sein	Modern	Karlsruhe	2 Michelin stars	2 Michelin stars	2 Michelin stars	2 Michelin stars
SEO Küchenhandwerk	German	Langenargen	1 Michelin star	2 Michelin stars	—	Closed
SIEDEPUNKT	Creative	Ulm	1 Michelin star	—	—	—
Speisemeisterei	Creative	Stuttgart	2 Michelin stars	2 Michelin stars	2 Michelin stars	2 Michelin stars
Storchen	German	Bad Krozingen	1 Michelin star	1 Michelin star	1 Michelin star	1 Michelin star
TAWA YAMA FINE	Asian Fusion	Karlsruhe	1 Michelin star	1 Michelin star	1 Michelin star	Closed
The Tourist Trap	Modern	Mannheim	—	—	—	1 Michelin star
Traube	Modern	Efringen-Kirchen	1 Michelin star	1 Michelin star	1 Michelin star	1 Michelin star
Ursprung	Creative	Königsbronn	1 Michelin star	1 Michelin star	1 Michelin star	1 Michelin star
Werners	French	Gernsbach	1 Michelin star	1 Michelin star	1 Michelin star	1 Michelin star
Wielandshöhe	French	Stuttgart	1 Michelin star	1 Michelin star	1 Michelin star	1 Michelin star
zeitgeist	French	Weingarten	1 Michelin star	—	—	—
Zur Weinsteige	German	Stuttgart	—	1 Michelin star	1 Michelin star	1 Michelin star
Zur Wolfshöhle	German	Freiburg im Breisgau	1 Michelin star	1 Michelin star	1 Michelin star	1 Michelin star
Reference						

== Bavaria ==
As of the 2026 guide, there are 80 restaurants in Bavaria with a Michelin-star rating

Key
1 Michelin star	One Michelin star
2 Michelin stars	Two Michelin stars
3 Michelin stars	Three Michelin stars
—	The restaurant did not receive a star that year
Closed	The restaurant is no longer open

Michelin-starred restaurants
Name	Cuisine	Location	2023	2024	2025	2026
271	Modern	Upper Bavaria – Burghausen	—	1 Michelin star	1 Michelin star	Closed
1804 Hirschau	Modern	Munich – Schwabing-Freimann	—	—	1 Michelin star	1 Michelin star
Acquarello	Italian	Munich – Bogenhausen	1 Michelin star	1 Michelin star	—	—
Alois	Modern	Munich – Old Town	2 Michelin stars	2 Michelin stars	2 Michelin stars	2 Michelin stars
Alte Liebe	Modern	Swabia – Augsburg	1 Michelin star	1 Michelin star	1 Michelin star	1 Michelin star
Aska	Japanese	Upper Palatinate – Regensburg	1 Michelin star	1 Michelin star	1 Michelin star	1 Michelin star
Atelier	French	Munich – Old Town	2 Michelin stars	2 Michelin stars	2 Michelin stars	2 Michelin stars
Aubergine	Modern	Upper Bavaria – Starnberg	1 Michelin star	1 Michelin star	1 Michelin star	1 Michelin star
AUGUST	Modern	Swabia – Augsburg	2 Michelin stars	2 Michelin stars	2 Michelin stars	2 Michelin stars
AURA (Note: Was named Alexander Herrmann by Tobias Bätz until 2024)	Modern	Upper Franconia – Wirsberg	2 Michelin stars	2 Michelin stars	2 Michelin stars	2 Michelin stars
Brothers	Modern	Munich – Maxvorstadt	1 Michelin star	1 Michelin star	1 Michelin star	1 Michelin star
Buchner Welchenberg 1658	Modern	Lower Bavaria – Niederwinkling	1 Michelin star	1 Michelin star	1 Michelin star	1 Michelin star
Camers	Fusion	Upper Bavaria – Hohenkammer	1 Michelin star	1 Michelin star	Closed	
Cheval Blanc	German	Upper Palatinate – Illschwang	1 Michelin star	1 Michelin star	1 Michelin star	1 Michelin star
Christian Jürgens	Modern	Upper Bavaria – Rottach-Egern	3 Michelin stars	Closed		
Christian's Restaurant	German	Upper Bavaria – Kirchdorf	1 Michelin star	1 Michelin star	1 Michelin star	1 Michelin star
Cølbo	Vegetarian	Klingenberg am Main	—	—	—	1 Michelin star
Das Marktrestaurant	German	Upper Bavaria – Mittenwald	1 Michelin star	1 Michelin star	1 Michelin star	1 Michelin star
Das Maximilians	Mediterranean	Swabia – Oberstdorf	1 Michelin star	—	—	—
Die Gourmet Stube (Note: Was named Hummels Gourmetstube until 2024)	German	Upper Palatinate – Duggendorf	1 Michelin star	1 Michelin star	1 Michelin star	1 Michelin star
edl.eins	French	Lower Bavaria – Deggendorf	—	1 Michelin star	1 Michelin star	1 Michelin star
Entenstuben	Modern	Middle Franconia – Nuremberg	1 Michelin star	1 Michelin star	1 Michelin star	1 Michelin star
Epicures	French	Upper Bavaria – Aschau im Chiemgau	—	—	1 Michelin star	1 Michelin star
ES:SENZ	Modern	Upper Bavaria – Grassau	2 Michelin stars	3 Michelin stars	3 Michelin stars	3 Michelin stars
Ess Atelier Strauss	German	Swabia – Oberstdorf	1 Michelin star	1 Michelin star	1 Michelin star	1 Michelin star
Essigbrätlein	Modern	Middle Franconia – Nuremberg	2 Michelin stars	2 Michelin stars	2 Michelin stars	2 Michelin stars
EssZimmer	French	Munich – Milbertshofen-Am Hart	2 Michelin stars	2 Michelin stars	Closed	
etz	German	Middle Franconia – Nuremberg	2 Michelin stars	2 Michelin stars	2 Michelin stars	2 Michelin stars
Gabelspiel	Modern	Munich – Obergiesing	1 Michelin star	1 Michelin star	1 Michelin star	1 Michelin star
Gasthaus Jakob	German	Lower Bavaria – Perasdorf	1 Michelin star	1 Michelin star	1 Michelin star	1 Michelin star
Gasthof Alex	Modern	Upper Franconia – Weißenbrunn	1 Michelin star	1 Michelin star	1 Michelin star	1 Michelin star
Gourmetrestaurant Dichter	French	Upper Bavaria – Rottach-Egern	2 Michelin stars	2 Michelin stars	2 Michelin stars	2 Michelin stars
Haubentaucher	International	Upper Bavaria – Rottach-Egern	1 Michelin star	1 Michelin star	1 Michelin star	1 Michelin star
Huberwirt	Modern	Upper Bavaria – Pleiskirchen	1 Michelin star	1 Michelin star	—	—
IKIGAI	Asian Fusion	Upper Bavaria – Krün	—	2 Michelin stars	2 Michelin stars	2 Michelin stars
JAN	Modern	Munich – Maxvorstadt	3 Michelin stars	3 Michelin stars	3 Michelin stars	3 Michelin stars
Johanns	Modern	Lower Bavaria – Waldkirchen	1 Michelin star	1 Michelin star	1 Michelin star	1 Michelin star
June	German	Upper Bavaria – Übersee	—	—	1 Michelin star	1 Michelin star
KARRisma	Modern	Swabia – Lindau	—	1 Michelin star	1 Michelin star	1 Michelin star
Keidenzeller Hof	Modern	Middle Franconia – Langenzenn	1 Michelin star	1 Michelin star	1 Michelin star	1 Michelin star
Koch und Kellner	Modern	Middle Franconia – Nuremberg	1 Michelin star	1 Michelin star	—	—
KOMU	German	Munich – Old Town	—	2 Michelin stars	2 Michelin stars	2 Michelin stars
KOOK 36	Asian Fusion	Lower Bavaria – Deggendorf	1 Michelin star	1 Michelin star	—	Closed
KUNO 1408	Modern	Lower Franconia – Würzburg	1 Michelin star	1 Michelin star	1 Michelin star	1 Michelin star
La Boucherie	Contemporary	Lower Franconia – Kreuzwertheim	—	—	1 Michelin star	1 Michelin star
Laudensacks	German	Lower Franconia – Bad Kissingen	1 Michelin star	1 Michelin star	1 Michelin star	1 Michelin star
Le Frankenberg	French	Middle Franconia – Weigenheim	—	1 Michelin star	1 Michelin star	—
Lech-Line	Modern	Upper Bavaria – Landsberg am Lech	—	1 Michelin star	1 Michelin star	1 Michelin star
Leos	German	Upper Palatinate – Bad Kötzting	1 Michelin star	1 Michelin star	1 Michelin star	1 Michelin star
Les Deux	French	Munich – Old Town	1 Michelin star	1 Michelin star	1 Michelin star	1 Michelin star
Luce d’Oro	Modern	Upper Bavaria – Krün	2 Michelin stars	Closed		
Marcel von Winckelmann	Fusion	Lower Bavaria – Passau	—	—	1 Michelin star	1 Michelin star
Michaels Leitenberg	Modern	Upper Bavaria – Frasdorf	1 Michelin star	1 Michelin star	1 Michelin star	1 Michelin star
Mind	Modern	Upper Bavaria – Markt Indersdorf	—	1 Michelin star	1 Michelin star	1 Michelin star
Mittermeier	Modern	Middle Franconia – Rothenburg ob der Tauber	—	1 Michelin star	1 Michelin star	1 Michelin star
MiZAR	Modern	Lower Franconia – Würzburg	—	—	1 Michelin star	1 Michelin star
Mountain Hub Gourmet	Modern	Munich – Airport	1 Michelin star	1 Michelin star	1 Michelin star	1 Michelin star
mural	German	Munich – Old Town	1 Michelin star	1 Michelin star	—	—
mural farmhouse	German	Munich – Obersendling	1 Michelin star	1 Michelin star	—	Closed
Nose & Belly	Innovative	Swabia – Augsburg	—	—	1 Michelin star	1 Michelin star
Obendorfers Eisvogel	Contemporary	Upper Palatinate – Neunburg vorm Wald	2 Michelin stars	2 Michelin stars	2 Michelin stars	2 Michelin stars
Ontra's Gourmetstube	Modern	Upper Palatinate – Regensburg	—	—	1 Michelin star	1 Michelin star
Oswald's Gourmetstube	French	Lower Bavaria – Teisnach	1 Michelin star	1 Michelin star	2 Michelin stars	2 Michelin stars
Pavo	German	Swabia – Pfronten	1 Michelin star	1 Michelin star	1 Michelin star	1 Michelin star
Philipp	French	Lower Franconia – Sommerhausen	1 Michelin star	1 Michelin star	1 Michelin star	1 Michelin star
PUR	Modern	Upper Bavaria – Berchtesgaden	1 Michelin star	2 Michelin stars	2 Michelin stars	2 Michelin stars
Restaurant Alexander Huber	Modern	Upper Bavaria – Pleiskirchen	—	—	1 Michelin star	1 Michelin star
Restaurant Karner	German	Upper Bavaria – Frasdorf	1 Michelin star	1 Michelin star	1 Michelin star	1 Michelin star
Restaurant Residenz Heinz Winkler	French	Upper Bavaria – Aschau im Chiemgau	—	1 Michelin star	—	Closed
Roter Hahn	Modern	Upper Palatinate – Regensburg	1 Michelin star	1 Michelin star	1 Michelin star	—
Sartory	German	Swabia – Augsburg	1 Michelin star	1 Michelin star	1 Michelin star	1 Michelin star
Schwingshackl ESSKULTUR	German	Lower Bavaria – Bernried	1 Michelin star	1 Michelin star	1 Michelin star	1 Michelin star
Showroom	Modern	Munich – Au-Haidhausen	1 Michelin star	1 Michelin star	1 Michelin star	—
Silberdistel	German	Swabia – Ofterschwang	1 Michelin star	1 Michelin star	1 Michelin star	1 Michelin star
Sparkling Bistro	Modern	Munich – Maxvorstadt	1 Michelin star	1 Michelin star	1 Michelin star	1 Michelin star
Solo Du	Modern	Upper Bavaria – Bischofswiesen	1 Michelin star	1 Michelin star	1 Michelin star	1 Michelin star
SoulFood	Soul	Upper Palatinate – Auerbach in der Oberpfalz	1 Michelin star	1 Michelin star	1 Michelin star	1 Michelin star
Staderer	French	Eichstätt	—	—	—	1 Michelin star
Stephans Stuben	Creative	Swabia – Neu-Ulm	—	—	1 Michelin star	1 Michelin star
Storstad	Modern	Upper Palatinate – Regensburg	1 Michelin star	1 Michelin star	1 Michelin star	1 Michelin star
Tantris	French	Munich – Schwabing-Freimann	2 Michelin stars	2 Michelin stars	2 Michelin stars	2 Michelin stars
Tantris DNA	French	Munich – Schwabing-Freimann	1 Michelin star	1 Michelin star	1 Michelin star	1 Michelin star
The Cloud	International	Munich – Au-Haidhausen	—	—	—	2 Michelin stars
Tisane	Modern	Middle Franconia – Nuremberg	1 Michelin star	1 Michelin star	1 Michelin star	1 Michelin star
Tohru	Japanese	Munich – Old Town	2 Michelin stars	2 Michelin stars	3 Michelin stars	3 Michelin stars
Überfahrt	German	Upper Bavaria – Rottach-Egern	—	—	1 Michelin star	1 Michelin star
Veles	Modern	Middle Franconia – Nuremberg	1 Michelin star	1 Michelin star	1 Michelin star	1 Michelin star
Villino	Asian Fusion	Swabia – Lindau	1 Michelin star	1 Michelin star	1 Michelin star	1 Michelin star
Wachter Foodbar	German	Upper Bavaria – Prien am Chiemsee	1 Michelin star	1 Michelin star	1 Michelin star	1 Michelin star
Waidwerk	Modern	Middle Franconia – Nuremberg	1 Michelin star	1 Michelin star	1 Michelin star	1 Michelin star
Weinstock	Modern	Lower Franconia – Volkach	1 Michelin star	1 Michelin star	1 Michelin star	1 Michelin star
Werneckhof Sigi Schelling	French	Munich – Schwabing-Freimann	1 Michelin star	1 Michelin star	1 Michelin star	1 Michelin star
Winzerhof Stahl	Modern	Middle Franconia – Simmershofen	—	1 Michelin star	1 Michelin star	1 Michelin star
Wirtshaus Meyers Keller	German	Swabia – Nördlingen	1 Michelin star	1 Michelin star	1 Michelin star	1 Michelin star
Wonka	Asian Fusion	Middle Franconia – Nuremberg	—	1 Michelin star	1 Michelin star	1 Michelin star
ZweiSinn Meiers	Modern	Middle Franconia – Nuremberg	1 Michelin star	1 Michelin star	1 Michelin star	1 Michelin star
Reference						

== Berlin ==
As of the 2026 guide, there are 19 restaurants in Berlin with a Michelin-star rating.

Key
1 Michelin star	One Michelin star
2 Michelin stars	Two Michelin stars
3 Michelin stars	Three Michelin stars
—	The restaurant did not receive a star that year
Closed	The restaurant is no longer open

Michelin-starred restaurants
Name	Cuisine	Borough	2022	2023	2024	2025	2026
Bandol sur mer	Creative	Mitte	1 Michelin star	1 Michelin star	1 Michelin star	1 Michelin star	1 Michelin star
Bieberbau	Modern	Charlottenburg-Wilmersdorf	1 Michelin star	1 Michelin star	1 Michelin star	1 Michelin star	—
Bonvivant	Vegetarian	Tempelhof-Schöneberg	—	1 Michelin star	1 Michelin star	1 Michelin star	1 Michelin star
Bricole	French	Pankow	1 Michelin star	1 Michelin star	1 Michelin star	1 Michelin star	1 Michelin star
CODA Dessert Dining	Dessert	Neukölln	2 Michelin stars	2 Michelin stars	2 Michelin stars	2 Michelin stars	2 Michelin stars
Cookies Cream	Vegetarian	Mitte	1 Michelin star	1 Michelin star	1 Michelin star	1 Michelin star	1 Michelin star
Cordo	German	Mitte	1 Michelin star	1 Michelin star	Closed		
Einsunternull	German	Mitte	1 Michelin star	Closed			
Ernst	Japanese	Mitte	1 Michelin star	1 Michelin star	Closed		
FACIL	Contemporary	Mitte	2 Michelin stars	2 Michelin stars	2 Michelin stars	2 Michelin stars	2 Michelin stars
faelt	Contemporary	Tempelhof-Schöneberg	1 Michelin star	1 Michelin star	1 Michelin star	—	Closed
Frühsammers	Modern	Charlottenburg-Wilmersdorf	1 Michelin star	Closed			
GOLVET	Creative	Mitte	1 Michelin star	1 Michelin star	1 Michelin star	1 Michelin star	1 Michelin star
hallmann & klee	Modern	Neukölln	—	—	1 Michelin star	1 Michelin star	1 Michelin star
Horváth	Creative	Friedrichshain-Kreuzberg	2 Michelin stars	2 Michelin stars	2 Michelin stars	2 Michelin stars	2 Michelin stars
Hugos	Modern	Mitte	1 Michelin star	1 Michelin star	1 Michelin star	1 Michelin star	1 Michelin star
Irma la Douce	French	Mitte	1 Michelin star	1 Michelin star	1 Michelin star	1 Michelin star	1 Michelin star
Kin Dee	Thai	Mitte	1 Michelin star	—	—	—	—
Lorenz Adlon Esszimmer	Creative	Mitte	2 Michelin stars	2 Michelin stars	2 Michelin stars	1 Michelin star	1 Michelin star
Loumi	Asian Fusion	Friedrichshain-Kreuzberg	—	—	—	1 Michelin star	1 Michelin star
Matthias	French	Pankow	—	—	—	1 Michelin star	1 Michelin star
Nobelhart & Schmutzig	German	Friedrichshain-Kreuzberg	1 Michelin star	1 Michelin star	1 Michelin star	1 Michelin star	1 Michelin star
Pars	Modern	Charlottenburg-Wilmersdorf	—	—	—	1 Michelin star	1 Michelin star
prism	Israeli	Charlottenburg-Wilmersdorf	1 Michelin star	1 Michelin star	1 Michelin star	1 Michelin star	Closed
Richard	French	Friedrichshain-Kreuzberg	1 Michelin star	1 Michelin star	Closed		
Rutz	Modern	Mitte	3 Michelin stars	3 Michelin stars	3 Michelin stars	3 Michelin stars	3 Michelin stars
SKYKITCHEN	Modern	Lichtenberg	1 Michelin star	1 Michelin star	1 Michelin star	1 Michelin star	—
The NOName	Modern	Mitte	—	1 Michelin star	Closed		
Tim Raue	Pan-Asian	Friedrichshain-Kreuzberg	2 Michelin stars	2 Michelin stars	2 Michelin stars	2 Michelin stars	2 Michelin stars
tulus lotrek	Modern	Friedrichshain-Kreuzberg	1 Michelin star	1 Michelin star	1 Michelin star	1 Michelin star	1 Michelin star
Reference							

== Brandenburg ==
As of 2026, there are 2 restaurants with a Michelin-star rating in the state of Brandenburg.

Key
1 Michelin star	One Michelin star
—	The restaurant did not receive a star that year

Michelin-starred restaurants
Name	Cuisine	Location	2023	2024	2025	2026
Alte Überfahrt	Modern	Werder	1 Michelin star	1 Michelin star	1 Michelin star	1 Michelin star
kochZIMMER	Modern	Potsdam	1 Michelin star	1 Michelin star	1 Michelin star	—
Sawito	International	Falkensee	—	—	1 Michelin star	1 Michelin star
Reference						

== Bremen ==
As of 2026, there are no restaurants with a Michelin-star rating in the city-state of Bremen. While Michelin reviews restaurants in Bremen, no restaurants were awarded a star for this edition.

== Hamburg ==
As of 2026, there are 16 restaurants with a Michelin-star rating in the city-state of Hamburg.

Key
1 Michelin star	One Michelin star
2 Michelin stars	Two Michelin stars
3 Michelin stars	Three Michelin stars
—	The restaurant did not receive a star that year
Closed	The restaurant is no longer open

Michelin-starred restaurants
Name	Cuisine	Borough	2023	2024	2025	2026
100/200 Kitchen	Modern	Mitte	2 Michelin stars	2 Michelin stars	2 Michelin stars	2 Michelin stars
Arc	German	Eimsbüttel	—	—	—	1 Michelin star
Atlantic	French	Mitte	—	1 Michelin star	1 Michelin star	1 Michelin star
bianc	Mediterranean	Mitte	2 Michelin stars	2 Michelin stars	2 Michelin stars	Closed
Glorie	German	Mitte	—	—	1 Michelin star	1 Michelin star
haebel	Modern	Altona	1 Michelin star	1 Michelin star	1 Michelin star	1 Michelin star
Heimatjuwel	Creative	Eimsbüttel	—	—	1 Michelin star	1 Michelin star
Jellyfish	Seafood	Eimsbüttel	1 Michelin star	1 Michelin star	1 Michelin star	1 Michelin star
Koer	Creative	Nord	—	—	1 Michelin star	1 Michelin star
Lakeside	Modern	Eimsbüttel	2 Michelin stars	2 Michelin stars	2 Michelin stars	2 Michelin stars
Landhaus Scherrer	German	Altona	1 Michelin star	1 Michelin star	1 Michelin star	1 Michelin star
Petit Amour	French	Altona	—	1 Michelin star	1 Michelin star	1 Michelin star
Piment	North African	Nord	1 Michelin star	1 Michelin star	1 Michelin star	1 Michelin star
Restaurant Haerlin	French	Mitte	2 Michelin stars	2 Michelin stars	3 Michelin stars	3 Michelin stars
The Lisbeth	German	Mitte	—	1 Michelin star	1 Michelin star	1 Michelin star
The Table Kevin Fehling	Creative	Mitte	3 Michelin stars	3 Michelin stars	3 Michelin stars	3 Michelin stars
Zeik	German	Nord	1 Michelin star	1 Michelin star	1 Michelin star	1 Michelin star
Reference						

== Hesse ==
As of 2026, there are 19 restaurants with a Michelin-star rating in the German state of Hesse, which includes the city of Frankfurt.

Key
1 Michelin star	One Michelin star
2 Michelin stars	Two Michelin stars
—	The restaurant did not receive a star that year
Closed	The restaurant is no longer open

Michelin-starred restaurants
Name	Cuisine	Location	2023	2024	2025	2026
360°	Modern	Limburg an der Lahn	1 Michelin star	1 Michelin star	1 Michelin star	1 Michelin star
Bidlabu	German	Frankfurt	1 Michelin star	1 Michelin star	1 Michelin star	1 Michelin star
Carmelo Greco	Italian	Frankfurt	1 Michelin star	1 Michelin star	1 Michelin star	—
Christian & Friends	German	Fulda	1 Michelin star	1 Michelin star	1 Michelin star	1 Michelin star
Ente	Creative	Wiesbaden	1 Michelin star	1 Michelin star	1 Michelin star	1 Michelin star
Erno's Bistro	French	Frankfurt	1 Michelin star	1 Michelin star	1 Michelin star	1 Michelin star
Gustav	German	Frankfurt	2 Michelin stars	Closed		
Jean	French	Eltville am Rhein	1 Michelin star	1 Michelin star	1 Michelin star	1 Michelin star
L'étable	German	Bad Hersfeld	1 Michelin star	1 Michelin star	1 Michelin star	1 Michelin star
La Vallée Verte	French	Herleshausen	1 Michelin star	1 Michelin star	1 Michelin star	1 Michelin star
Lafleur	French	Frankfurt	2 Michelin stars	2 Michelin stars	2 Michelin stars	2 Michelin stars
Lohninger	Austrian	Frankfurt	—	—	—	1 Michelin star
Main Tower Restaurant & Lounge	Asian Fusion	Frankfurt	1 Michelin star	1 Michelin star	1 Michelin star	1 Michelin star
MARBURGER Esszimmer	French	Marburg	1 Michelin star	1 Michelin star	1 Michelin star	Closed
Masa	Japanese	Frankfurt	1 Michelin star	1 Michelin star	1 Michelin star	1 Michelin star
Philipp Soldan	Modern	Frankenberg	1 Michelin star	1 Michelin star	1 Michelin star	1 Michelin star
OX	Modern	Darmstadt	1 Michelin star	1 Michelin star	1 Michelin star	1 Michelin star
Rausch	Modern	Frankfurt	—	—	—	2 Michelin stars
Restaurant Villa Merton	German	Frankfurt	1 Michelin star	1 Michelin star	1 Michelin star	1 Michelin star
Seven Swans	Vegan	Frankfurt	1 Michelin star	1 Michelin star	1 Michelin star	1 Michelin star
Sommerfeld	Creative	Frankfurt	—	—	1 Michelin star	1 Michelin star
The Dune	International	Frankfurt	—	—	—	2 Michelin stars
Weinschänke Schloss Groenesteyn	German	Kiedrich	1 Michelin star	—	Closed	
Weinsinn	French	Frankfurt	1 Michelin star	Closed		
Reference						

== Lower Saxony ==
As of 2026, there are 11 restaurants with a Michelin-star rating in the state of Lower Saxony.

Key
1 Michelin star	One Michelin star
2 Michelin stars	Two Michelin stars
3 Michelin stars	Three Michelin stars
—	The restaurant did not receive a star that year
Closed	The restaurant is no longer open

Michelin-starred restaurants
Name	Cuisine	Location	2023	2024	2025	2026
Apicius	French	Bad Zwischenahn	1 Michelin star	1 Michelin star	Closed	
Aqua	Modern	Wolfsburg	3 Michelin stars	3 Michelin stars	3 Michelin stars	Closed
Friedrich	French	Osnabrück	1 Michelin star	1 Michelin star	1 Michelin star	Closed
Handwerk	Modern	Hanover	1 Michelin star	1 Michelin star	1 Michelin star	1 Michelin star
Harzfenster	Creative	Seesen	—	—	—	1 Michelin star
Hilmar	Modern	Hanover	—	1 Michelin star	1 Michelin star	Closed
IKO	Modern	Osnabrück	1 Michelin star	1 Michelin star	1 Michelin star	1 Michelin star
Jante	Modern	Hanover	2 Michelin stars	2 Michelin stars	2 Michelin stars	2 Michelin stars
Joseph's Fine Dining	Creative	Bad Sachsa	—	—	1 Michelin star	1 Michelin star
Kesselhaus	Modern	Osnabrück	1 Michelin star	1 Michelin star	1 Michelin star	1 Michelin star
Marie	French	Hanover	—	—	1 Michelin star	1 Michelin star
Mohn	German	Hohnhorst	—	—	—	1 Michelin star
Seesteg	Modern	Norderney	1 Michelin star	1 Michelin star	1 Michelin star	1 Michelin star
Sterneck	Creative	Cuxhaven	1 Michelin star	1 Michelin star	1 Michelin star	1 Michelin star
Votum	Modern	Hanover	2 Michelin stars	2 Michelin stars	2 Michelin stars	2 Michelin stars
Reference						

== Mecklenburg-Vorpommern ==
As of 2026, there are 8 restaurants with a Michelin-star rating in the state of Mecklenburg-Vorpommern.

Key
1 Michelin star	One Michelin star
—	The restaurant did not receive a star that year
Closed	The restaurant is no longer open

Michelin-starred restaurants
Name	Cuisine	Location	2023	2024	2025	2026
Alte Schule	Modern	Feldberger Seenlandschaft	1 Michelin star	1 Michelin star	1 Michelin star	1 Michelin star
freustil	Creative	Binz	1 Michelin star	1 Michelin star	1 Michelin star	1 Michelin star
Friedrich Franz	Modern	Bad Doberan	1 Michelin star	1 Michelin star	1 Michelin star	1 Michelin star
Gourmet-Restaurant Der Butt	Creative	Rostock	1 Michelin star	1 Michelin star	1 Michelin star	1 Michelin star
Gourmetrestaurant 1751	German	Schwerin	—	—	—	1 Michelin star
Gutshaus Stolpe	Modern	Stolpe	1 Michelin star	—	—	—
Ich weiß ein Haus am See	French	Krakow am See	1 Michelin star	1 Michelin star	1 Michelin star	1 Michelin star
Kulmeck by Tom Wickboldt	Modern	Heringsdorf	1 Michelin star	1 Michelin star	1 Michelin star	1 Michelin star
Ostseelounge	Modern	Dierhagen	1 Michelin star	—	—	1 Michelin star
The O'ROOM	Creative	Heringsdorf	1 Michelin star	1 Michelin star	1 Michelin star	Closed
Reference						

== North Rhine-Westphalia ==
As of 2026, there are 50 restaurants with a Michelin-star rating in the state of North Rhine-Westphalia.

Key
1 Michelin star	One Michelin star
2 Michelin stars	Two Michelin stars
3 Michelin stars	Three Michelin stars
—	The restaurant did not receive a star that year
Closed	The restaurant is no longer open

Michelin-starred restaurants
Name	Cuisine	Location	2023	2024	2025	2026
1876 Daniel Dal-Ben	Creative	Düsseldorf	1 Michelin star	1 Michelin star	1 Michelin star	1 Michelin star
Agata's	Creative	Düsseldorf	1 Michelin star	1 Michelin star	1 Michelin star	1 Michelin star
Alfredo	Italian	Cologne	1 Michelin star	—	—	—
Anthony's Kitchen	Modern	Meerbusch	1 Michelin star	1 Michelin star	1 Michelin star	1 Michelin star
Astrein	Modern	Cologne	1 Michelin star	—	—	—
Balthasar	French	Paderborn	1 Michelin star	1 Michelin star	1 Michelin star	1 Michelin star
Bembergs Häuschen	German	Euskirchen	1 Michelin star	—	Closed	
Brust oder Keule (BOK)	Creative	Münster	1 Michelin star	1 Michelin star	1 Michelin star	1 Michelin star
Burg Nideggen (Note: Was named Brockel Schlimbach until 2024)	French	Nideggen	1 Michelin star	1 Michelin star	1 Michelin star	—
Chefs Atelier	Creative	Essen	—	—	1 Michelin star	1 Michelin star
Clostermanns Le Gourmet	Modern	Niederkassel	1 Michelin star	1 Michelin star	—	Closed
Coeur D'Artichaut	French	Münster	2 Michelin stars	2 Michelin stars	2 Michelin stars	2 Michelin stars
der Schneider	German	Dortmund	1 Michelin star	Closed		
Dr. Kosch	German	Düsseldorf	1 Michelin star	Closed		
Goldener Anker	French	Dorsten	1 Michelin star	1 Michelin star	1 Michelin star	1 Michelin star
Grammons	Modern	Dortmund	1 Michelin star	Closed		
Gut Lärchenhof	French	Pulheim	1 Michelin star	1 Michelin star	1 Michelin star	1 Michelin star
Halbedel's Gasthaus	French	Bonn	1 Michelin star	1 Michelin star	1 Michelin star	1 Michelin star
Hannappel	Modern	Essen	1 Michelin star	1 Michelin star	1 Michelin star	1 Michelin star
Haus Stemberg	Modern	Velbert	1 Michelin star	1 Michelin star	1 Michelin star	1 Michelin star
Hofstube Deimann	Modern	Schmallenberg	1 Michelin star	1 Michelin star	1 Michelin star	1 Michelin star
Im Schiffchen	German	Düsseldorf	1 Michelin star	1 Michelin star	1 Michelin star	1 Michelin star
Jae	Asian Fusion	Düsseldorf	—	1 Michelin star	1 Michelin star	1 Michelin star
Jan Diekjobst	Modern	Detmold	1 Michelin star	1 Michelin star	—	—
Kettner's Kamota	Austrian	Essen	1 Michelin star	1 Michelin star	1 Michelin star	1 Michelin star
La Bécasse	French	Aachen	1 Michelin star	1 Michelin star	1 Michelin star	1 Michelin star
La Cuisine Rademacher	French	Cologne	1 Michelin star	1 Michelin star	1 Michelin star	1 Michelin star
La Société	Modern	Cologne	1 Michelin star	1 Michelin star	1 Michelin star	1 Michelin star
la vie	Modern	Düsseldorf	—	—	1 Michelin star	1 Michelin star
Landhaus Köpp	German	Xanten	1 Michelin star	—	—	—
Le Flair	Mediterranean	Düsseldorf	1 Michelin star	1 Michelin star	—	Closed
Le Moissonnier Bistro	French	Cologne	2 Michelin stars	1 Michelin star	1 Michelin star	1 Michelin star
maiBeck	German	Cologne	1 Michelin star	1 Michelin star	—	—
maximilian lorenz	Modern	Cologne	1 Michelin star	1 Michelin star	1 Michelin star	1 Michelin star
Mod by Sven Nöthel	German	Duisburg	1 Michelin star	1 Michelin star	1 Michelin star	1 Michelin star
Mühlenhelle	French	Gummersbach	1 Michelin star	1 Michelin star	1 Michelin star	1 Michelin star
Nagaya	Japanese	Düsseldorf	1 Michelin star	1 Michelin star	1 Michelin star	1 Michelin star
NeoBiota	Modern	Cologne	1 Michelin star	1 Michelin star	—	1 Michelin star
Ox & Klee	Modern	Cologne	2 Michelin stars	2 Michelin stars	2 Michelin stars	2 Michelin stars
Phoenix	Creative	Düsseldorf	1 Michelin star	Closed		
Pink Pepper	Modern	Düsseldorf	1 Michelin star	Closed		
Porte Neuf	French	Detmold	—	—	—	1 Michelin star
Pottkind	Creative	Cologne	1 Michelin star	1 Michelin star	1 Michelin star	1 Michelin star
Ratsstuben	Modern	Haltern am See	1 Michelin star	1 Michelin star	1 Michelin star	1 Michelin star
Reuter	French	Rheda-Wiedenbrück	1 Michelin star	1 Michelin star	1 Michelin star	1 Michelin star
Rosin	German	Dorsten	1 Michelin star	1 Michelin star	1 Michelin star	1 Michelin star
Sahila	International	Cologne	1 Michelin star	1 Michelin star	1 Michelin star	1 Michelin star
Sankt Benedict	French	Aachen	1 Michelin star	1 Michelin star	1 Michelin star	1 Michelin star
Schloss Loersfeld	French	Kerpen	1 Michelin star	—	—	—
Schote	German	Essen	1 Michelin star	—	—	1 Michelin star
SchwarzGold	German	Dortmund	—	—	1 Michelin star	1 Michelin star
Setzkasten	Modern	Düsseldorf	—	—	1 Michelin star	1 Michelin star
Shiraz	Syrian	Wuppertal	1 Michelin star	1 Michelin star	1 Michelin star	1 Michelin star
Spitzner	French	Münster	1 Michelin star	1 Michelin star	1 Michelin star	1 Michelin star
Taku	Asian Fusion	Cologne	1 Michelin star	1 Michelin star	1 Michelin star	1 Michelin star
Tante Anna	Japanese	Sprockhövel	—	—	—	1 Michelin star
Teko	Bolivian	Essen	—	—	—	1 Michelin star
The Stage	Modern	Dortmund	1 Michelin star	1 Michelin star	1 Michelin star	Closed
Theodor's	German	Bonn	—	—	—	1 Michelin star
Troyka	Russian	Erkelenz	1 Michelin star	1 Michelin star	1 Michelin star	1 Michelin star
Vendôme	French	Bergisch Gladbach	2 Michelin stars	2 Michelin stars	2 Michelin stars	2 Michelin stars
Yoshi by Nagaya	Japanese	Düsseldorf	1 Michelin star	1 Michelin star	1 Michelin star	1 Michelin star
Yunico	Japanese	Bonn	1 Michelin star	1 Michelin star	1 Michelin star	1 Michelin star
Zur Post	Modern	Odenthal	1 Michelin star	1 Michelin star	1 Michelin star	1 Michelin star
Zur Tant	German	Cologne	1 Michelin star	1 Michelin star	1 Michelin star	1 Michelin star
Zwanzig23	Creative	Düsseldorf	—	1 Michelin star	1 Michelin star	1 Michelin star
Reference						

== Rhineland-Palatinate ==
As of 2026, there are 27 restaurants with a Michelin-star rating in the state of Rhineland-Palatinate.

Key
1 Michelin star	One Michelin star
2 Michelin stars	Two Michelin stars
3 Michelin stars	Three Michelin stars
—	The restaurant did not receive a star that year
Closed	The restaurant is no longer open

Michelin-starred restaurants
Name	Cuisine	Location	2023	2024	2025	2026
Admiral	Contemporary	Weisenheim am Berg	1 Michelin star	1 Michelin star	1 Michelin star	1 Michelin star
Alte Pfarrey	French	Neuleiningen	1 Michelin star	Closed		
Bagatelle	French	Trier	1 Michelin star	1 Michelin star	1 Michelin star	1 Michelin star
Borst	French	Maßweiler	1 Michelin star	1 Michelin star	1 Michelin star	1 Michelin star
Die Brasserie	German	Pirmasens	1 Michelin star	1 Michelin star	1 Michelin star	1 Michelin star
Dopamin	Nordic	Saarburg	—	—	—	1 Michelin star
FAVORITE restaurant	French	Mainz	1 Michelin star	1 Michelin star	1 Michelin star	1 Michelin star
Gotthardt's	Modern	Koblenz	1 Michelin star	—	2 Michelin stars	2 Michelin stars
Intense	Fusion	Wachenheim	1 Michelin star	1 Michelin star	2 Michelin stars	2 Michelin stars
irori	Japanese	Knittelsheim	—	—	1 Michelin star	1 Michelin star
Jungborn	Modern	Bad Sobernheim	1 Michelin star	1 Michelin star	1 Michelin star	Closed
Kaupers Restaurant	Modern	Selzen	1 Michelin star	1 Michelin star	1 Michelin star	1 Michelin star
Kucher's Gourmet	German	Darscheid	1 Michelin star	1 Michelin star	1 Michelin star	1 Michelin star
L.A. Jordan	Modern	Deidesheim	2 Michelin stars	2 Michelin stars	2 Michelin stars	3 Michelin stars
Le temple	French	Neuhütten	1 Michelin star	1 Michelin star	1 Michelin star	1 Michelin star
Meisenheimer Hof	German	Meisenheim	—	1 Michelin star	1 Michelin star	1 Michelin star
Purs	Fusion	Andernach	2 Michelin stars	—	1 Michelin star	1 Michelin star
Restaurant Brogsitter	Modern	Bad Neuenahr-Ahrweiler	—	1 Michelin star	1 Michelin star	1 Michelin star
Rüssel's Landhaus	Creative	Naurath (Wald)	1 Michelin star	1 Michelin star	1 Michelin star	1 Michelin star
schanz.	French	Piesport	3 Michelin stars	3 Michelin stars	3 Michelin stars	3 Michelin stars
Schiller's Manufaktur	German	Koblenz	1 Michelin star	1 Michelin star	1 Michelin star	1 Michelin star
Schwarz Gourmet	French	Kirchheim	1 Michelin star	1 Michelin star	1 Michelin star	1 Michelin star
Schwarzer Hahn	French	Deidesheim	1 Michelin star	1 Michelin star	1 Michelin star	1 Michelin star
St. Laurentiushof	Modern	Birkweiler	—	1 Michelin star	1 Michelin star	1 Michelin star
Steinheuers	French	Bad Neuenahr-Ahrweiler	2 Michelin stars	2 Michelin stars	2 Michelin stars	2 Michelin stars
Steins Traube	German	Mainz	1 Michelin star	1 Michelin star	1 Michelin star	1 Michelin star
Urgestein	Creative	Neustadt	1 Michelin star	Closed		
Verbene	Modern	Koblenz	1 Michelin star	1 Michelin star	1 Michelin star	1 Michelin star
Waldhotel Sonnora	French	Dreis	3 Michelin stars	3 Michelin stars	3 Michelin stars	3 Michelin stars
Wein- und Tafelhaus	Mediterranean	Trittenheim	1 Michelin star	1 Michelin star	1 Michelin star	1 Michelin star
Reference						

== Saarland ==
As of 2026, there are 8 restaurants with a Michelin-star rating in the state of Saxony.

Key
1 Michelin star	One Michelin star
2 Michelin stars	Two Michelin stars
3 Michelin stars	Three Michelin stars
—	The restaurant did not receive a star that year

Michelin-starred restaurants
Name	Cuisine	Location	2023	2024	2025	2026
ATAMA by Martin Stopp	Creative	Sankt Ingbert	—	—	2 Michelin stars	2 Michelin stars
Esplanade	German	Saarbrücken	2 Michelin stars	2 Michelin stars	2 Michelin stars	2 Michelin stars
GästeHaus Klaus Erfort	French	Saarbrücken	2 Michelin stars	2 Michelin stars	2 Michelin stars	2 Michelin stars
Hämmerle's Restaurant	French	Blieskastel	1 Michelin star	1 Michelin star	1 Michelin star	1 Michelin star
LOUIS restaurant	French	Saarlouis	2 Michelin stars	2 Michelin stars	2 Michelin stars	2 Michelin stars
Midi	German	Sankt Ingbert	—	1 Michelin star	1 Michelin star	1 Michelin star
Restaurant Kunz	French	Sankt Wendel	1 Michelin star	1 Michelin star	1 Michelin star	1 Michelin star
Victor's Fine Dining	Creative	Perl	3 Michelin stars	3 Michelin stars	3 Michelin stars	3 Michelin stars
Reference						

== Saxony ==
As of 2026, there are 8 restaurants with a Michelin-star rating in the state of Saxony.

Key
1 Michelin star	One Michelin star
2 Michelin stars	Two Michelin stars
—	The restaurant did not receive a star that year
Closed	The restaurant is no longer open

Michelin-starred restaurants
Name	Cuisine	Location	2023	2024	2025	2026
Atelier Sanssouci	Mediterranean	Radebeul	1 Michelin star	1 Michelin star	1 Michelin star	1 Michelin star
elements	Modern	Dresden	1 Michelin star	1 Michelin star	1 Michelin star	1 Michelin star
Falco	Modern	Leipzig	2 Michelin stars	Closed		
Frieda	Creative	Leipzig	1 Michelin star	1 Michelin star	1 Michelin star	1 Michelin star
Genuss-Atelier	Contemporary	Dresden	1 Michelin star	1 Michelin star	1 Michelin star	1 Michelin star
Heiderand	Modern	Dresden	—	—	1 Michelin star	1 Michelin star
JUWEL	French	Schirgiswalde-Kirschau	1 Michelin star	1 Michelin star	1 Michelin star	—
Kuultivo	Creative	Leipzig	1 Michelin star	1 Michelin star	1 Michelin star	1 Michelin star
St. Andreas	Modern	Aue-Bad Schlema	—	1 Michelin star	1 Michelin star	1 Michelin star
Stadtpfeiffer	French	Leipzig	1 Michelin star	1 Michelin star	1 Michelin star	1 Michelin star
Reference						

== Saxony-Anhalt ==
As of 2026, there are 3 restaurants with a Michelin-star rating in the state of Saxony-Anhalt.

Key
1 Michelin star	One Michelin star
2 Michelin stars	Two Michelin stars

Michelin-starred restaurants
Name	Cuisine	Location	2023	2024	2025	2026
Pietsch	Asian Fusion	Wernigerode	1 Michelin star	1 Michelin star	2 Michelin stars	2 Michelin stars
Speiseberg	Modern	Halle (Saale)	1 Michelin star	1 Michelin star	1 Michelin star	1 Michelin star
Zeitwerk	Creative	Wernigerode	1 Michelin star	1 Michelin star	1 Michelin star	1 Michelin star
Reference						

== Schleswig-Holstein ==
As of 2026, there are 11 restaurants with a Michelin-star rating in the state of Schleswig-Holstein.

Key
1 Michelin star	One Michelin star
2 Michelin stars	Two Michelin stars
—	The restaurant did not receive a star that year
Closed	The restaurant is no longer open

Michelin-starred restaurants
Name	Cuisine	Location	2023	2024	2025	2026
1797	German	Panker	1 Michelin star	Closed		
Ahlmanns	Creative	Kiel	—	—	1 Michelin star	1 Michelin star
Alt Wyk	German	Wyk	1 Michelin star	1 Michelin star	1 Michelin star	1 Michelin star
Bodendorf's	French	Tinnum	1 Michelin star	1 Michelin star	1 Michelin star	1 Michelin star
Courtier	German	Weissenhaus	2 Michelin stars	2 Michelin stars	2 Michelin stars	Closed
Das Grace	Modern	Flensburg	1 Michelin star	1 Michelin star	1 Michelin star	1 Michelin star
DiVa	French	Scharbeutz	1 Michelin star	1 Michelin star	1 Michelin star	1 Michelin star
KAI3	Modern	Hörnum	1 Michelin star	1 Michelin star	1 Michelin star	1 Michelin star
Meierei Dirk Luther	German	Glücksburg	2 Michelin stars	2 Michelin stars	2 Michelin stars	2 Michelin stars
Orangerie	French	Timmendorfer Strand	1 Michelin star	1 Michelin star	1 Michelin star	1 Michelin star
Söl'ring Hof	Modern	Rantum	2 Michelin stars	2 Michelin stars	2 Michelin stars	2 Michelin stars
Tipken's by Nils Henkel	Modern	Keitum	—	1 Michelin star	1 Michelin star	1 Michelin star
Wullenwever	Mediterranean	Lübeck	1 Michelin star	1 Michelin star	1 Michelin star	1 Michelin star
Reference						

== Thuringia ==
As of 2026, there are 4 restaurants with a Michelin-star rating in the state of Thuringia.

Key
1 Michelin star	One Michelin star
—	The restaurant did not receive a star that year

Michelin-starred restaurants
Name	Cuisine	Location	2023	2024	2025	2026
BjörnsOx	Creative	Dermbach	1 Michelin star	1 Michelin star	1 Michelin star	1 Michelin star
Clara	Modern	Erfurt	1 Michelin star	1 Michelin star	1 Michelin star	1 Michelin star
Masters	French	Blankenhain	1 Michelin star	1 Michelin star	1 Michelin star	1 Michelin star
The First	Italian	Blankenhain	—	1 Michelin star	1 Michelin star	1 Michelin star
Reference						

== See also ==
- List of restaurants in Germany
