= Bratwurst-Röslein =

Restaurant in Nuremberg, Germany

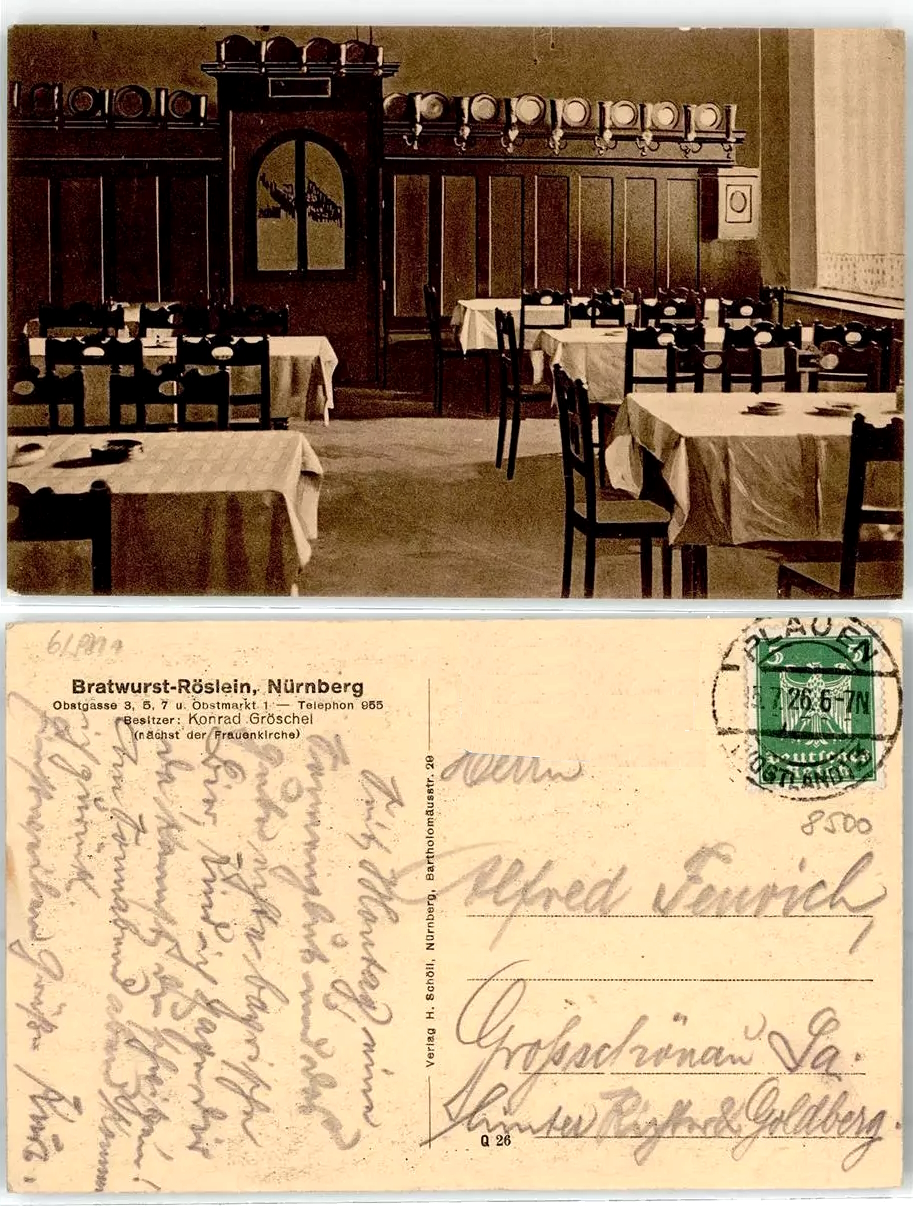
- Postcard with a photo of Bratwurst-Röslein in 1926
- Industry: Restaurant
- Founded: 1431
- Headquarters: Rathausplatz 6, 90402 Nürnberg, Germany
- Website: www.bratwurst-roeslein.de

Bratwurst-Röslein is a traditional restaurant in Nuremberg, Germany founded in 1431. The restaurant, which claims to be the largest sausage restaurant in the world, is located in the old town at the Nuremberg Christkindlesmarkt.

== See also ==
- List of oldest companies
