= Regensburg Museum of Danube Shipping =

Museum in Germany

Coordinates: 49°01′15″N 12°06′02″E

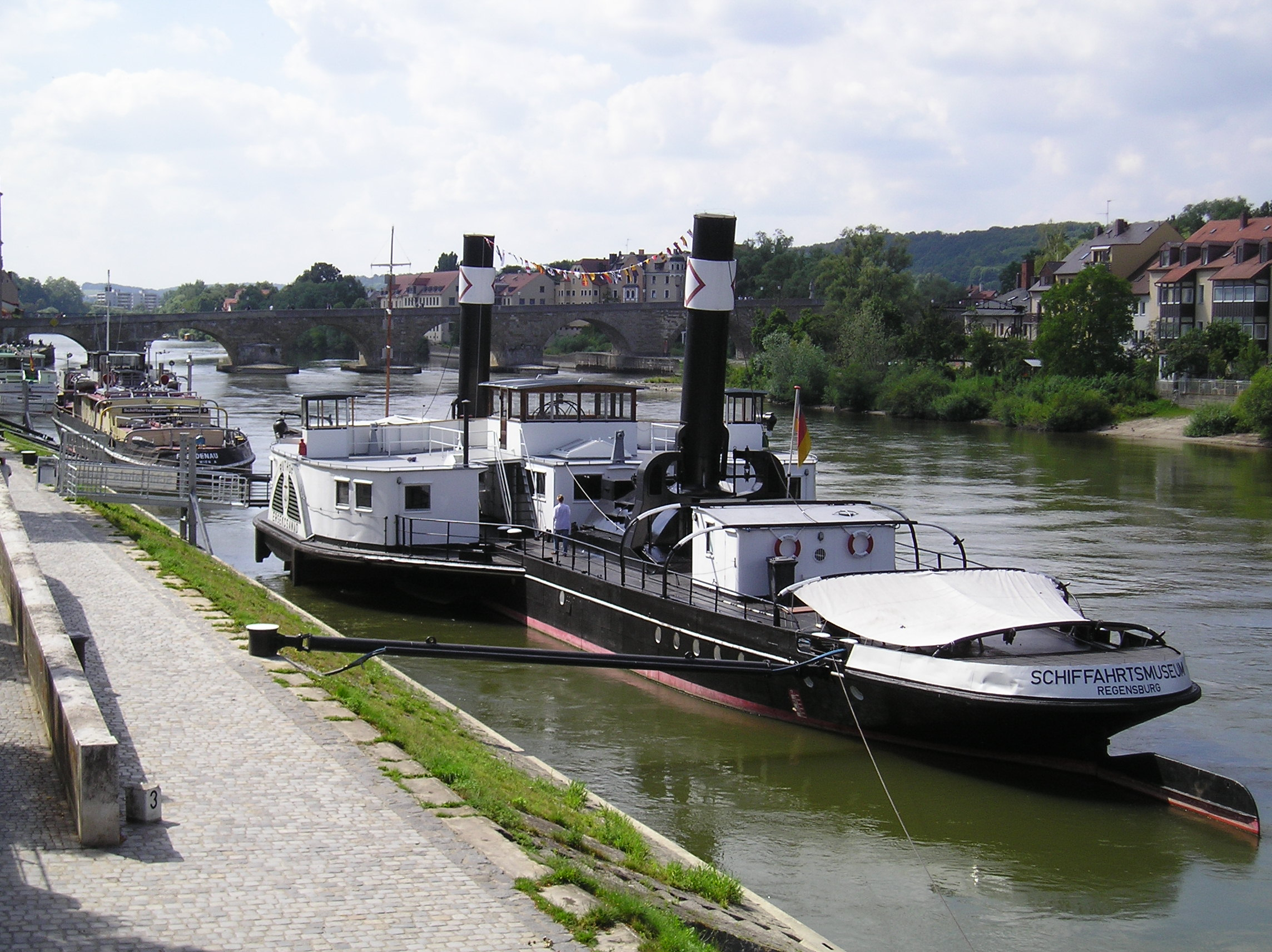
The Ruthof / Érsekcsanád (foreground) and the Freudenau (background).

The Regensburg Museum of Danube Shipping (Donau-Schiffahrts-Museum Regensburg) is a maritime museum of shipping on the river Danube and other rivers, situated in the city of Regensburg in Germany. It also contains art collections on that topic, along with material on boatmen's work and training. Its main exhibits are the steam tugboat Ruthof / Érsekcsanád and the diesel tug Freudenau.

== History ==
Although there were earlier approaches to founding a shipping museum in Regensburg, the club Arbeitskreis Schiffahrts-Museum Regensburg e. V. was founded 19th of January 1979 in response to the threatened scrapping of the Hungarian steam boat Érsekcsanád, constructed in Regensburg in 1923 under the name Ruthof. After overcoming numerous difficulties, the club purchased from the Hungarian shipping company Mahart on August 21., 1979 for 40.000DM. In October, the ship was brought to Deggendorf for conservation before arriving in Regensburg on November 4, 1980. After the ship was suitably set up, the museum's opening ceremony took place on the 10th of May, 1983. However, the interior was only completed in 1984.

In the bow cabin of the Ruthof/Érsekcsanád, the development of shipping on the Danube is explained via numerous signs and models. However, the most important exhibit is the ship itself. The oil bunker, boiler room, and machine room as well as the technical furnishing on deck, the bridge, the ship's kitchen, and the crew's accommodation can be viewed. This allows for a complete insight of work and living conditions on a ship of this kind.

In 1987, the accompaniment of the former shipping passage at Steinerne Brueke was transferred to the club.

In 1995, the club purchased the former motorized tugboat Freudenau. Built in 1941 in Linz, it was already equipped with diesel propulsion. In contrast to Ruthof / Érsekcsanád, on which some changes in construction had to be carried out to house the museum rooms, Freudenau was presented practically in the same state as at its decommission in 1993.

The museum was originally located on Werftstraße am Unteren Wöhrd. In 2004, it was relocated to a more central location. Since then, the berth of the Ruthof / Érsekcsanád and the Freudenau is located at the southern (right) shore between the Iron Bridge and the Stone Bridge (Marc-Aurel-Ufer, Thundorferstraße).

A portion is locatated in Brückturm, part of Salzstadel.
