= Historische Wurstkuchl =

Restaurant in Regensburg, Germany

Coordinates: 49°01′16″N 12°05′51″E

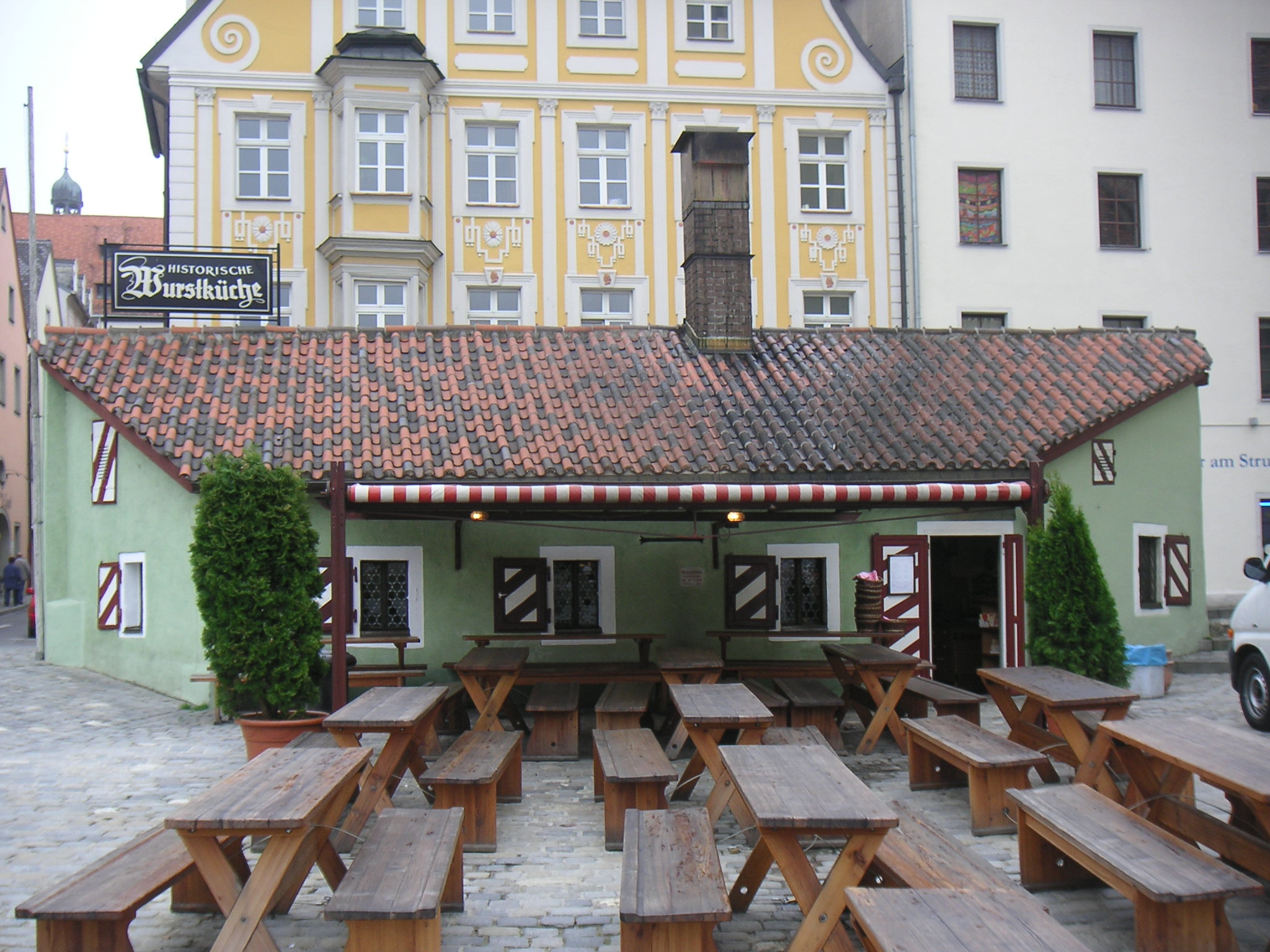
Historische Wurstküche

Historische Wurstkuchl (German for 'historic sausage kitchen') is a restaurant in Regensburg, Germany. This is notable as perhaps the oldest continuously open public restaurant in the world. In 1135 AD a building was erected as the construction office for the Regensburg stone bridge. When the bridge was finished in 1146 AD, the building became a restaurant named "Garkueche auf dem Kranchen" ('cookshop near the crane') as it was situated near the then river port. Dockers, sailors and the staff of the nearby St. Peter cathedral workshop were the regulars for the centuries to come. The present building at this location dates from the 17th century, but archaeological evidence has confirmed the existence of a previous building from the 12th century with about the same dimensions.

Until ca. AD 1800, the specialty was 'gesottenes Fleisch' (boiled meat), but when the family who currently own the restaurant took over in 1806, charcoal grilled sausages were introduced as the main dish offered.

The kitchen still operates today (daily 8AM–7PM, except holidays) and serves 6,000 sausages to guests daily. Sausages are the main dish on the menu and come in portions of six, eight or ten, along with sauerkraut and mustard. Renowned Bavarian dishes such as Franconian "Saure Zipfel", "Krautwickerl" and "Sauerbraten", as well as a variety of salads etc., are available.

During the summer tourism season, most of the guests are served outside on wooden benches/tables, as the tiny building barely seats 35 inside.
