= Frasdorf =

- Municipality
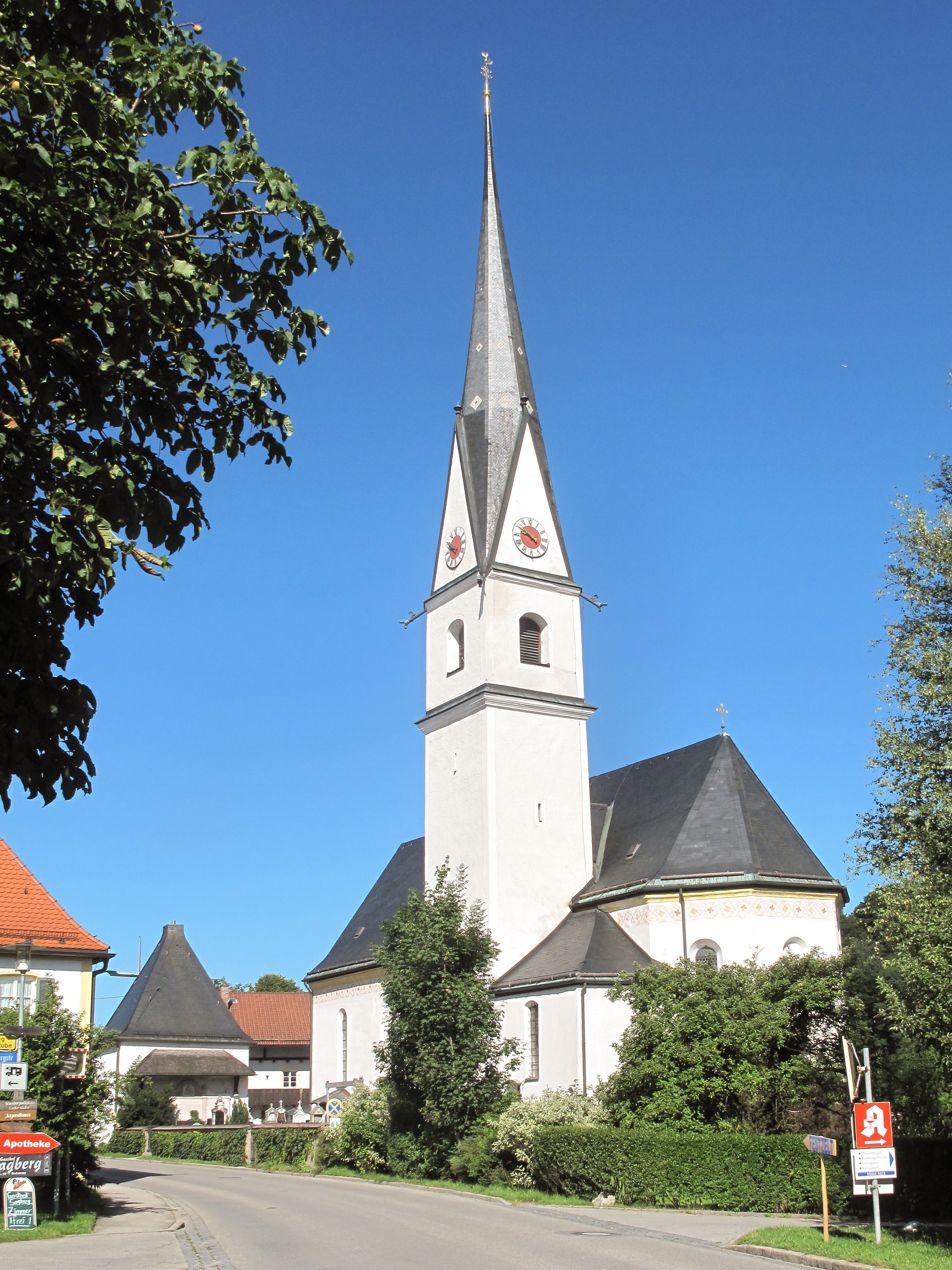
- Church of Saint Margaret

- Coat of arms

- Location of Frasdorf within Rosenheim district
- Interactive map of Frasdorf
- Location within Germany Location within Bavaria
- Coordinates: 47°48′N 12°17′E
- Country: Germany
- State: Bavaria
- Admin. region: Oberbayern
- District: Rosenheim

Government
  - Mayor (2020–26): Daniel Mair (CSU)

Area
  - Total: 32.72 km^{2} (12.63 sq mi)
- Elevation: 598 m (1,962 ft)

Population (2025-12-31)
  - Total: 2,942
  - Density: 89.91/km^{2} (232.9/sq mi)
- Time zone: UTC+01:00 (CET)
  - Summer (DST): UTC+02:00 (CEST)
- Postal codes: 83112
- Dialling codes: 08052
- Vehicle registration: RO
- Website: www.frasdorf.de

Frasdorf is a municipality in the district of Rosenheim in Bavaria in Germany.
