= Tantris =

Coordinates: 48°10′11.14″N 11°35′17.93″E

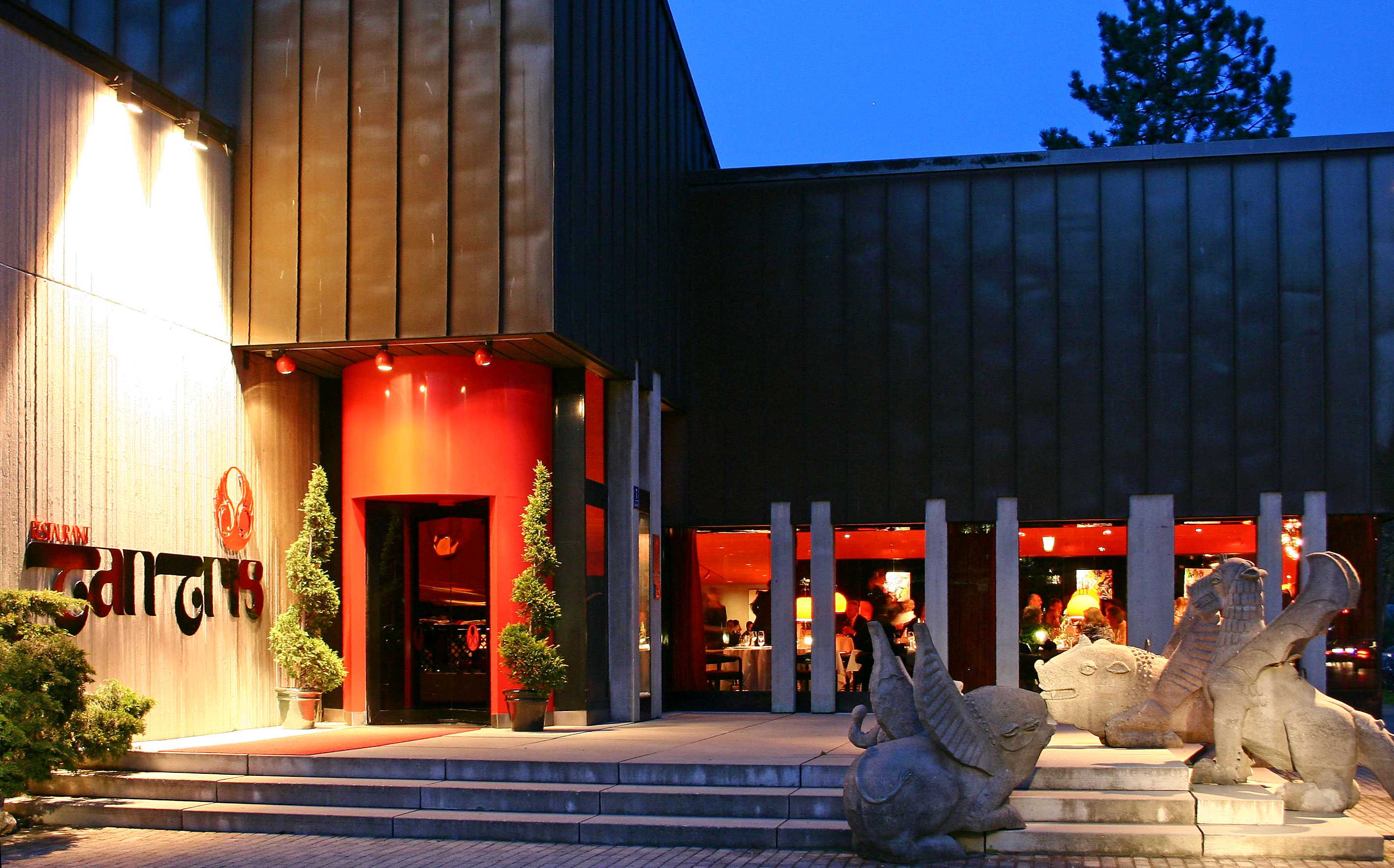
- Interactive map of Tantris

Restaurant information
- Established: 1971
- Head chef: Benjamin Chmura
- Chef: Eckart Witzigmann, Heinz Winkler, Hans Haas
- Location: Munich, Germany

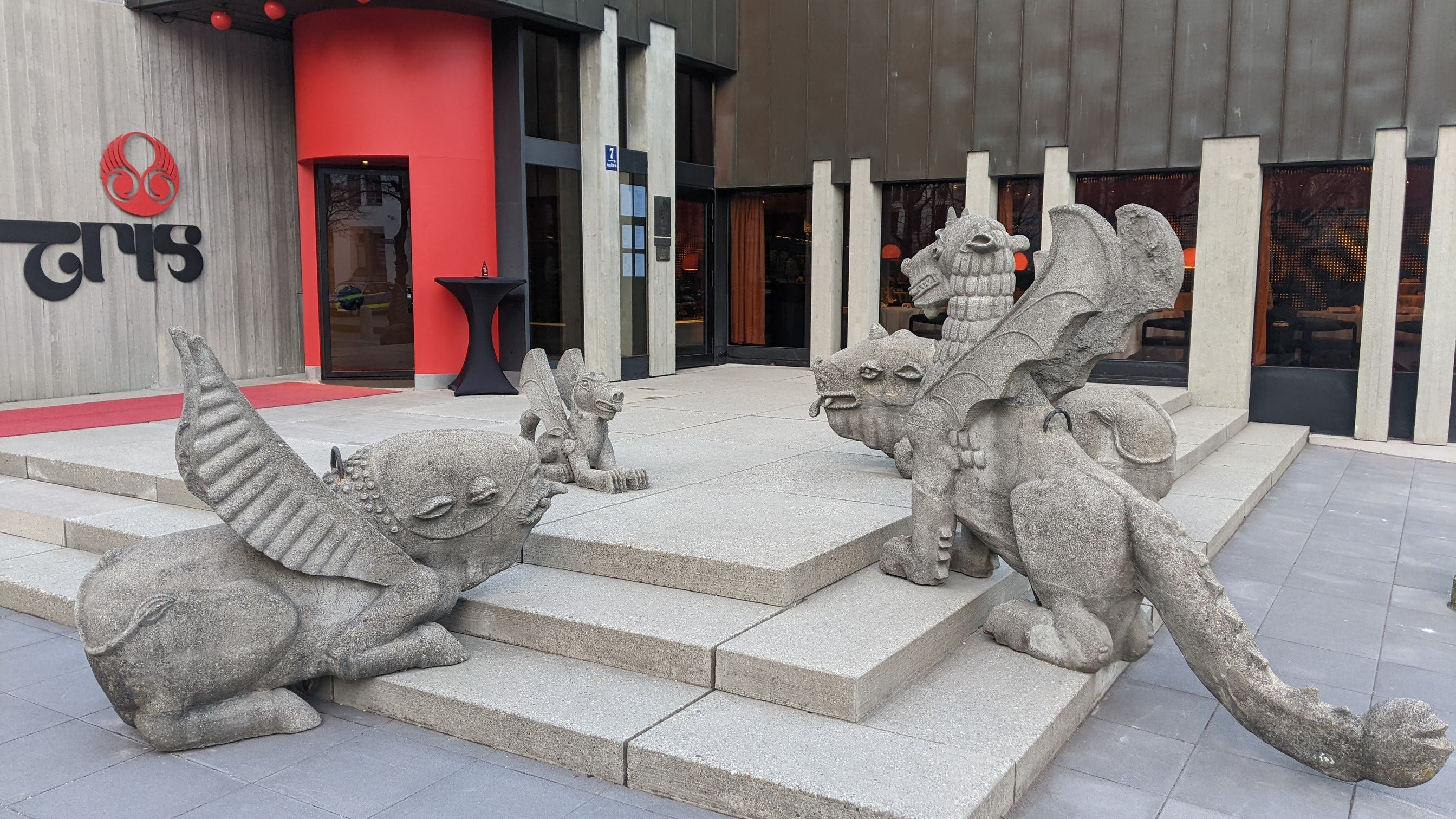
Sculptures at the entrance made by Bruno Weber

Tantris is a restaurant in Munich, Germany. Opened in 1971, it is regarded as one of the best restaurants in Germany. It was ranked as 44th best in the world in Restaurant magazines's Top 50 of 2009.

Chefs have included Eckart Witzigmann and Heinz Winkler. From 1991 to 2020, the chef was Hans Haas. Since then, Benjamin Chmura has led the kitchen.

== See also ==
- List of Michelin-starred restaurants in Germany
