= Ballhaus Watzke =

Coordinates: 51.077481°N 13.715701°E

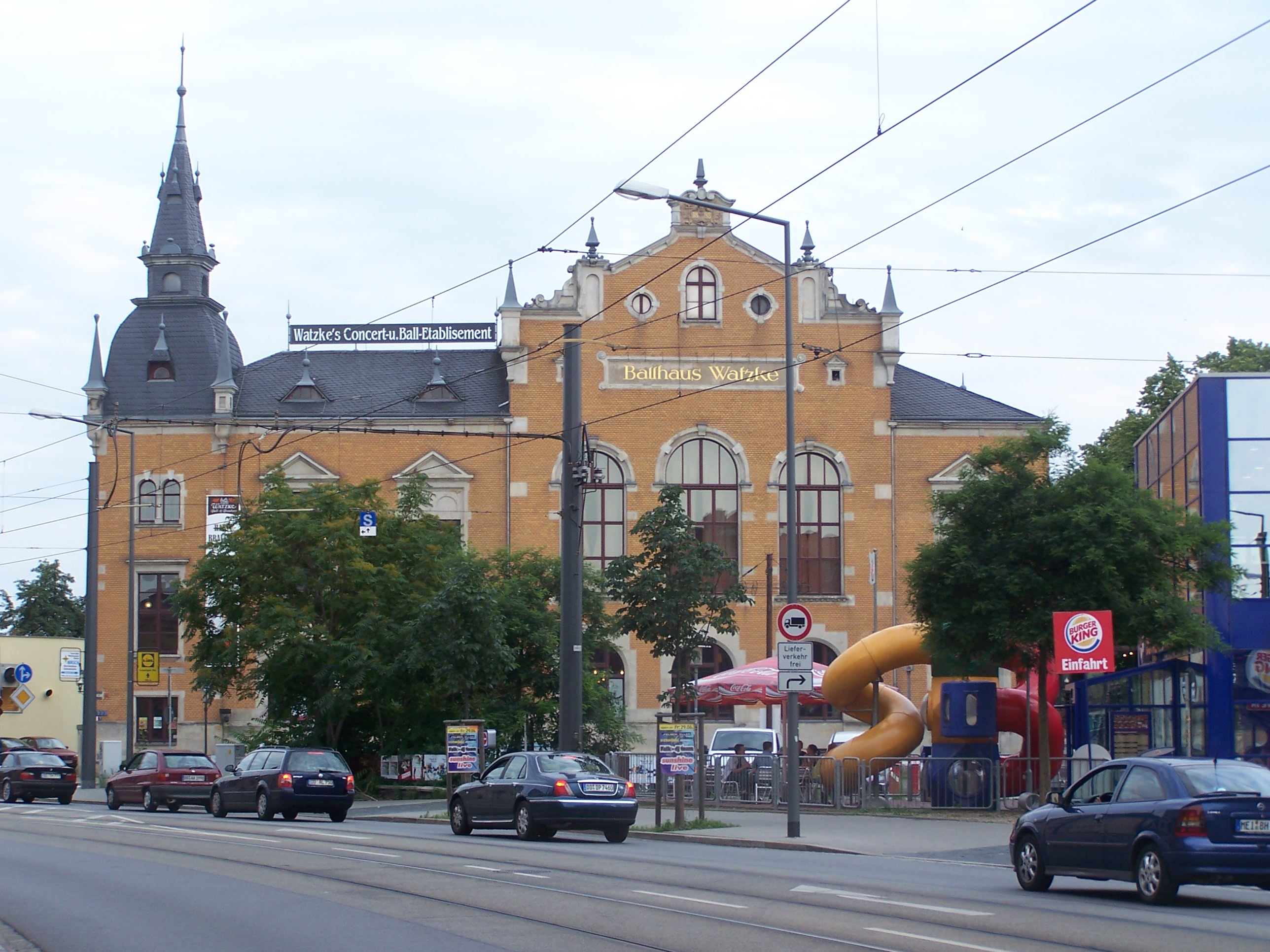
The Ballhaus Watzke, seen from Leipziger Straße

Ballhaus Watzke (self-designation: Ball- & Brauhaus Watzke) is a late 19th-century restaurant with a ballroom on the upper floor and an in-house brewery under monument protection. The restaurant is located in Dresden at the corner Leipziger Straße and Kötzschenbroderstraße in the district Mickten (Ortsamt Pieschen)

== History ==
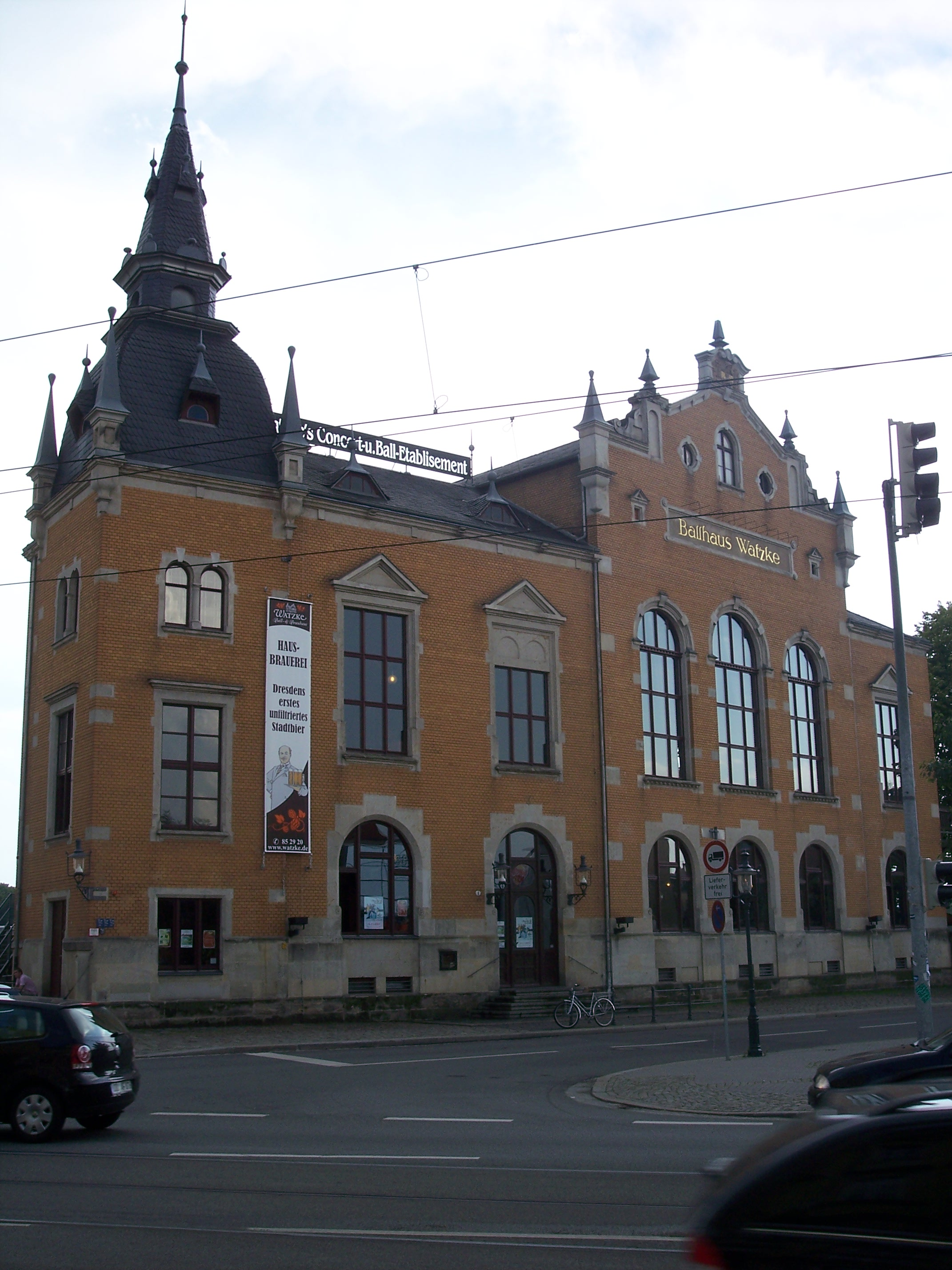
Ballhaus Watzke, seen from Leipziger Straße

Around 1790, in the village of Pieschen near Dresden, the first building outside the village core was a peasant shed, which was jacked up and enlarged in 1804. In this house the housekeeper Gottlob Dietzen ran a spirits distillery. Dietzen, however, received no license and was thus to blame for the fact that his house had to be auctioned for 855 thalers. The buyer was the brewer, Gottlob Wilhelm Hübner. In 1814, he received the Schankerlaubnis for "Branntwein, Dresden Stadtbier und Wein" and set up a restaurant.

On July 27, 1838, the spirits burner Karl Joseph Watzke acquired the catering business, including the Schank concession. He gave her the name Watzke's garden restaurant with Elbterrasse. The restaurant remained family-owned and was expanded several times. In 1898, a year after Pieschen had been incorporated into Dresden, the old economy was demolished and a ball-house with a large ball hall was built by Gustav Paul Watzke (the grandson of the first Watzke host) First floor. It stands on the Kötzschenbroder Straße 1, which is located in the neighborhood of the village center Altpieschen, but already belongs to Mickten. The house in Neo-Empire style was given the name Watzke's Concert- and Balletablissement. The architect was Benno Hübel; the ceiling painting in the hall was by Emil Schulz. With 770 seats, the building had one of the largest halls in the city of Dresden. After Paul Watzke was drafted into the military in 1914, the house served as a temporary shelter.

After the death of Paul Watzke in 1937, his wife Alma took over the operation of the economy. However, this had to be stopped again with the outbreak of war, the rooms again served as a shelter for soldiers. Since the area at the Pieschener Winkel had been spared much of the destruction of the war, in the summer of 1945 numerous Dresdeners again moved into the newly opened Watzke restaurant. Immediately after the Allied Bombings, Alma Watzke heroically allowed many hundreds of bombing survivors to shelter and sleep in the building. In the ball room on the upper floor was also offered a daily Varieté program. Only five years later, the restaurant had to close again because it could not withstand the competition with government subsidized HO restaurants. Until 1993, the house was only used as a warehouse for HO sports articles.

After a renovation in the years 1993 to 1996, the Ballhaus Watzke was reopened by Rudi Vogel from Karlsruhe. There are various guest rooms, a brewery on the ground floor and the ballroom on the upper floor. During the century flood in Saxony in August 2002, the ball house was damaged and had to close temporarily but was able to open again after six months. The guest house also has a beer garden right on the banks of the river Elbe, from where you have a view of Dresden's old town.

== Brauhaus ==
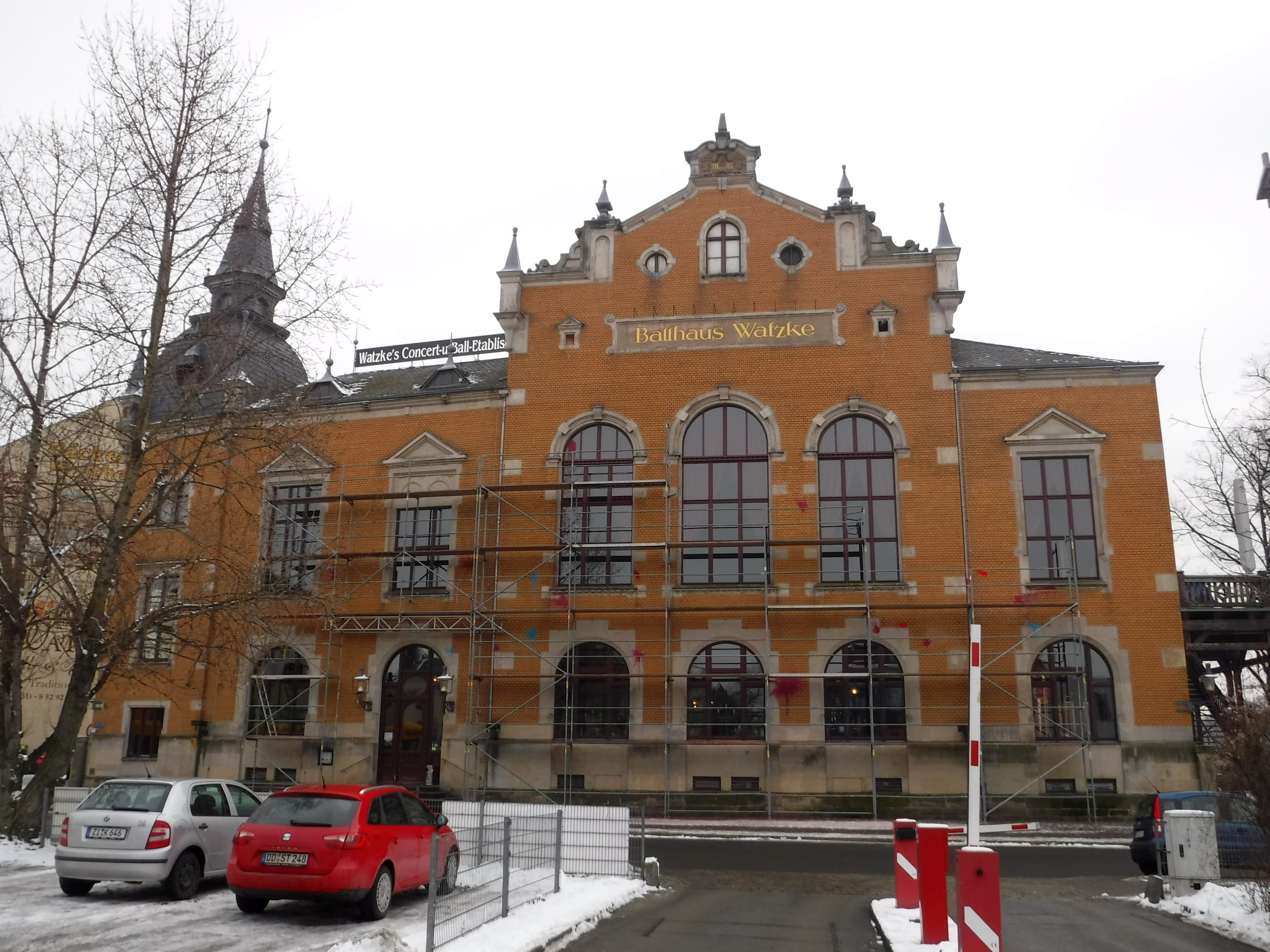

In addition to the parent house in Mickten, the Hausbräu in the Ballhaus Watzke GmbH still operates a brewery on the main street in Dresden's Innere Neustadt and since April 2012 on the Dr.-Külz-Ring in the old town.

The Ballhaus Watzke competes with its own Brauhaus at the Waldschlösschen in the Radeberger Vorstadt, which for itself is the "Dresden's most beautiful Brauhaus".

On January 17, 2017, in the Ballhaus Watzke Schauplatz there was a speech by the AfD- politician Björn Höcke, who was responsible for the nationwide visit. Criticism was also directed against the ball house. The managing director said that he had only been informed of Höcke's appearance at short notice. One deeply regrets "the exploitation" of the house and the "lack of prior checking". Previously, the Ballhaus had made its premises available to right-wing conservative groups.
