= Bratwursthäusle Nürnberg =

Oldest restaurant in Nuremberg, Germany

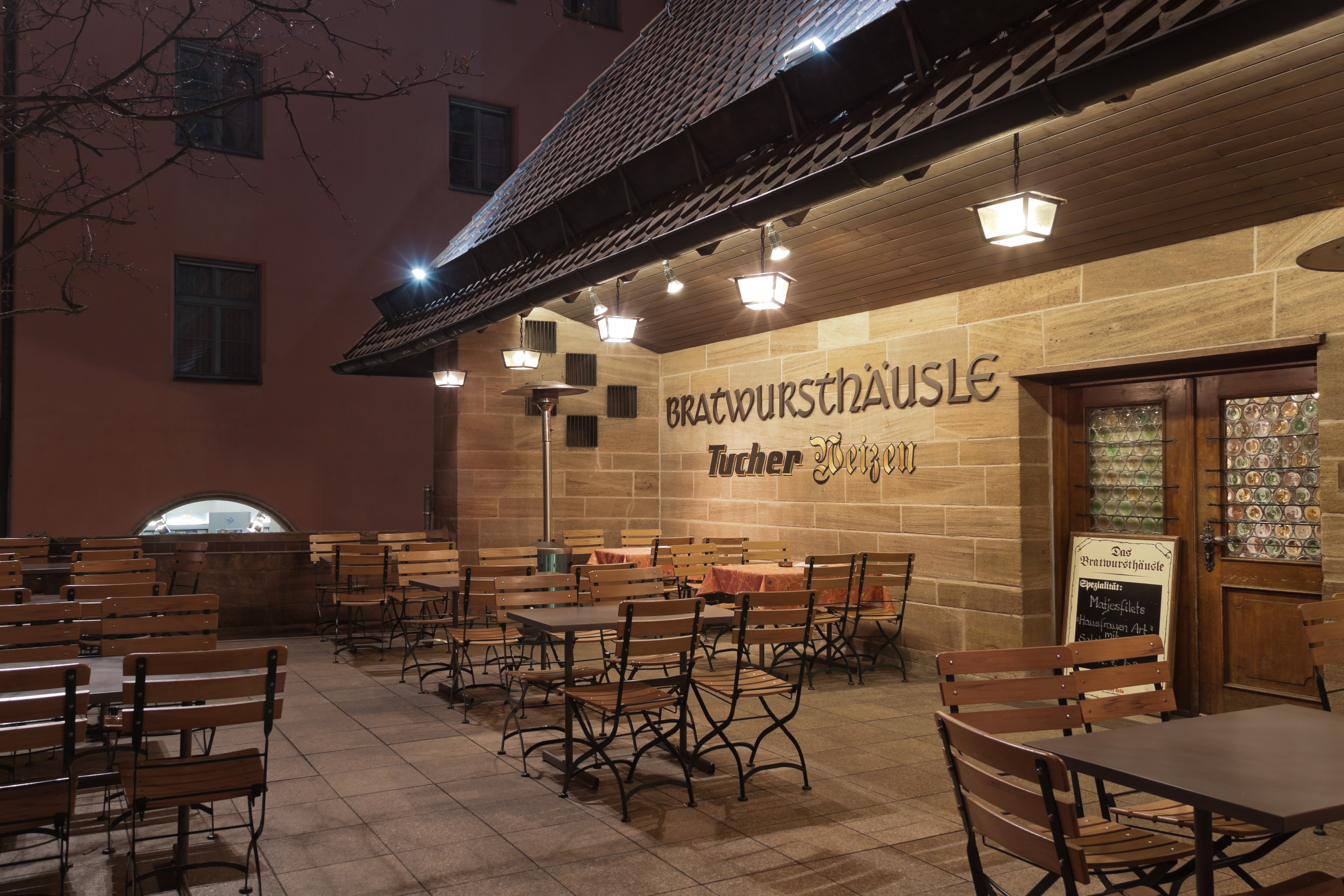
- Restaurant night view
- Native name: Werner Behringer GmbH
- Industry: Restaurant
- Founded: 1312
- Headquarters: Rathausplatz 1, 90403 Nuremberg, Bavaria, Germany
- Website: bratwursthaeuslenuernberg.de/en/

Bratwursthäusle Nürnberg is the oldest restaurant in Nuremberg, Bavaria state, Germany. It was founded in 1312 and is located in the city historic center. The restaurant is famous for producing the original Nuremberg Bratwurst (grilled sausages). The European Union gave the Nuremberg bratwurst the Protected Geographical Indication (PGI) in 2003, as the first sausage in Europe.

== See also ==
- List of oldest companies
