= Vendôme (restaurant) =

Restaurant in Bergisch Gladbach, Germany

Coordinates: 50.9662°N 7.1606°E

- Interactive map of Vendôme

Restaurant information
- Head chef: Joachim Wissler
- Pastry chef: Larissa Metz
- Rating: 2 Michelin stars
- Location: 51429 Kadettenstraße, Bergisch Gladbach, Germany
- Website: althoffcollection.com/de/althoff-grandhotel-schloss-bensberg/restaurant-vendome

Vendôme is a Michelin 2-star restaurant in Bergisch Gladbach, near Cologne, Germany. The restaurant is led by chef de cuisine Joachim Wissler, and is part of the Grandhotel Schloss Bensberg.

Under Wissler, Vendôme received its first Michelin star in 2001, a second in 2002 and finally the third in 2005, an award only given to "exceptional cuisine with distinctive dishes, precisely executed using superlative ingredients, and worth a special journey". Vendôme has consistently been ranked among The World's 50 Best Restaurants since 2008. It was voted 47th best in the world on Restaurant magazine's 2017 list, the highest ranked German restaurant of two on the list, the other being Tim Raue's restaurant currently ranked at number 48.

== See also ==
- List of Michelin 3-star restaurants
