= Bagatelle (disambiguation) =

Bagatelle is a table game and the predecessor of the pinball machine.

Bagatelle may also refer to:

== Music ==
- Bagatelle (band), an Irish rock band
- Bagatelle (music), a musical form
- Bagatelle (opera), an opéra-comique by Offenbach
- Bagatelles, Op. 119 (Beethoven)
- Bagatelles, Op. 126 (Beethoven)
- Bagatelles, Op. 33 (Beethoven)
- Bagatelles (Dvořák)

== Other uses ==
- Bagatelle (literary technique), a literary tool
- Bagatelle (TV series)
- Bagatelle Plantation, listed on the National Register of Historic Places in Iberville Parish, Louisiana
- Bagatelle (restaurant), a gourmet restaurant in Oslo, Norway
- Bagatelle, Dominica, a village in southeastern Dominica
- Bagatelle, a village in Tobago
- Bagatelle, a community in Diego Martin, Trinidad
- Château de Bagatelle, a castle in the Bois de Boulogne, Paris
- Parc Bagatelle, a theme park in Berck, France
- "Bagatelle", a science fiction short story by John Varley
- Bagatelle, the Edward H. Bennett House and Studio in Lake Forest, Illinois
- The Bagatelles, a collection of comics written and printed by Benjamin Franklin
