= Für Elise =

Composition for piano by Ludwig van Beethoven

- Piano music by Ludwig van Beethoven
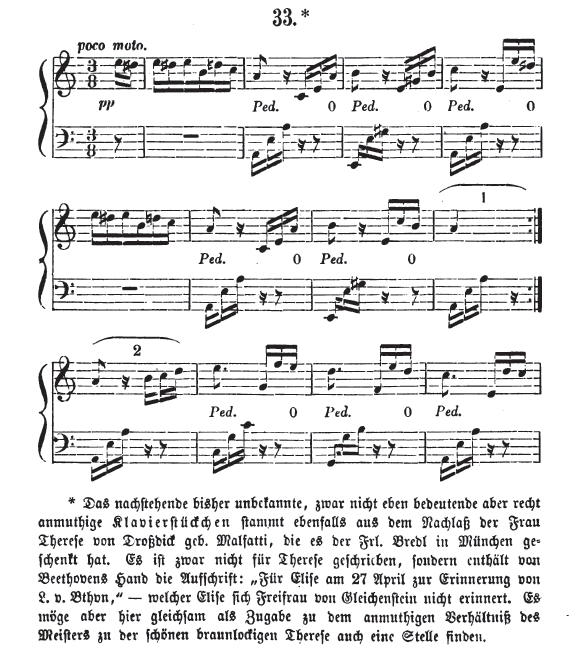
- First edition, 1867
- English: For Elise
- Full title: Bagatelle No. 25 A minor: Für Elise
- Key: A minor
- Catalogue: WoO 59—; Bia 515
- Genre: Bagatelle, Classical Music
- Composed: 27 April 1810
- Published: 1867
- Bagatelle in A minor

Bagatelle No. 25 (Note: Assuming that Beethoven's Op. 33 Bagatelles are numbers 1 to 7, Op. 119 Bagatelles are numbers 8 to 18 and Op. 126 Bagatelles are numbers 19 to 24) in A minor (WoO 59, Bia 515) for solo piano, commonly known as "Für Elise" (German: [fyːɐ̯ ʔeˈliːzə], transl. 'For Elise'), is one of Ludwig van Beethoven's most popular compositions. It was not published during his lifetime but discovered by Ludwig Nohl 40 years after his death, and may be termed either a Bagatelle or an Albumblatt. The identity of "Elise" is unknown; researchers have suggested Therese Malfatti, Elisabeth Röckel, and Elise Barensfeld.

== History ==
The score was published in 1867, 40 years after Beethoven's death. The discoverer of the piece, Ludwig Nohl, affirmed that the original autograph manuscript, now lost, had the title: "Für Elise am 27 April [1810] zur Erinnerung von L. v. Bthvn" ("For Elise on 27 April [1810] in memory by L. v. Bthvn"). The music was published as part of Nohl's Neue Briefe Beethovens (New Letters by Beethoven) on pages 28 to 33, printed in Stuttgart by Johann Friedrich Cotta.

The version of "Für Elise" heard today is an earlier version transcribed by Nohl. A revised version from 1822, with drastic changes to the accompaniment, was transcribed from a manuscript by the Beethoven scholar Barry Cooper. The most notable difference is that in the first theme, the left-hand arpeggios are delayed by a 16th note. There are a few extra bars in the transitional section into the B section. The rising A minor arpeggio figure comes later in the piece. The tempo marking Poco moto is believed to have been on the manuscript Nohl transcribed, now lost. The later version includes the marking Molto grazioso. It is believed that Beethoven intended to add the piece to a cycle of bagatelles.

Whatever the validity of Nohl's edition, an editorial peculiarity of it involves whether the second right-hand note in bar 7, that is, the first note of the three-note upbeat figure that characterizes the main melody, is an E_{4} or a D_{4}. Nohl's score gives E_{4} in bar 7 but D_{4} in all parallel passages. Many editions change all the figures to begin with E_{4} until the final bars, where D_{4} is used and resolved by adding a C to the final A octave. But the use of D4 in bar 7 can be traced to a draft Beethoven wrote that is today housed in the Beethoven-Haus Bonn. Another point in favor of D_{4} is that the ascending seventh of the motive in this form is repeated in sequence in bars 9 to 11, which begin the second section of the principal theme.

The pianist and musicologist Luca Chiantore argues in his thesis and his 2010 book Beethoven al piano (new Italian edition: Beethoven al pianoforte, 2014) that Beethoven might not have given the piece the form in which we know it today. Chiantore suggests that the original signed manuscript, which Nohl claimed to have transcribed, might not have existed. On the other hand, Barry Cooper wrote, in a 1984 essay in The Musical Times, that one of two surviving sketches closely resembles the published version.

== Identity of "Elise" ==
It is not certain who "Elise" was, although scholars have suggested possibilities. Evidence suggests that "Elise" was a close friend of Beethoven and probably an important figure in his life.

=== Therese Malfatti ===
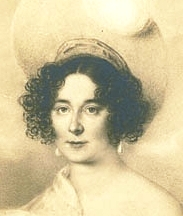
Therese Malfatti, widely believed to have been the dedicatee of "Für Elise"

Max Unger suggested that Nohl may have transcribed the title incorrectly and that the original work was named "Für Therese", a reference to Therese Malfatti von Rohrenbach zu Dezza. She was a friend and student of Beethoven's to whom he supposedly proposed in 1810, and who married the Austrian nobleman and state official Wilhelm von Droßdik in 1816. The piano sonata no. 24, dedicated to Countess Thérèse von Brunswick, is also sometimes called "für Therese".

The Austrian musicologist Michael Lorenz has shown that Rudolf Schachner, who inherited Therese von Droßdik's musical scores in 1851, was the son of Babette Bredl, born out of wedlock. In 1865, Bredl let Nohl copy the autograph in her possession. Robert Greenberg, who teaches music through The Great Courses and at the San Francisco Conservatory of Music, has said that Beethoven's sloppy handwriting might easily have led anyone to misread "Für Therese" as "Für Elise".

=== Elisabeth Röckel ===
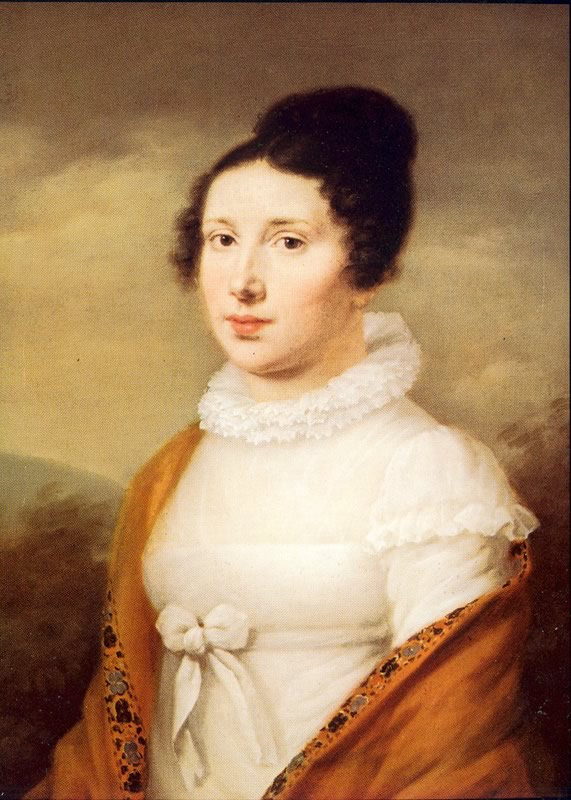
A portrait of Elisabeth Röckel, by Joseph Willibrord Mähler

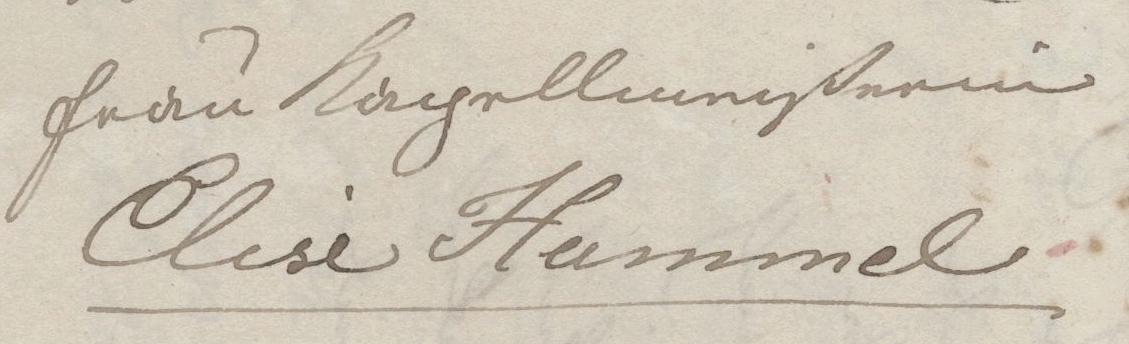
Anna Milder-Hauptmann, letter to "Frau Kapellmeisterin Elise Hummel", 1830

According to a 2010 study by Klaus Martin Kopitz, there is evidence that the piece was written for the 17-year-old German soprano singer Elisabeth Röckel, the younger sister of Joseph August Röckel, who played Florestan in the 1806 revival of Beethoven's opera Fidelio. "Elise", as she was called by a parish priest (she later called herself "Betty"), had been a friend of Beethoven's since 1808, and according to Kopitz, he may have wanted to marry her.

In April 1810, Elisabeth Röckel received an engagement at the theater in Bamberg, where she made her stage debut as Donna Anna in Mozart's Don Giovanni and became a friend of the writer E. T. A. Hoffmann. In 1811, Röckel returned to Vienna, where in 1813 she married Beethoven's friend Johann Nepomuk Hummel.

In 2015, Kopitz published more material about Beethoven's relationship to Röckel and "Für Elise". It shows that she was also a close friend of Anna Milder-Hauptmann and lived with her and her brother Joseph August in the Theater an der Wien. In an 1830 letter to Röckel, Milder-Hauptmann called her "Elise".

In 2020 an extended English version of Kopitz's essay was published with some new sources.

=== Elise Barensfeld ===
In 2014, the Canadian musicologist Rita Steblin suggested that Elise Barensfeld might be the dedicatee. Born in Regensburg and treated for a while as a child prodigy, she first took concert tours with Beethoven's friend Johann Nepomuk Mälzel, also from Regensburg, and then lived with him for some time in Vienna, where she received singing lessons from Antonio Salieri. Steblin argues that Beethoven dedicated this work to the 13-year-old Barensfeld as a favor to Therese Malfatti, who lived opposite Mälzel's and Barensfeld's residence and might have given her piano lessons. Steblin says her hypothesis is uncertain.

== Music ==
The piece can be heard as a five-part rondo in the form A-B-A-C-A. It is in A minor and in 3/8 time. It begins with the refrain (A), a flowing melody in binary form marked Poco moto (literally "a little motion", a marking that appears nowhere else in Beethoven's works), with an arpeggiated accompaniment. The unaccompanied oscillation between the dominant E and its chromatic lower neighbor D♯ that begins the melody has become one of the most recognizable openings in classical music, but it also serves as a main topic of musical discussion.

The digression at measure 9 glances at the relative major before returning to the original theme and key, preceded by a prolongation of the dominant, E, that extends the opening lower-neighbor oscillation. The pitch outline of these bars, E-F-E-D-C-B, i.e. an upper-neighbor ascent to F_{5} followed by a descending scale, also forms the basis of the two episodes, B and C, thus unifying the piece. The B section that begins in bar 23 is in the submediant, F major. Its theme begins by tracing the above outline in somewhat elaborated fashion and modulates to the dominant, followed by 32nd-note runs repeating a cadential progression in C major in a codetta-like passage.

The chordal three-note upbeats in the left hand are anticipated by the transition to this episode in bar 22. This suggests a rather expansive form, but Beethoven suddenly returns to the dominant of A minor in bar 34, once again lingering on E and its lower neighbor and leading to an exact repeat of the A section. Although another nominal episode follows (C) at bar 59, it does not leave the tonic and is rather coda-like, unfolding over a tonic pedal and emphatically cadencing in the home key. Once again, there are unifying relationships with previous material.

The melody retraces the descending outline alluded to earlier, and the cadence in bars 66–67 is an augmented version of the theme's cadence in bars 7–8. After a glance at a Neapolitan harmony (B-flat major) and a cadence at bar 76 that brings the music to a complete halt for the only time, an ascending A minor arpeggio and a chromatic descent over two octaves follows, sort of a cadenza in tempo, leading to a final repetition of the A section. The piece concludes without a postlude.

Kopitz presents the finding by the German organ scholar Johannes Quack that the letters that spell Elise can be decoded as the first three notes of the piece. Because E♭ is called Es in German and pronounced "S", we have E–(L)–(I)–S–E: E–(L)–(I)–E♭–E, which by enharmonic equivalence sounds the same as the written notes E–(L)–(I)–D♯–E.

Incipit:

== Popularity ==
"Für Elise" is widely recognized. It is of intermediate difficulty, graded at a level 7 out of 10 by The Royal Conservatory of Music. Many children's toys incorporate the tune. In Taiwan, it is one of two melodies played on garbage trucks to alert residents of their presence; the other is Maiden's Prayer. In Sri Lanka the melody is used to announce the presence of tuk tuks from which bread is sold.

In the early 2000s, "Für Elise" had become a standard ringtone, and nearly every ringtone website featured at least one version.

Mina Yang suggests that the melody is popular because the first eight bars can so easily be adapted into a limited "sonic palette", making the melody well-suited to ringtones and music boxes. Moreover, the first eight bars have some interesting structural properties:

The opening chromatic trill allows immediate identification of the work. The first four antecedent bars are answered neatly by the next four consequent bars, and then the whole eight bars can be looped and repeated ad infinitum.
