= Röckel =

Röckel is a surname. Notable people with the surname include:

- August Röckel (1814–1876), German composer and conductor, son of Joseph August
- Elisabeth Röckel (1793–1883), German operatic soprano, sister of Joseph August
- Joseph August Röckel (1783–1870), German operatic tenor and opera producer
- Helen Rockel (born 1945), New Zealand artist
