= List of Princess Tutu episodes =

Princess Tutu is an anime series. It was originally broadcast in two seasons. The first season, "Kapitel des Eies" ("Chapter of the Egg"), consisted of 13 half-hour episodes. The second season was broadcast as 24 quarter-hour episodes and one half hour episode, to conform to the format of the time slot, so that each episode was split into two parts. These were brought back together in the DVD release as 13 complete episodes. The second season is called "Kapitel des Jungens" ("Chapter of the Chick") in R2 DVDs, and "Kapitel (sic) des Kükens" ("Chapter of the Fledgling") in R1 DVDs.

In 2004, ADV Films announced that they had licensed the anime series for distribution in North America. ADV Films produced English adaptations for all episodes and, beginning in 2005, the series was periodically released as single DVD "volumes" that each contained several episodes. In 2007, the series was released as a complete DVD collection of all 26 episodes. In 2011, AEsir Holdings announced the licensing of the series and the release of a complete DVD collection of all 26 episodes distributed by Section23 Films.

== Episode list ==
=== Season 1 (TV) ===
Akt	Episode	Translated Japanese title (German title) Romaji (Original Japanese)	Directed by	Written by	Original Air Date
1	1	"The Duck and the Prince (Der Nußknacker: Blumenwalzer)"; Transliteration: "Ahiru to ōji-sama" (Japanese: あひると王子さま)	Junichi Sato	Michiko Yokote	August 16, 2002
Duck awakes from a dream in which she is a duck watching a handsome prince dance ballet. Later, she walks early into class and discovers Mytho, a student in the advanced class, dancing alone. She has a nerve-racking conversation with him before Fakir, another student, walks in. Fakir is revealed to be domineering and condescending towards Mytho. In ballet class, we learn that Mytho is dating a girl named Rue. The teacher is a cat, yet Duck is the only one in the class to find this strange. Rue is revealed to be a talented girl in the advanced class, who most of the students look up to. After class, Duck goes to the boy's dorm to apologize to Mytho for accidentally causing him to injure his leg. Before she can work up the courage to go in, Fakir stops her and turns her away. Later that night, Duck regrets not being able to apologize to Mytho, and ponders his lonely eyes. She wishes to help him, catching the attention of the mysterious Drosselmeyer, who says to himself: "As the water flows, time has begun to move. Now, let me listen to your story!" The next morning, Fakir goes to the library. As Duck resolves to apologize to Mytho, she spots canary chicks on the dorm roof beginning to fly. One of the fledglings hesitates, and is forced to jump when a raven attacks it. Mytho leaps to catch the bird, and falls as well. To save him, Duck transforms into Princess Tutu. The bird flies away, and Mytho asks who she is. Tutu/Duck remembers that she is a duck, and runs away. The story has begun.
2	2	"Pieces of the Heart (Schwanensee: Scène finale)" Transliteration: "Kokoro no kakera" (Japanese: 心のかけら)	Shogo Koumoto	Michiko Yokote	August 23, 2002
The next day, Duck wakes up to realize that she is just a duck. Drosselmeyer appears to tell her that she is also the legendary Princess Tutu; her task is to return the pieces of heart to the Prince, Mytho. Longing to one day see Mytho smile, she decides to take up the challenge. Drosselmeyer gives back the pendant that changes her into a girl, as well as Princess Tutu. An Anteater-girl, who is bitter and jealous of Rue for her superior dancing skills, sets her eyes on Mytho. She and Mytho have a dance-off with Rue. Rue chooses Duck as her partner and they win. Duck discovers that the anteater is being influenced by a shard of Mytho's heart—the feeling of bitterness. She transforms into Princess Tutu and convinces the heart shard to return to him. Mytho regains a feeling, which worries Fakir.
3	3	"A Princess's Oath (Dornröschen: Panorama)"; Transliteration: "Purinsesu no chikai" (Japanese: プリンセスの誓い)	Matsuo Asami	Michiko Yokote	August 30, 2002
Duck learns about the book The Prince and the Raven. She discovers that its author is Drosselmeyer, and that he died a long time ago. She bumps into Mytho, who is retrieving water for Rue, while he and Rue were on a picnic. Duck uses up the water to clean a cut Mytho got, and while on a search for more water, the two stumble upon a restaurant. Inside, a woman, Ebine, serves them cold food and Duck discovers that she has another piece of Mytho's heart: the feeling of loneliness. She retrieves it and afterwards Rue (and Fakir, who had been looking for him) discuss Princess Tutu, and her fate. The audience learns that if Princess Tutu confesses her love to the Prince, she will turn into a speck of light.
4	4	"Giselle"; Transliteration: "Jizeru" (Japanese: ジゼル)	Osamu Sekita; Shogo Koumoto	Chiaki J. Konaka	September 6, 2002
Duck contemplates who she is as Princess Tutu. Mytho notes that someone is calling him, and empathizes with the feeling that that someone wants to meet someone, recognizing the feeling to be sorrow. Fakir tries to convince Mytho that he does not need a heart; meanwhile, Duck gets chastised for interrupting Rue's practice rehearsal. Duck vows to return Mytho's heart to him, while denying that she loves him. Later, Rue reiterates Fakir's words to Mytho, telling him that he loves her, and that is all he needs to know. Fakir tries to find out why Mytho is regaining his feelings. Mytho follows the aforementioned call and disappears. Duck and Rue go looking for him. They run into Edel, who tells them a story and directs them in the right direction, which enables them to find Mytho. He has found the ghost Giselle, who has been calling to him, and is offered a rosemary flower, which will allow Giselle to take him with her to the land of the dead. Rue tries to save him by dancing with Giselle, but fails. When Rue falls, Duck hides and transforms into Princess Tutu. Tutu reveals herself to Rue and dances with Giselle. She successfully gains the feeling of sadness from Giselle and gives it to Mytho. Drosselmeyer notes that the feelings returned to the Prince, thus far, are unhappy ones, and asks Tutu, "is this how you will restore happiness to the Prince?"
5	5	"On the Eve of the Fire Festival (Bilder einer Ausstellung: Die Katakomben)"; Transliteration: "Himatsuri no yoru ni" (Japanese: 火祭りの夜に)	Yū Kō	Mamiko Ikeda	September 13, 2002
Rue looks through The Prince and the Raven, and is confronted by Fakir. She hints that Princess Tutu may be real. Meanwhile, Duck learns about the Fire Festival. Duck has been charged with cleaning the room of the advanced class. She arrives at the classroom and finds Mytho, dressed in Festival garb, awaiting Rue to practice together. Since she is absent, he decides to dance with Duck instead, to her joy. Fakir sees the two and confronts Mytho, telling him to just listen to him. The two leave and Rue appears. The two talk for a few moments, and Duck goes out in search of Mytho. As punishment for not listening to him, Fakir locks Mytho in a closet. Outraged, Duck tries to open the locked door, and lets slip that she knows that Mytho is regaining the pieces of his heart. Fakir becomes suspicious and questions her. Duck discovers that both Rue and Fakir know about Mytho being the Prince from the story. Fakir aggressively tells Duck that Mytho does not need a heart. In the closet, Mytho hears a voice talking to him from a strange glowing panel in the floor. Edel appears once more, and points out an open window that Duck can go through. She does and she falls onto the glowing panel, which opens and causes her to tumble down into some catacombs. She goes in search of Mytho, and a voice begins telling her riddles. She gets them all wrong, but finds the room Mytho is in, regardless, and gets locked in the room. She transforms into Princess Tutu, and finally gets the answer to the riddles, revealing the voice as a lamp with a piece of heart. Tutu dances while the lamp spotlights her. The lamp reveals that she once shone for people, but was cast aside. She now wants Mytho so that she can shine for him. Tutu talks the lamp into releasing Mytho, and promises to take the lamp with her. Mytho's feeling of affection is returned to him. Rue, waiting for Mytho at the plaza even after the festival ends, finally turns to leave but finds Mytho in her path. They dance while Duck looks on, lamp in hand. Smiling, Rue looks up at Mytho, to find him looking at her with gentle eyes. His emotion surprises her, and she runs away. Fakir is seen glaring, and Duck looks unhappily after Rue.
6	6	"The Dreaming Aurora (Dornröschen: Prolog)"; Transliteration: "Yumemiru ōrora" (Japanese: 夢見るオーロラ)	Tatsufumi Itō	Takuya Satō	September 20, 2002
A traveling ballet troupe comes into town and Duck's whole class gets time off to go and see the troupe practice. Duck sees that a heart shard has taken possession of the lead in the upcoming Sleeping Beauty show, but it leaves when the void in her heart is filled when the lead's husband encourages and supports her. Duck chases after the shard and asks it to return to Mytho, but it instead attacks her with a sword. Despite its obvious reluctance, Duck catches it and returns it to Mytho. The shard turns out to be the feeling of fear and uncertainty, and once it is returned Mytho becomes afraid of Princess Tutu. Duck is shocked and dismayed that her attempt to help Mytho has ended with him in pain.
7	7	"Raven Princess (An der schönen blauen Donau)"; Transliteration: "Karasu hime" (Japanese: からす姫)	Yasushi Muroya	Michiko Yokote	September 27, 2002
Distraught over what she has done to Mytho, Duck thinks about giving up being Princess Tutu, but knows that if she does she can no longer be a girl. Drosselmeyer is worried that the story will be frozen again if Duck quits, so he stops time to encourage her. His pep talk, however, achieves the opposite of his intentions: Duck throws her pendant into the river, transforming back into a duck. Meanwhile, Mytho is confused at the new emotions he is feeling and wanders to the river. There, the heart shard of curiosity takes him deep underwater. Duck tries to save him but cannot in her duck form, so she retrieves her pendant and becomes Princess Tutu once more. Mytho tells her that he does not want her to go; that he wants her to restore his heart. Gladdened, Tutu is about to restore his feeling of curiosity when it is suddenly stolen by the Raven Princess, Kraehe.
8	8	"The Fountain of Warriors (Fantasie-Ouvertüre "Romeo und Julia")"; Transliteration: "Senshi no izumi" (Japanese: 戦士の泉)	Kiyoko Sayama	Mamiko Ikeda	October 4, 2002
Rue wakes up and cannot remember what happened the night before. She finds Mytho's heart shard in one of her drawers. It questions her and asks her who she really is, but she is unable to answer. Duck ponders whether or not to tell Mytho she is Princess Tutu. Mytho defies Fakir, who, realizing he can no longer control Mytho, retrieves the sword of the prince to break Mytho's heart into pieces again. Kraehe (an unwitting Rue) appears and tries to steal Mytho from Princess Tutu, and then Fakir appears and tries to break Mytho's heart. Princess Tutu is able to stop him, and she also returns the heart shard of curiosity. However, she despairs of Mytho finding out she is in reality just a duck.
9	9	"Black Shoes (Bilder einer Ausstellung: Alten Schloß)"; Transliteration: "Kuroi būtsu" (Japanese: 黒い靴)	Tatsufumi Itō	Chiaki J. Konaka	October 11, 2002
Fakir, having failed to shatter Mytho's heart, wonders what he should do: should he give up, especially now since Mytho wants to restore his heart? Rue has her own demons to deal with, as she tries to convince herself that there is only one of her. But Rue does not want Mytho to change, so she decides to accept her role as Kraehe. Duck finds another piece of Mytho's heart, devotion, possessing a student artist. Princess Tutu removes the heart shard, but Kraehe appears and takes it from her. Mytho comes and Kraehe's resolve wavers when the one she loves stands against her, giving Princess Tutu enough time to restore the heart shard.
10	10	"Cinderella (Aschenbrödel: Walzer-Coda)"; Transliteration: "Shinderera" (Japanese: シンデレラ)	Kiyoko Sayama	Mamiko Ikeda	October 18, 2002
Kraehe retreats for the moment, and Fakir lunges at Princess Tutu with a shard of glass, missing but cutting the chain of her pendant. Princess Tutu turns into a duck, and by the time she realizes the pendant is missing, it is gone. She searches for it all night and finds that Fakir is keeping it. She spends the next day trying to get it back, finally succeeding at dusk. Meanwhile the audience learns that Fakir is an orphan, and his adoptive father a swordsmith. Fakir tells his father that he has realized he is the reincarnation of the knight from the story the Prince and the Raven, but is afraid because it is the knight's fate to die, torn in half by the raven. Duck sees that Fakir's father is possessed by the heart shard of regret, and goes to recover it. Now free of regret, Fakir's father gives the knight's sword to Fakir and tells him to follow his heart. When returning to the school, Fakir sees Duck and notices the pendant she is wearing, and realizes that she is Princess Tutu.
11	11	"La Sylphide"; Transliteration: "Ra shirufīdo" (Japanese: ラ・シルフィード)	Yasushi Muroya	Takuya Satō	October 25, 2002
Mytho, inspired by an overheard conversation between Duck and her two friends, decides to give a present to Princess Tutu to express his feelings and to find out how she feels. He goes out to town with Rue, where they find Edel selling gems. Edel gives Mytho a gem called Love, but warns him that although beautiful, it can be dangerous and delicate. Rue, aware of the gem's intended recipient, is jealous and scuffs it, then tells Mytho she will shine it and make it even more beautiful. Instead, she curses the gem with hatred and spells a raven's feather inside before giving it back to Mytho. Mytho gives it to Princess Tutu, who discovers the heart shard of love is inside. She is about to return it when Kraehe's hatred manifests and binds her. Kraehe appears and rips the half-returned heart shard out of Mytho's chest.
12	12	"Banquet of Darkness (Scheherazade)"; Transliteration: "Yami no utage" (Japanese: 闇の宴)	Yukio Nishimoto	Michiko Yokote	November 1, 2002
Kraehe and Mytho have vanished. Princess Tutu helps Fakir back to his dorm and binds his wounds, and when he wakes up they decide to search together for Mytho, though Fakir still refuses to team up with Duck. They search everywhere but find nothing, until they happen upon Edel, who shows them the way. In the passage, Duck is so clumsy that Fakir wonders if she and Tutu can even be the same person. She trips and he moves to save her, and they both ending up falling down a deep hole. Duck reveals to him that she is actually a duck and transforms to find a way to get out. Together, Duck and Fakir go to where the final stage has been set.
13	13	"Swan Lake (Schwanensee)"; Transliteration: "Hakuchō no mizuumi" (Japanese: 白鳥の湖)	Junichi Sato	Mamiko Ikeda	November 8, 2002
Duck and Fakir arrive at the stage where Kraehe is keeping Mytho, and Kraehe says she will give the shard of love back if Tutu confesses her feelings, knowing full well that if Tutu does she will turn into a speck of light and vanish. Tutu is prepared to sacrifice herself but Fakir stops her. He fights his way through the ravens in order to break the sword of the prince so Mytho's heart can never be shattered again. Tutu resolves to go on, and she decides to express her feelings through dance. Mytho is moved by Tutu's dance and he and the heart shard go to her, and his heart is repaired. The stage vanishes and they are lost in darkness, but a flame appears to show them the way out. The flame is Edel, who has set herself on fire to guide them back to safety. Edel makes a last request to Tutu and Mytho, that she might see them dance together. Princess Tutu and the Prince dance a duet, while Drosselmeyer muses on how they were able to overcome their tragic fate through much pain.

=== Season 2 (TV) ===
Akt	Episode	Translated Japanese title (German title) Romaji (Original Japanese)	Directed by	Written by	Original Air Date
14	1	"The Raven (Blumenwalzer)"; Transliteration: "Ōgarasu" (Japanese: 大鴉)	Shogo Koumoto	Michiko Yokote	November 15, 2002 (Part 1); November 22, 2002 (Part 2)
The beginning starts with Duck dreaming of dancing with Mytho as herself, not Princess Tutu, until he makes the mark for death and turns into an injured Fakir. Shocked, Duck wakes and recalls what happened when she saved Mytho from Princess Kraehe. Later in the day Duck bumps into Mytho and Fakir and contemplates telling Mytho everything, but Fakir distracts Mytho so she can keep the fact she is a duck a secret from Mytho. Fakir wonders why Mytho does not want to know Princess Tutu's real identity, but Mytho tells him it doesn't matter because he believes she will tell him herself one day after he has gotten all of his heart back. Drosslemeyer comments on how the days are calm but says they will not stay so forever. In class Mr. Cat tells a story of meeting a legendary dancer in his younger years to explain the importance of practicing the basics of ballet. During the story the still-corrupted heart shard in Mytho's heart acts up, and he later steals the shoes given to Mr. Cat by his role model. Rue speaks with her father, who is revealed to be the Raven from the story, and praises how the raven's blood in Mytho's body is changing him like they wanted. Meanwhile, Duck climbs to the roof of the dorms and sees first a crow, and then Mytho jumping from his dorm window while talking to Fakir. For a second time, Duck transforms into Princess Tutu to save him.
15	2	"Coppelia"; Transliteration: "Kopperia" (Japanese: コッペリア)	Yasushi Muroya	Mamiko Ikeda	November 29, 2002 (Part 1); December 6, 2002 (Part 2)
Rumors fly about the incident between Mytho and Fakir. After a second altercation involving Rue, Fakir is banned from the school for a week. It is revealed that because Mytho's heart shard of love had been soaked in Raven's blood, he will turn into a raven when all of his heart shards are returned. Rue and her father need Princess Tutu in order to complete the prince's heart and the Raven warns Rue that she cannot try to make Tutu disappear. Under the raven blood's influence, Mytho asks Pique out, seeking her pure heart as a sacrifice to the Raven. He demands that she love only him and hate all others. Pique and Mytho meet at night where he tries to take her heart, but Princess Tutu stops this by explaining to her that she did not truly love Mytho. Duck returns Pique and Mytho to the school, where she stays with Pique until the next morning. Pique forgets about having loved Mytho and the friendship between the girls is repaired.
16	3	"Maiden's Prayer (Gebet einer Jungfrau)"; Transliteration: "Otome no inori" (Japanese: 乙女の祈り)	Tatsufumi Itō	Rika Nakase	December 13, 2002 (Part 1); December 20, 2002 (Part 2)
The beautiful Freya becomes the next target for Mytho. He tries but fails to get her heart once in the practice room, forestalled by the appearance of Princess Tutu. Duck meets a mysterious little child with a drum in town. She meets Fakir by the smith's shop and learns that the child name Uzura was made from the unburned wood left from the puppet Edel who saved Fakir, Duck, and Mytho after the duet at the underground lake. Later, a contest is held in the school, with the prize being the opportunity to dance alongside Mytho. Freya wins the contest. At the fountain, Mytho tries to take her heart yet again, but is stopped by Fakir and Princess Tutu. Freya is saved, but Mytho disappears. The Raven is upset at Kraehe for being unable to present him with a suitable heart.
17	4	"Crime and Punishment (Carmen Aragonaise)"; Transliteration: "Tsumi to bachi" (Japanese: 罪と罰)	Harume Kosaka	Michiko Yokote	January 10, 2003 (Part 1); January 17, 2003 (Part 2)
A new "prince" appears. The romantic, Femio, claims to be a prince who is to love and be loved by all. Upon meeting Duck, he gives her a rose to show his love for her. Later at practice, he takes the first solo, although he is still on probation. During his embarrassing performance (not ballet at all, more like a weird collection of movements) Mytho is jarred by what he says and mimes "I love you" before collapsing. Uzura, the puppet, hears gossip that Duck and Femio are "lovey dovey" from a group of school girls. Meanwhile, while Mytho rests, Kraehe tries to obtain the heart of Femio in the back of the town library. Femio breaks the spell of his own will because of his desire to be loved by all women. He cannot choose between Kraehe and Tutu and ends up getting stampeded over by a large group of bulls. Fakir hears from Uzura that Duck is lovey dovey with Femio and tells her not to repeat gossip. Upon leaving the library, Duck finds Fakir in the herd of bulls with Uzura. Duck mimes "I love you" to Fakir, much to his embarrassment, and asks him why Mytho would have done it. Kraehe speaks with Mytho afterwards where she learns that he knew she would not have been able to get the love necessary to obtain a heart, which hurts Kraehe's feelings.
18	5	"Wandering Knight (Egmont Ouvertüre)"; Transliteration: "Samayoeru kishi" (Japanese: 彷徨える騎士)	Tomio Yamauchi; Yukio Nishimoto	Mamiko Ikeda	January 24, 2003 (Part 1); January 31, 2003 (Part 2)
Fakir has a dream that he fights and slays a ghost knight. He is cast in the drama club's play as the ghost knight, who turns up in a forest nearby. He fights the ghost knight, but becomes lost in the forest when Tutu and the ghost knight dance. The ghost knight comes to peace with his past and becomes the shard for pride, which is returned to Mytho. Duck is injured and Fakir doubts himself.
19	6	"A Midsummer Night's Dream (Ein Sommernachtstraum)"; Transliteration: "Manatsu no yoru no yume" (Japanese: 真夏の夜の夢)	Yasushi Muroya	Rika Nakase	February 7, 2003 (Part 1); February 14, 2003 (Part 2)
Duck's friends write a love letter from Duck to Fakir. Duck almost gives it to a messenger dressed as a donkey, but ends up becoming friends with her. Mytho targets the messenger, who happens to already be in love with a sculptor at the school, but fails when Princess Tutu intervenes. Tutu talks her into confessing her love to the sculptor. Uzura finds the fake love letter from Duck to Fakir and gives it to him. Fakir tells Duck to not waste her time with trivial matters. Mytho tells Kraehe that he does not care about her, but only wants to get a heart for the Raven as a token of gratitude.
20	7	"A Forgotten Story (Die verkaufte Braut)"; Transliteration: "Wasurerareta monogatari" (Japanese: 忘れられた物語)	Tatsufumi Itō	Mamiko Ikeda	February 21, 2003 (Part 1); February 28, 2003 (Part 2)
Duck meets a girl named Raetsel, who is possibly a sister figure to Fakir. Raetsel tells Duck that Fakir used to write stories that eventually came true. Duck asks Fakir to write a story where Mytho is cured from the blood of the raven, however Fakir refuses. Mytho tries to steal the heart of Raetsel, however Princess Tutu interjects and saves her. Fakir battles with Mytho in order to save Rachel, however is almost killed before the real Mytho awakens and tells them to run away.
21	8	"The Spinners (Lieder ohne Worte)"; Transliteration: "Tsumugu mono-tachi" (Japanese: 紡ぐ者たち)	Yukio Nishimoto	Rika Nakase	March 7, 2003 (Part 1); March 14, 2003 (Part 2)
Fakir finds that Autor left a book for him. Fakir tracks him down and Autor tells him that he is a direct descendant of Drosselmeyer. Fakir is tested by Autor to see if he truly has the power. After training for three days he has to listen to the voice of a piece of an oak tree, and if he fails, he will become one with the earth. He is about to fail and turned into a tree when Duck transforms into Princess Tutu and saves him.
22	9	"Crown of Stone (Das große Tor von Kiew)"; Transliteration: "Ishi no kanmuri" (Japanese: 石の冠)	Yasushi Muroya	Chiaki J. Konaka	March 21, 2003 (Part 1); March 28, 2003 (Part 2)
Fakir is finally able to speak to the oak tree. Meanwhile Duck skips class to see how Fakir is doing and in turn Neko Sensei asks if he can have a word with her. He tells her that if she has a dream, she shouldn't just decide to do nothing. Duck realizes that she just assumed she cannot help Mytho anymore and sets out in search of the rest of the heart shards, without realizing that Neko Sensei was talking about his marriage with her. She then sees Mytho where she accidentally turns herself into a duck. Mytho, not knowing she is Princess Tutu, tells her how he wants to love the world and protect it, but at the same time wants all the love in the world for himself. Duck sees the two sides of his heart and decides to try her best. Though she searches the city for hours, she eventually finds that there is no place with a heart piece but the gates leading out of the city. She turns into Princess Tutu and climbs above the gate only to find that there is nothing but a wall beyond the town. Meanwhile, mysterious people come to Fakir and tell him that his hands shall be cut off like Drosselmeyer's were years ago. They claimed this was their duty for generations and now it was Fakir's turn. They take Fakir to Drossselmeyer's grave where they are about to cut his hands off. Meanwhile, Princess Tutu is still on top of the gate, and from her height she sees what is happening to Fakir. In order to save him she interjects, but Drosselmeyer takes her into his world so that the mysterious people don't find out too much. Fakir comes to realize that everything is a story and that if he wants to save Mytho, he has to fight Drosselmeyer's story itself. At the same time, Rue meets Autor and takes him to an unknown place where he tells her he has fallen in love with her enough to take his life. Not believing him, Rue tells Autor to leave.
23	10	"Marionettes (Ruslan und Ludmilla)"; Transliteration: "Marionette" (Japanese: マリオネッテ)	Tatsufumi Itō	Chiaki J. Konaka	April 4, 2003 (Part 1); April 11, 2003 (Part 2)
Tutu has been captured and brought to the puppet world that is made entirely of gears. Fakir realizes that he has to write a story to get her out of there, but is having a hard time thinking of what he should write. Tutu wanders the puppet world puppets of clowns gather around her saying she stopped the story and the gears. Her whole body is turned to puppet and she meets Drosselmeyer, where he demands she become one of his puppets and do whatever he tells her so the story will not end. Meanwhile, Uzura meets the ghost of Edel at the bottom of the story machine and starts to turn the gears of the story backwards, prompting flashbacks and revelations for Rue, Duck, and Fakir. Fakir finally manages to write Tutu out of the machine, and calls her back out to him. Drosselmeyer isn't pleased that Tutu escaped.
24	11	"The Prince and the Raven (Danse Macabre)"; Transliteration: "Ōji to karasu" (Japanese: 王子とカラス)	Yukio Nishimoto	Rika Nakase	April 18, 2003 (Part 1); April 25, 2003 (Part 2)
Fakir questions why he was able to write Duck's story, but not one to save Mytho right then. Duck tries to get Rue to help her find the rest of the shards, but Rue refuses. The Raven is revived and after transforming most of the townsfolks into humanoid ravens, calls on Mytho to offer his heart.
25	12	"The Dying Swan (Romeo und Julia)"; Transliteration: "Hinshi no hakuchō" (Japanese: 瀕死の白鳥)	Shogo Koumoto	Mamiko Ikeda	May 2, 2003 (Part 1); May 9, 2003 (Part 2)
The Raven consumes Rue, who by now learns that the Raven is her adoptive father and that he stole her from her real parents to serve him, but she is still alive inside him. Mytho asks Tutu to restore the final piece of his heart so that he can go save her, but she finds herself unable to remove her pendent. Duck asks Fakir to write her story as she goes to return the pendant to Mytho. Despite interference from Drosselmeyer, Fakir manages to continue writing, enabling Tutu to remove and hand Mytho the pendent, permanently reverting back to her true form.
26	13	"Finale (Der Nußknacker)"; Transliteration: "Fināre" (Japanese: フィナーレ)	Yukio Nishimoto	Michiko Yokote	May 23, 2003
The Raven attacks Mytho. Duck tries to help but is unable. Fakir seems only capable of writing what is happening and is able to change the outcome. As a result, Duck is able to finally help, allowing Mytho to defeat the Raven, rescue Rue, and turn everyone back to normal. Rue is now on good terms with Duck and Mytho invites Rue to be his princess. Drosselmeyer is displeased that the story ended happily, but decides to observe another story.

== Music themes ==
Both the opening theme, "Morning Grace", and the ending theme, "Although My Love Is Small", are sung by Ritsuko Okazaki. Throughout the series, a classical style pervades the soundtrack, which includes recordings of such classical composers as Pyotr Ilyich Tchaikovsky, Johann Strauss II, and Erik Satie.
