= Elise Barensfeld =

German soprano

- Born: Juliane Katharine Elisabet Barensfeld; 27 August 1796; Regensburg, Holy Roman Empire
- Died: after 1820
- Occupation: Soprano
- Known for: Potential dedicatee of Für Elise

Elise Barensfeld (born Juliane Katharine Elisabet Barensfeld; 27 August 1796 – after 1820), was a German soprano. She toured from age 12 with Johann Nepomuk Mälzel, a friend of Ludwig van Beethoven, and lived in Mälzel's household in Vienna until age 17. In 2012, Rita Steblin claimed that Beethoven may have dedicated his piano piece Für Elise to her.

== Career ==
Born Juliane Katharine Elisabet Barensfeld in Regensburg, Holy Roman Empire, and often called Elise, she was known as a child prodigy. She received first voice lessons in her home town from Johann Franz Xaver Sterkel (1750–1817), who dedicated two songs to her, published in his 12th song collection. The texts were written by Benedikt Josef M. von Koller: "Mädchen mit der Silberstimme" (Girl with the silvery voice) and "Schön ist einer Rose jugendliche Knospe" (Beautiful is a rose's youthful bud).

She toured at age 12 with Regensburg mechanic Johann Nepomuk Mälzel, who invented the metronome and was a friend of Ludwig van Beethoven. She continued her voice studies from 1809 in Vienna with Antonio Salieri. She lived in the Mälzel household until she left Vienna at age 17 in 1813. She performed as a soloist in a concert in 1812 which is regarded as the foundation of the Gesellschaft der Musikfreunde. She was later a Kammersängerin of the Großherzogin of Baden. There are no traces of her after 1820.

The musicologist Rita Steblin argued in 2012 that Beethoven dedicated his piano piece Für Elise to Barensfeld. The dedication read "Für Elise am 27. April zur Erinnerung von L. v. Bthvn." ("For Elise on 27 April as a remembrance, from Ludwig van Beethoven."). The later owner of the manuscript, Therese Malfatti, was connected to her, living across the street from Mälzel. Steblin thinks that Malfatti could have taught piano to Barensfeld when she was age 13. However, there is no evidence that she belonged to Beethoven's circle.

== Literature ==
- Rita Steblin: Who was Beethoven’s “Elise”? A new solution to the mystery, in: The Musical Times, Vol. 155, No. 1927 (Summer 2014), pp. 3–39
- Michael Lorenz: "A Letter to the Editor of The Musical Times" (Vienna, 2014)
