= Storm of Love (disambiguation) =

Storm of Love is a German TV soap opera.

Storm of Love may also refer to:

- "Storm of Love", a song by Buck Owenson the album Together Again, 1964; covered by various artists, including Rodney Crowell on Jewel of the South, 1995
- Storm of Love (film), a 1929 German silent film
- Ai no Arashi (lit. 'Storm of Love'), see list of Strawberry Panic episodes
- Storm of Love, TV show of the pentecostal Universal Church of the Kingdom of God, Brazil

== See also ==
- Âsifah min al-houbb, 1961 Egyptian film by Hussein Helmi al-Mouhandès
- "Dil Men Pyar Ka Toofaan" (lit. 'Storm of Love In My Heart'), a song by Lata Mangeshkar from the 1958 Indian film Yahudi
