= Maiden's Prayer =

1856 piano composition by Tekla Bądarzewska-Baranowska

- Piano variations by Tekla Bądarzewska
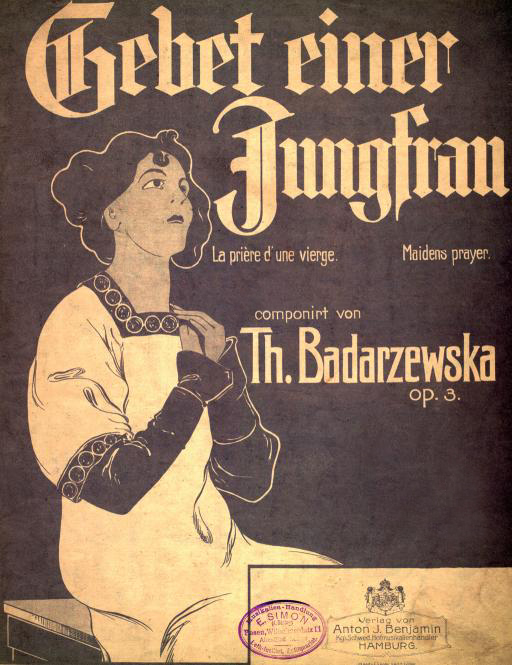
- Cover of the "Maiden's Prayer" by Thecla Badarzewska, 1900
- Key: E♭ major
- Catalogue: Op. 4
- Published: 1856
- Duration: 3–6 minutes (Note: Depending on repeats observed)

"A Maiden's Prayer"
MIDI rendition

"[A] Maiden's Prayer" (original Polish: "Modlitwa dziewicy", French: "La prière d'une vierge"), Op. 4, is a piano composition by Polish composer Tekla Bądarzewska-Baranowska. It was published in 1856 in Warsaw, and then as a supplement to the Revue et gazette musicale de Paris in 1859. It is a relatively short piano variations piece of intermediate difficulty. In the 20th and 21st centuries, the piece has been widely popularized by popular media, country music, and performing pianists such as Lang Lang.

== In country music ==
"Maiden's Prayer"

Single by Bob Wills and His Texas Playboys
- B-side: "Takin' It Home"
- Released: May 1941
- Recorded: February 24 1941
- Studio: WBAP Studio, Blackstone Hotel, Fort Worth, Texas
- Genre: Western swing
- Label: Okeh 06205
- Songwriter: Bob Wills

Bob Wills and His Texas Playboys singles chronology
"Take Me Back to Tulsa" (1941)	"Maiden's Prayer" (1941)	"Twin Guitar Special" (1941)

American musician Bob Wills heard A Maiden's Prayer played on a fiddle while he was a barber in Roy, New Mexico, and arranged the piece in the Western swing style. Wills first recorded it as an instrumental in 1935 (Vocalion 03924, released in 1938), and it quickly became one of his signature tunes. Later, it became a standard recorded by many country artists, including Buck Owens on his number-one 1965 album I've Got a Tiger By the Tail. The tune is still a standard in the repertoire of Western swing bands.

Wills wrote lyrics for "Maiden's Prayer" and recorded it again in 1941 (Okeh 06205) with vocals by Tommy Duncan. His lyrics reflect the title, and the song, as written by Wills, opens with:

Twilight falls, evening shadows find,
There 'neath the stars, a maiden so fair divine.
The moon on high seemed to see her there.
In her eyes is a light, shining ever so bright,
She whispered a silent prayer.

"Maiden's Prayer" was released in May 1941, and quickly hit number one on 28 June 1941, in Billboard's "Hillbilly and Foreign Record Hits of the Month".

Relatively few country singers have covered "Maiden's Prayer" with vocals, but they include Ray Price on his tribute album San Antonio Rose (1962) and Willie Nelson on his album Red Headed Stranger (on the 2000 CD reissue, but not the 1975 LP). Both singers used the lyrics written by Wills with minor variations, e.g. the maiden is an Indian in Price's version. Also the Everly Brothers recorded a rendition of the song in 1973.

Wills recorded the song a third time on the 1963 album Bob Wills Sings and Plays. When he was inducted into the Nashville Songwriters Hall of Fame in 1970, "Maiden's Prayer" was one of the works cited.

== In popular media ==
The "Maiden's Prayer" is quoted in the 1930 opera Rise and Fall of the City of Mahagonny by Kurt Weill and Bertolt Brecht. It appears midway through act 1, played on an out-of-tune piano at a honky-tonk bar frequented by prostitutes and their clients. Jakob Schmidt, one of the denizens of Mahagonny, refers to the song as ewige Kunst (eternal art).

"Maiden's Prayer" is heard off-stage in act 4 of Three Sisters by Anton Chekhov. "Maiden's Prayer" appears as an insert piano song in the anime series Strawberry Panic. "Maiden's Prayer" is played by garbage trucks in Taiwan. As residents have to take out their own trash, the garbage truck signals everyone to do so with the melody of this piece, along with Beethoven's "Für Elise".

The Rodgers and Hart standard "It Never Entered My Mind" refers to this song in the penultimate line.

In the 1955 Italian Scandal in Sorrento film, Antonio and Violante play the tune together on a piano at the very end of the movie.

In Nobuhiko Obayashi's 1977 horror movie House, the character Melody plays the opening section of "A Maiden's Prayer" on the piano a few times.

In 1993, the North Korean Wangjaesan Dance Troupe's VHS tape featured this song in electronic arrangement.

In the 2013 television serial The Tunnel, Anglo-French actor and singer Charlotte Gainsbourg performs a voice-over to the tune of the "Maiden's Prayer", singing a mixture of French and English:

Venez dans mes bras, closer to me, dear.
Donnez-vous à moi; set aside all fear.
Restons enlacés pour l'éternité,
Yes, you shall be mine till the end of time.

The piece remains especially popular in east Asia. In Japan, the melody of Bądarzewska's "Maiden Prayer" is played when the platform doors of Shinkansen bullet trains close.

== In literature ==
"Maiden's Prayer" was used in a macabre context in Mary Wilkins Freeman's ghost story The Wind in the Rose-Bush (published 1903), where the main character, roused from sleep by the sound of the melody being played in a seemingly empty house, rushed downstairs to see who was at the piano, only to find no one there.

== Interpretations ==
"A Maiden's Prayer Op. 4" by Bądarzewska is featured on Lang Lang's 2019 album Piano Book, released by Deutsche Grammophon.

== Reception ==
Some have liked A Maiden’s Prayer for its charming and romantic melody, and others have described it as "sentimental salon tosh". Pianist and academic Arthur Loesser was among the critics of the piece, describing it as a "dowdy product of ineptitude."
