= August Röckel =

German composer and conductor (1814–1876)

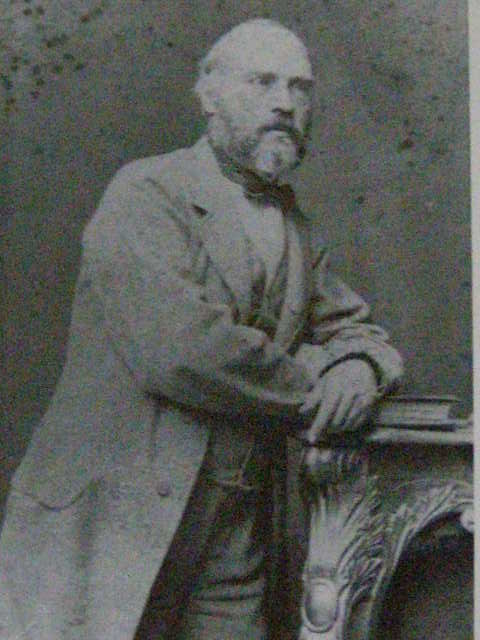
- Born: 1 December 1814; Graz, Austria
- Died: 18 June 1876 (aged 61); Budapest, Hungary
- Occupations: Composer, conductor

Carl August Röckel (1 December 1814 – 18 June 1876) was an Austrian-born German composer and conductor. He was a friend of Richard Wagner and active in the German revolutions of 1848–1849.

== Biography ==
Röckel was born in Graz. His father, Joseph August Röckel, was a tenor, choir director and theatre entrepreneur who sang the role of Florestan at the premiere of the second version of Ludwig van Beethoven's Fidelio in 1806. With his father, he experienced theatrical life in Vienna, Paris and London. He acted in Paris as assistant to Gioachino Rossini at the Théâtre des Italiens, and was on a later visit to Paris an eyewitness to the Paris July Revolution of 1830.

After he completed his musical training with his uncle, Johann Nepomuk Hummel (who was married to his father's sister Elisabeth Röckel), he was music director in Bamberg starting in 1838. He lived in Vienna from 1839. For several years after 1840 he was conductor at the Weimar Court Theatre, where he composed his opera Farinelli. In 1843 he came to Dresden, where he was at the Court Theatre, where Richard Wagner was music director. He was assistant conductor ("2. Musikdirektor") to Wagner for five years until 1848. Influenced by the music of Wagner, he renounced a performance of his own opera, which he had sent to Dresden. Wagner became a close friend, especially during the time of 1849 Dresden uprising, and the two would go on long walks together.

Röckel was an ardent republican; he became friends with the likes of Mikhail Bakunin and was the editor of the revolutionary journal in Dresden, Volksblätter, to which Wagner also contributed. After the uprising failed, Röckel was captured along with Bakunin and sentenced to death, while Wagner escaped to Zürich. The death sentences were later commuted to prison terms. While Bakunin was handed over to Russia, Röckel served a thirteen-year sentence in solitary confinement at the Königstein Fortress and at Waldheim Prison, and was only released in January 1862, the last of the May insurgents to be freed.

While in custody, he received many letters from Wagner, in which Wagner made insightful statements on his opera cycle Der Ring des Nibelungen, which give valuable background to the revolutionary and socially critical nature of Wagner's magnum opus. During detention Röckel wrote his book The Saxon Revolt and the Waldheim Penitentiary. In 1862 in Biebrich, he once more met Wagner, who at that time was living there and writing Die Meistersinger von Nürnberg. However Wagner later quarrelled with Röckel when, in the late 1860s, he believed that the latter had been gossiping about his relationship with Cosima von Bülow.

Röckel lived in Frankfurt from 1863. In 1866, he moved to Munich and later to Vienna. In 1871, he suffered a stroke from which he never recovered. He died after a long illness at his son's house in Budapest.
