= ClassicaLoid =

Japanese anime television series

- Key visual

クラシカロイド (Kurashikaroido)
- Genre: Comedy, reverse harem
- Anime television series
- Directed by: Yoichi Fujita
- Written by: Miya Asakawa; Tsuyoshi Kida; Kyo Kogure; Shū Matsubara
- Music by: Masashi Hamauzu; Daisuke Asakura; Tomoyasu Hotei; tofubeats; Tsunku
- Studio: Sunrise (S1); BN Pictures (S2)
- Licensed by: AUS: Madman Entertainment (Season 1 only); NA: Sentai Filmworks
- Original network: NHK E
- Original run: October 8, 2016 – March 24, 2018
- Episodes: 50

ClassicaLoid (クラシカロイド, Kurashikaroido) is a 2016 Japanese musical comedy anime television series produced by BN Pictures and NHK. The series premiered on October 8, 2016, on NHK E, and aired until April 1, 2017. A second season began airing on October 7, 2017, and aired until March 24, 2018.

== Plot ==
High school students Kanae Otowa and Sōsuke Kagura live in a rural town that is attempting to reinvigorate itself with music. One day, ClassicaLoids of Beethoven and Mozart appear before them and play music they call Musik, which Otowa and Kagura soon discover is a power that causes strange phenomena. Soon after, ClassicaLoids of Chopin, Bach, Schubert, and other famous composers begin to appear. The power that the ClassicaLoids hold and their origins are a mystery that Otowa and Kagura seek to uncover.

== Characters ==
Beethoven
Voiced by: Tomokazu Sugita
Mozart
Voiced by: Yuki Kaji
Kanae Otowa (音羽歌苗, Otowa Kanae)
Voiced by: Mikako Komatsu
Sōsuke Kagura (神楽奏助, Kagura Sōsuke)
Voiced by: Nobunaga Shimazaki
Chopin
Voiced by: Kōsuke Toriumi
Liszt
Voiced by: Mamiko Noto
Schubert
Voiced by: Tomoaki Maeno
Bach
Voiced by: Taiten Kusunoki
Tchaikovsky
Voiced by: Aya Endō
Bądarzewska
Voiced by: M.A.O
Pad-kun
Voiced by: Akira Ishida
Richard Wagner
Voiced by: Yoshitsugu Matsuoka
Antonín Dvořák
Voiced by: Junichi Suwabe

== Media ==
=== Anime ===
The anime began airing on October 8, 2016, on NHK E. In North America, Sentai Filmworks acquired the license for the series and simulcasted it on Hulu, Anime Network and Crunchyroll. In Australia and New Zealand, the series was simulcasted on AnimeLab. A second season began airing on October 7, 2017, and was simulcasted in North America and other regions on Hidive.

=== Episode list ===
==== Season one ====
No.	Title (Note: All English titles are taken from Crunchyroll.)	Original release date
1	"Beethes and Motes and Otowakan"; Transliteration: "Beto to Motsu to Otowakan" (Japanese: ベトとモツと音羽館)	October 8, 2016
2	"Get It! Musik!"; Transliteration: "Dase! Mujīku" (Japanese: 出せ！ムジーク)	October 15, 2016
3	"Cho-chan and Lisz-chan!"; Transliteration: "Cho-chan to Ri-chan" (Japanese: チョッちゃんとリッちゃん)	October 22, 2016
4	"Wandering Kouhai"; Transliteration: "Samayoeru Kouhai" (Japanese: さまよえる後輩)	October 29, 2016
5	"Jet-Black Gyoza"; Transliteration: "Shikkoku no Gyōzā" (Japanese: 漆黒のギョーザー)	November 5, 2016
6	"The First ClassicaLoids"; Transliteration: "Hajimari no Kurashikaroido" (Japanese: 始まりのクラシカロイド)	November 12, 2016
7	"Mountain King"; Transliteration: "Yama no Ō" (Japanese: やまのおう)	November 19, 2016
8	"Girls' Day Out"; Transliteration: "Joshi Kai no Tsuitachi" (Japanese: 女子会の一日)	November 26, 2016
9	"Beyond the Darkness"; Transliteration: "Yami, Sono Mukō" (Japanese: 闇、その向こう)	December 3, 2016
10	"Jolly Love"; Transliteration: "Aishi no Jorī" (Japanese: 愛しのジョリー)	December 10, 2016
11	"At Least Do the Chores"; Transliteration: "Semete, Kaji Kurai" (Japanese: せめて、家事くらい)	December 17, 2016
12	"J.S. Bach"; Transliteration: "J S Bahha" (Japanese: J・S・バッハ)	December 24, 2016
13	"Die Forelle"; Transliteration: "Masu" (Japanese: ます)	January 7, 2017
14	"Claskey Klasky Breaks Up, Kanae Makes Her Debut"; Transliteration: "Kaisan Suru Kurakura, Debyū Suru Kanae" (Japanese: 解散するクラクラ、デビューする歌苗)	January 14, 2017
15	"School Festival from Hell"; Transliteration: "Jigoku no Gakuen Sai" (Japanese: 地獄の学園祭)	January 21, 2017
16	"Work! Beethes Motes"; Transliteration: "Hatarake! Beto Motsu" (Japanese: 働け！ベト モツ)	January 28, 2017
17	"Mandarins! Mandarins! Fried Mandarins?!"; Transliteration: "Mikan! Mikan! Yaki Mikan?!" (Japanese: みかん！みかん！焼きみかん？！)	February 4, 2017
18	"MitsuruLoid and Gyouna-kun"; Transliteration: "Mitsururoido to Gyouna-kun" (Japanese: ミツルロイドとギョウナくん)	February 11, 2017
19	"Love, and You Shall Die"; Transliteration: "Koisure ba Shisu" (Japanese: 恋すれば死す)	February 18, 2017
20	"Mozart is the Name"; Transliteration: "Sono Na wa Mōtsaruto" (Japanese: その名はモーツァルト)	February 25, 2017
21	"Breakthrough"; Transliteration: "Bureikusurū" (Japanese: ブレイク・スルー)	March 4, 2017
22	"A Discerning Man"; Transliteration: "Chigai no Wakaru o Toko" (Japanese: ちがいのわかるおとこ)	March 11, 2017
23	"The World of Eight Sounds: Part 1"; Transliteration: "Hachi Oto no Sekai: Zenpen" (Japanese: 八音の世界・前編)	March 18, 2017
24	"The World of Eight Sounds: Part 2"; Transliteration: "Hachi Oto no Sekai" (Japanese: 八音の世界)	March 25, 2017
25	"Encore from the Skies"; Transliteration: "Sora Kara no Ankōru" (Japanese: 宇宙(そら)そらからのアンコール)	April 1, 2017

==== Season two ====
No. overall	No. in season	Title	Original release date
26	1	"1 Hippo and Little Brother and Otowa Mansion" (Japanese: カバと弟と音羽館)	October 7, 2017
27	2	"My Little Brother" (Japanese: マイリトルブラザー)	October 14, 2017
28	3	"Ever Since the Day We First Met" (Japanese: ひと目会ったその日から)	October 21, 2017
29	4	"Fever! Let's Pugi!" (Japanese: フィーバー！レッツぷーぎー！)	October 28, 2017
30	5	"A Great Man" (Japanese: 偉大なる男)	November 4, 2017
31	6	"Mother Provides the Crab, Hippo Becomes a Rhino" (Japanese: ハハはカニ カバはサイ)	November 11, 2017
32	7	"Looking for a Husband for Kanae" (Japanese: 歌苗、お婿さん募集中)	November 18, 2017
33	8	"To Be Motz Is to Fib" (Japanese: ウソつきはモツのはじまり)	November 25, 2017
34	9	"A World Without Circles" (Japanese: ○(まる)のない世界)	December 2, 2017
35	10	"Liszt vs Liszt, Bell of Destiny" (Japanese: リストvs.リスト 運命の鐘(ゴング))	December 9, 2017
36	11	"Nothing But Saltiness" (Japanese: 塩しかねんだよ)	December 16, 2017
37	12	"Wagner's Ambition" (Japanese: ワーグナーの野望)	December 23, 2017
38	13	"Forget The Years Hardships! Red vs White Musik Contest" (Japanese: 年忘れ！紅白ムジーク合戦)	December 30, 2017
39	14	"Fall in Love, Pop Idol! Travel Pygmy Hippo!" (Japanese: 恋せよアイドル、旅せよコビトカバ)	January 6, 2018
40	15	"Dosukoi! Otowa Sumo Stable" (Japanese: どすこい音羽部屋)	January 13, 2018
41	16	"A Reunion With The Great Unknown" (Japanese: 未知との再会)	January 20, 2018
42	17	"WesternLoids Of The Wild West" (Japanese: 荒野のウエスタンロイド)	January 27, 2018
43	18	"Goodbye Big Sister" (Japanese: さよなら、姉さん)	February 3, 2018
44	19	"The Melancholy of Schubert" (Japanese: シューベルトの憂鬱(ゆううつ))	February 10, 2018
45	20	"The Melancholy of Dovo-chan" (Japanese: ドボちゃんの憂鬱(ゆううつ))	February 17, 2018
46	21	"Chopin the Hero" (Japanese: 英雄ショパン)	February 24, 2018
47	22	"Bach, CLAKLA, Nibelungen" (Japanese: バッハクラクラニーベルング)	March 3, 2018
48	23	"A Long Awaited Person Arrives, A Castle is Built" (Japanese: 待ち人来たりて城が建つ)	March 10, 2018
49	24	"Big Sister and Little Brother" (Japanese: 姉と弟)	March 17, 2018
50	25	"The Last ClassicaLoid" (Japanese: ザ ラスト クラシカロイド)	March 24, 2018

== Production ==
The series was announced in July 2015 as a collaboration between Sunrise and NHK. It is animated by Sunrise, directed by Yoichi Fujita, and written by Miya Asakawa, Tsuyoshi Kida, Kyo Kogure, and Shū Matsubara, with Ichirō Sakaki and Michihiro Tsuchiya handling series composition. It features original character designs by Makoto Tsuchibayashi, adapted character designs by Seiichi Hashimoto, music by Masashi Hamauzu, and musical renditions by Daisuke Asakura, Tomoyasu Hotei, tofubeats and Tsunku for Liszt, Beethoven, Mozart and Bach, respectively. NHK and BN Pictures are the series' producers.
