= Tekla Bądarzewska-Baranowska =

Polish composer

Tekla Bądarzewska
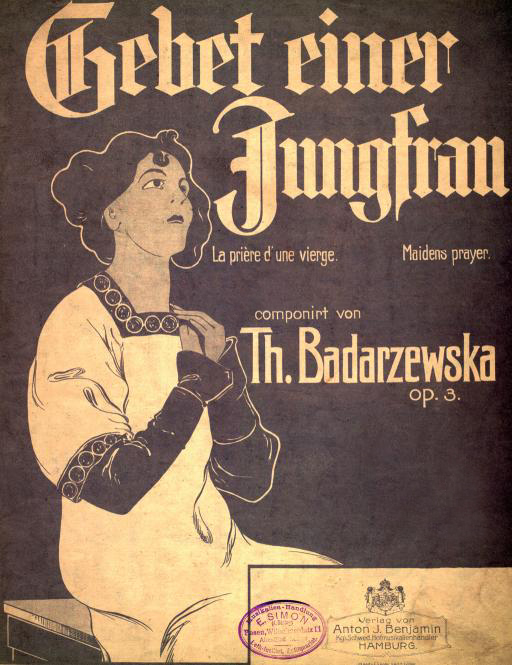
- Cover of the "Maiden's Prayer" by Tekla Bądarzewska
- Born: 1829/1834; Mława, Russian Empire
- Died: 29 September 1861 (aged 27 or 32); Warsaw, Russian Empire
- Occupations: Composer; pianist
- Known for: A Maiden's Prayer

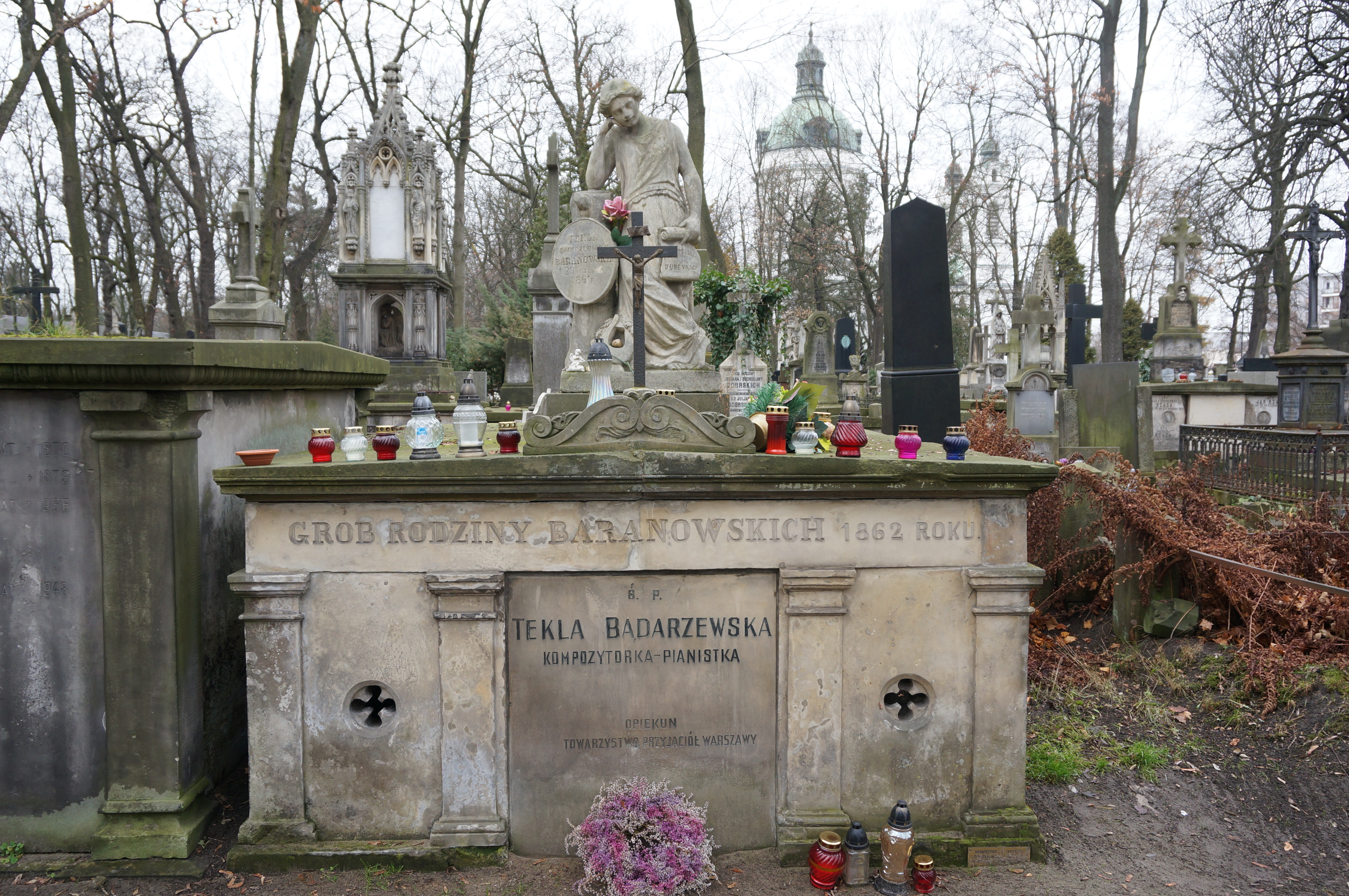
Grave of Tekla Bądarzewska-Baranowska in the Baranowski family tomb, Powązki Cemetery, Warsaw

Tekla Bądarzewska-Baranowska, also known as Tekla Bądarzewska (Polish pronunciation: [ˈtɛkla bɔndaˈʐɛfska]; 1829/1834 – 29 September 1861) was a Polish composer and pianist. She composed mainly for the piano and is internationally known for her composition A Maiden's Prayer.

== Life and death ==
Bądarzewska was born in 1829 in Mława or 1834 in Warsaw to Andrzej Bądarzewski and Tekla Bądarzewska (Chrzanowska). Andrzej Bądarzewski was a successful police commissioner, and moved his family to Warsaw in 1835. Tekla married Jan Baranowski and they had five children in their nine years of marriage. Bądarzewska-Baranowska died on 29 September 1861 in Warsaw. One of her daughters, Bronisława, was enrolled at the Warsaw Institute of Music in 1875.

== Early works and marriage ==
At age 14, Bądarzewska composed and published her first piece, Vals Pour le Pianoforte, dedicated to Anna Makiewicz, the benefactress of a local orphanage. This piece was published by Franciszek Henryk Spiess, an important bookseller at the time.

Four years after the publication of her Vals, Bądarzewska married Jan Baranowski, an army captain. In 1857, the Czarist authorities gave Baranowski the Order of St. Stanislaus (Russian Empire) third class. Later, in 1863, Baranowski was transferred to Tashkent, leaving Bądarzewska alone with their 5 children.

== A Maiden's Prayer ==
Bądarzewska wrote about 35 small compositions for piano; by far her most famous composition is the piece Modlitwa dziewicy, Op. 4 ("A Maiden's Prayer", French: La prière d'une vierge), which was published in 1856 in Warsaw, and then as a supplement to the Revue et gazette musicale de Paris in 1859.

Several musical scholars have spoken somewhat ill of Bądarzewska's musical career. Percy Scholes writes of Bądarzewska in The Oxford Companion to Music (9th edition, reprinted 1967): "Born in Warsaw in 1838 [sic] and died there in 1861, aged twenty-three [sic]. In this brief lifetime she accomplished, perhaps, more than any composer who ever lived, for she provided the piano of absolutely every tasteless sentimental person in the so-called civilised world with a piece of music which that person, however unaccomplished in a dull technical sense, could play. It is probable that if the market stalls and back-street music shops of Britain were to be searched The Maiden's Prayer would be found to be still selling, and as for the Empire at large, Messrs. Allen of Melbourne reported in 1924, sixty years after the death of the composer, that their house alone was still disposing of 10,000 copies a year."

"A Maiden's Prayer"

The composition is a short piano piece for intermediate pianists. Some have liked it for its charming and romantic melody, and others have described it as "sentimental salon tosh." The pianist and academic Arthur Loesser described it as a "dowdy product of ineptitude."

The American musician Bob Wills arranged the piece in the Western swing style and wrote lyrics for it. He first recorded it in 1935 as "Maiden's Prayer". Later, it became a standard recorded by many country artists. It is also played on certain garbage trucks in Taiwan.

In the 1930 opera Rise and Fall of the City of Mahagonny by Kurt Weill and Bertolt Brecht, scene 9 in act 1 is satirically based on a pianistic paraphrase of the piece, whose theme is quoted by the men's chorus later in the following ensemble.

== In popular culture ==
In 2016, she appeared as one half of a pop idol duo with Pyotr Ilyich Tchaikovsky in an anime series, Classicaloid. She was portrayed by Mao Ichimichi.

== Remembrance ==
- In 1991, a crater on Venus was named Badarzewska by the International Astronomical Union (IAU) in honour of the Polish composer.
- In 2007, an album produced by Yukihisa Miyayama containing collected compositions by Bądarzewska was released for the first time in Japan.
- In 2008, the composer was the main protagonist of a Prix Italia-winning documentary by Dorota Halasa and Katarzyna Michalak.
- In 2010, a square in the Warsaw district of Muranów was named in remembrance of Bądarzewska. It is located at 13 Anders Street.
- In 2012, the Tekla Bądarzewska Society (Polish: Towarzystwo Miłośników Twórczości Tekli Bądarzewskiej) was established in the composer's hometown of Mława with the aim of preserving and promoting the music legacy of Bądarzewska.
- In 2012, thanks to the efforts of the Warsaw's Friends Society (Polish: Towarzystwo Przyjaciół Warszawy) the first Polish album with Bądarzewska's works titled Zapomniany dźwięk (The Forgotten Sound) was released.
- In 2012, a book by Beata Michalec entitled Tekla z Bądarzewskich Baranowska, autorka nieśmiertelnej La prière d’une vierge – Miejsca, czas i ludzie (Tekla Bądarzewska-Baranowska, the Author of the Immortal La prière d’une vierge: Places, Time and People) was published.
- Bądarzewska's grave at the Powązki Cemetery has been decorated with a figure of a woman holding a roll of sheet music with an inscription in French La prière d’une vierge (A Maiden's Prayer).

== See also ==
- Music of Poland
- List of Polish composers
