= Choon Paan =

Sri Lankan mobile bread vendor

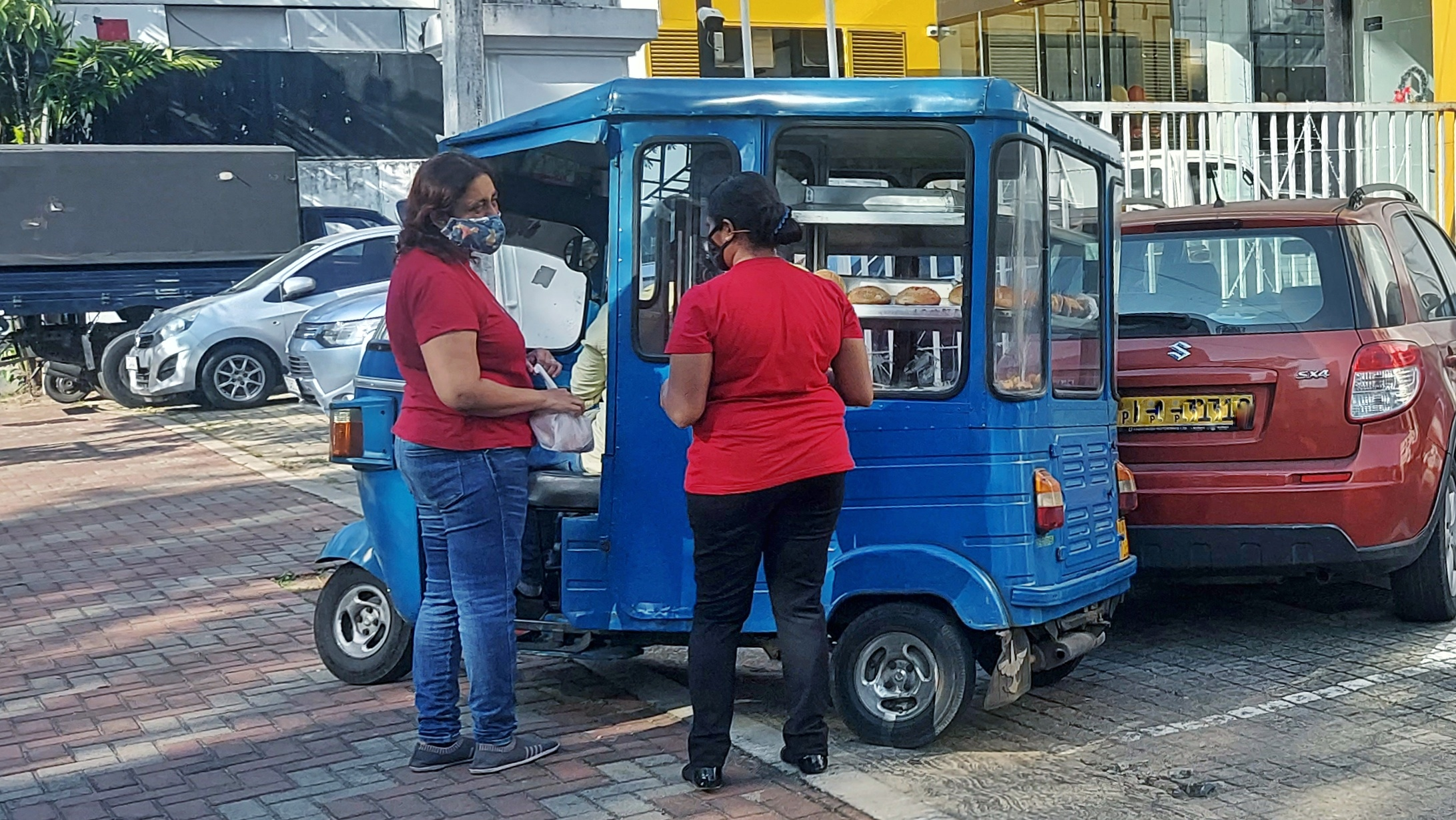
A mobile bread vendor in Colombo

Choon Paan is a typical Sri Lankan mobile bread vendor. The choon paan delivery is incorporated with a style of Beethoven music while selling the bakery items, mostly bread items, to customers on streets and also at the doorsteps of the customers. The choon paan delivery became popular among Sri Lankans and also among foreign tourists during their visits to Sri Lanka.

== Meaning ==
Choon Paan is a Sinhalese word which depicts the meaning of a music bread.

== History ==
The origins of the choon paan concept date back to the early 2000s, as it was during that point of time, the trend of tuk tuk vehicles slowly began in Sri Lanka. Coinciding with the growing popularity of tuk tuk vehicles in Sri Lanka during the early 2000s, bakers in Sri Lanka implemented a paradigm shift approach by using tuk tuk vehicles to transport and deliver the bakery items. The choon paan vehicles had been operating with a recorded music tune which was extracted from the German veteran music composer Ludwig van Beethoven's musical composition of Für Elise. The tuk tuk drivers acknowledged that the Beethoven’s musical rendition Für Elise had been rated as one of the most popular ringtones during early 2000s and they decided to capitalise on the trend by including the musical tune while selling baked items to customers.

Choon Paan tuk tuk vehicles have become an integral part of everyday life in Sri Lankan context and the vehicles have been operating across all parts of Sri Lanka. Choon Paan over the years, has also cemented a sentimental element in the lives of Sri Lankans for facilitating a convenient method of purchasing short eats and bakery household items at affordable prices. Choon Paan had been engaged in selling various food items, including sugar-coated kimbula bun, maalu paan (fish bun), tea bun, elawalu rotti (vegetable rotti), ulundu vadai. Choon Paan delivery vehicles, frequently in the form of the three-wheelers and also in the form of lorries have been designed with the attribute of a glass display cabinet to arrange the baked goods in an orderly manner.

However, the operation of the choon paan trucks and choon paan three-wheelers slowly began to decline in Sri Lanka with the change in mindset of Sri Lankans as a majority of the Sri Lankans opted for food delivery and home delivery apps such as Uber Eats, PickMe which significantly diminished the choon paan delivery service. Such demographic changes also hampered the livelihoods of choon paan delivery drivers whose revenue streams took a massive dent as people began to order foods through online platforms. In 2017, the Sri Lankan government imposed a ban on the usage of loud music by the choon paan vehicles, and the government instructed choon paan drivers to emit sound above a certain decibel level.

The slowly diminishing choon paan delivery service was eventually brought back to the fore and was revived during the onset of the COVID-19 pandemic in Sri Lanka in March 2020, when the Sri Lankan government announced to close the restaurants, bakeries, and all “non-essential” businesses, while the government allowed the operation of choon paan vehicles, labelling it as an essential service.
