= Therese Malfatti =

Austrian musician; close friend of Ludwig van Beethoven

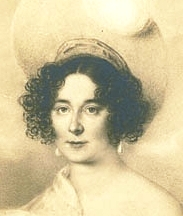
- Born: 1 January 1792; Vienna, Archduchy of Austria
- Died: 27 April 1851 (aged 59); Vienna, Austrian Empire
- Occupation: Musician
- Known for: Potential dedicatee of "Für Elise"
- Relatives: Johann Baptist Malfatti von Monteregio (cousin)

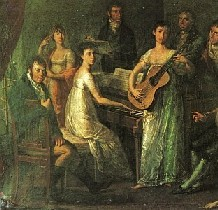
Therese Malfatti at the piano surrounded by her family, circa 1810

Baroness Therese von Droßdik (née Malfatti; 1 January 1792 – 27 April 1851) was an Austrian musician and a close friend of Ludwig van Beethoven. She is best known as the potential dedicatee of Beethoven's famous bagatelle "Für Elise", WoO 59.

== Biography ==
Malfatti was born in Vienna on 1 January 1792. She was the daughter of the Viennese-Saxon merchant Jacob Friedrich Malfatti (1769–1829, since 1785 Jacob Friedrich Malfatti von Rohrenbach zu Dezza) and a cousin of the famous and wealthy physician, Johann Baptist Malfatti von Monteregio (1775–1859). Her father, who since 1804 owned an estate in Walkersdorf am Kamp (Grafenegg), was ennobled on 2 April 1806 and given the title "Edler von Rohrenbach zu Dezza".

Her younger sister Anna (1792–1869) married Beethoven's friend Ignaz von Gleichenstein on 29 May 1811 in Etsdorf am Kamp (Grafenegg). Therese was "the object of Beethoven's affection and marriage-project in the year 1810".

In April or May 1810, Beethoven wrote to Therese a letter which ended:

Now fare you well, respected Therese. I wish you all the good and beautiful things of this life. Bear me in memory—no one can wish you a brighter, happier life than I—even should it be that you care not at all for your devoted servant and friend, Beethoven.

This was not exactly a love-letter, and it is not certain that Beethoven ever proposed marriage to Therese Malfatti, though some believe that he did. Further, the bagatelle "Für Elise", a piece possibly written for Therese, was found among her personal papers.

Baroness Droßdik died in Vienna in 1851.
