= Waldheim Prison =

German prison

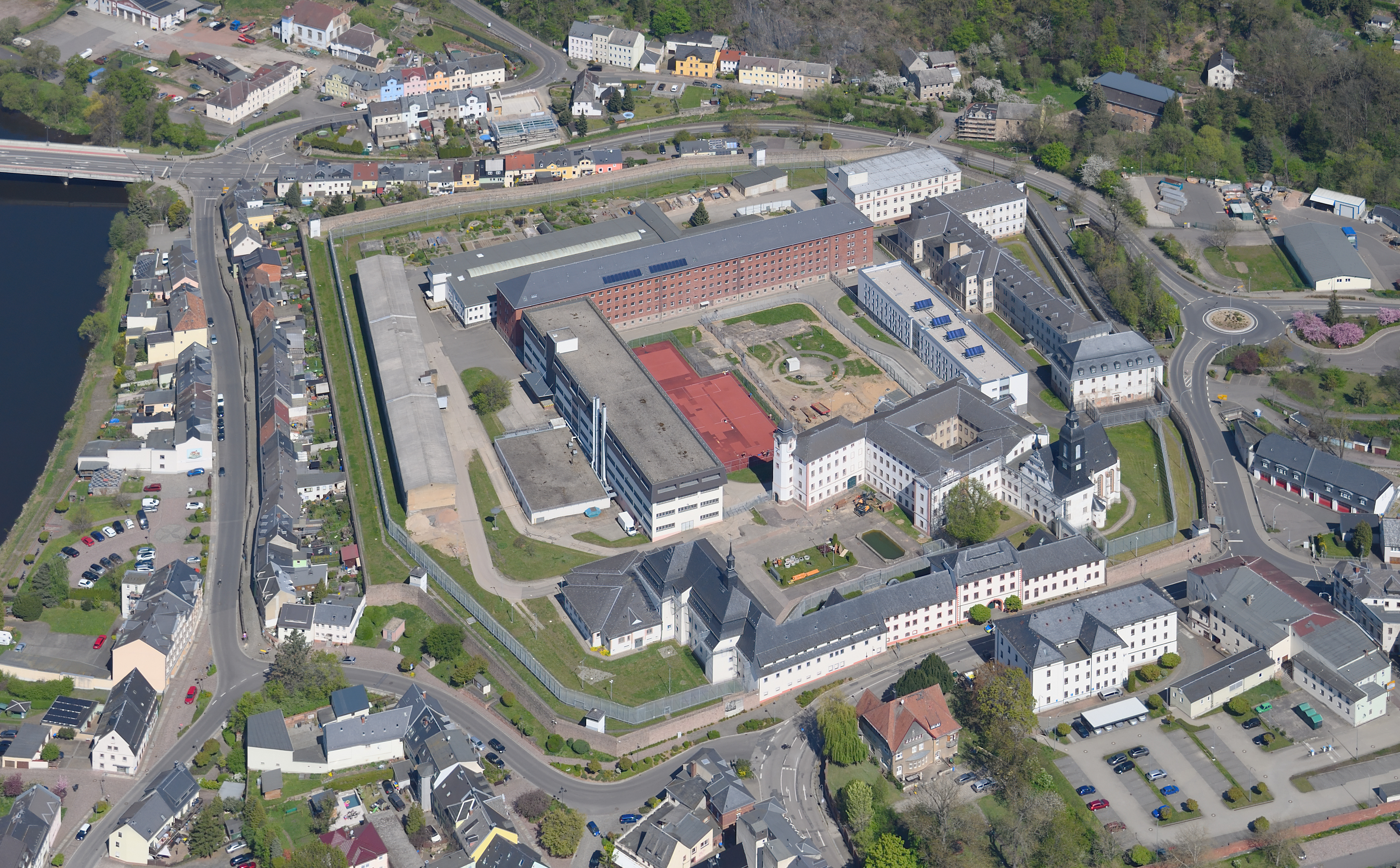
- April 2025 aerial view from the SW
- Interactive map of Waldheim Prison
- Location: Waldheim, Saxony, Germany
- Opened: April 3, 1716

Waldheim Prison is a 310-year-old federal prison in Waldheim, Saxony, Germany.

== Use ==
As of April 2016, the Waldheim penal institution held 373 men (aged 21–80) out of a capacity of almost 400. The Saxon Minister of Justice, Sebastian Gemkow, described the focus as "humane enforcement".

== History ==
Originally an old castle, the penitentiary in Waldheim, Saxony opened on 3 April 1716. Founded by Augustus II the Strong, elector of Saxony, the prison was initially focused on welfare and rehabilitation and housed beggars, highwaymen, and criminals (with the latter only accounting for 20% of inmates). A model for other such institutions, by the turn of the 19th century, envoys traveled from other European states to see the prison. After being stripped of its welfare roles in 1830, the prison became notorious for the atrocious treatment of inmates. In 1870, Waldheim was the first prison to install a mental ward.

Waldheim was used to hold political prisoners: before World War II, for the Nazi Party, and the East German state. Some famous prisoners included Karl May, August Röckel, and Horst Sindermann. The 1950 Waldheim Trials imprisoned thousands of Nazi suspects and executed 24. In April 2016, a ceremony was held to celebrate the building's 300th anniversary, the oldest German prison still in use.
