= Bagatelle (music) =

Short piece of music for the piano

A bagatelle is a short piece of music, typically for the piano, and usually of a light, mellow character. The word bagatelle comes from the French, and in English originally meant "a thing of no value or importance, a trifle", but later took on in addition the more specific sense of "a piece of verse, dance, or music composed in a light style or on a small scale". Although bagatelles are perhaps most commonly written for solo piano, they have also been written for piano four hands, harpsichord, harp, organ, classical guitar, vibraphone, unaccompanied oboe, clarinet, violin, viola, various chamber-music configurations, orchestra, band, voice and piano, and a cappella choir.

== Earliest known bagatelle ==
The earliest use of the name "bagatelle" for a musical work was by François Couperin, in his tenth harpsichord ordre (1717), in which a rondeau is titled "Les bagatelles".

== Best-known bagatelles ==
The best-known bagatelles are probably those by Ludwig van Beethoven, who published three sets, Opp. 33, 119 and 126, and wrote a number of similar works that were unpublished in his lifetime, including the piece that is popularly known as Für Elise. Other notable examples are Franz Liszt's Bagatelle sans tonalité (an early exploration into atonality); a set for violin and piano (Op. 13) by François Schubert of which No. 9, The Bee, is often performed; the set by Antonín Dvořák for two violins, cello and harmonium (Op. 47); and sets by Bedřich Smetana, Alexander Tcherepnin and Jean Sibelius. Anton Diabelli also wrote a bagatelle in a short, happy form. Mauro Giuliani wrote ten for guitar in his Bagattelle per la chitarra, Op. 73. Camille Saint-Saëns wrote Six Bagatelles, Op. 3, and Friedrich Baumfelder also wrote one bagatelle, Op. 386, in his later years.

In the 20th century, several composers have written sets of bagatelles, including Béla Bartók, who wrote a set of fourteen (Op. 6); Anton Webern, who wrote a set of six for string quartet (Op. 9); Gerald Finzi, who wrote Five Bagatelles for clarinet and piano; and Alan Hovhaness, who wrote Four Bagatelles for string quartet (Op. 30). Another canonical modern bagatelle is the set by György Ligeti, who originally composed a set of eleven short works for piano entitled Musica Ricercata (1951–53), and later arranged a selection of them as Six Bagatelles for Wind Quintet (1953).

The Northern Irish composer Howard Ferguson wrote a set of Five Bagatelles for piano (Op. 9), which, along with his Piano Sonata in F minor, are among the composer's few regularly performed works. William Walton also wrote Five Bagatelles for the classical guitar for Julian Bream dedicated to composer Malcolm Arnold around 1970. These five pieces have been recorded by several eminent classical guitarists including Julian Bream, Sharon Isbin, Christopher Parkening and Ana Vidović. The American composer Charles Wuorinen wrote a Bagatelle for solo piano, which he later orchestrated. The Australian composer Carl Vine also wrote Five Bagatelles for piano (1994), which are quite frequently performed at piano competitions, especially in Australia. Peruvian composer Jorge Villavicencio Grossmann also wrote Cinco Bagatelas Opacas y Traslucidas for violin and piano (also existing in a trio version with bass clarinet). In 2006 the American composer Allen Shearer wrote Bagatelles (a set of seven) for flute and clarinet, and in 2015 John Zorn composed a book of 300 Bagatelles for open instrumentation that were premiered that same year by Sylvie Courvoisier, Mark Feldman, John Medeski, Craig Taborn, Uri Caine, Jamie Saft, Marc Ribot, Gyan Riley, Julian Lage, Erik Friedlander, Peter Evans, Jon Irabagon, Jim Black and Ikue Mori among others.
