= Bagatelle (TV series) =

Canadian children's television series

- Genre: Children's television
- Country of origin: Canada
- Original language: English
- No. of seasons: 1

Production
- Running time: 30 minutes

Original release
- Network: CBC Television
- Release: 5 April – 6 September 1974

Bagatelle is a Canadian children's television series that aired on CBC Television in 1974.

== Premise ==
This series is geared towards children before age 10. The first part of each episode, Au jardin de Pierrot, features francophone folk songs for young children as hosted by Pierrette Boucher. This segment is set in a playground. It was produced by Maurice Falardeau at Radio-Canada. The programme concludes with a short Canadian-produced film from a studio such as Communicalp Film Productions (Vancouver), Moreland Latchford, Nelvana and the Visual Education Centre.

== Scheduling ==
This half-hour series was broadcast Fridays at 4:30 p.m. from 5 April to 6 September 1974.
