= Neunburg vorm Wald =

- Town
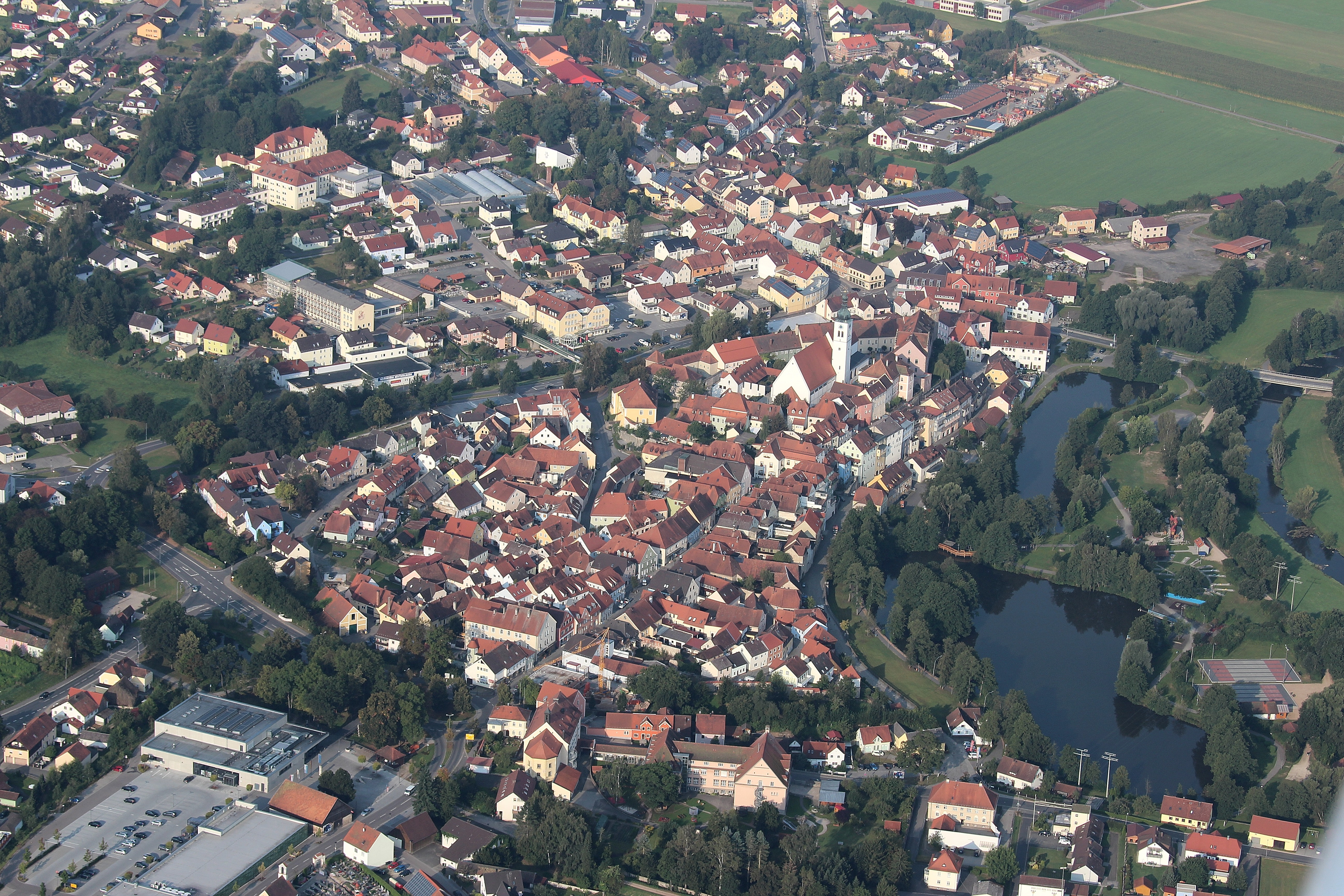
- Neunburg vorm Wald Aerial view

- Coat of arms

- Location of Neunburg vorm Wald within Schwandorf district
- Interactive map of Neunburg vorm Wald
- Location within Germany Location within Bavaria
- Coordinates: 49°20′N 12°23′E
- Country: Germany
- State: Bavaria
- Admin. region: Oberpfalz
- District: Schwandorf
- Subdivisions: 8 Ortsteile

Government
  - Mayor (2020–26): Martin Birner (CSU)

Area
  - Total: 110.14 km^{2} (42.53 sq mi)
- Elevation: 398 m (1,306 ft)

Population (2025-12-31)
  - Total: 8,155
  - Density: 74.04/km^{2} (191.8/sq mi)
- Time zone: UTC+01:00 (CET)
  - Summer (DST): UTC+02:00 (CEST)
- Postal codes: 92431
- Dialling codes: 0 96 72
- Vehicle registration: SAD
- Website: www.neunburgvormwald.de

Neunburg vorm Wald (German pronunciation: [ˈnɔʏnbʊʁk foːɐ̯m ˈvalt], lit. 'Neunburg before the Forest') is a town in the district of Schwandorf, in Bavaria, Germany. It is situated 21 km east of Schwandorf on the river Schwarzach, a tributary of the Naab.

== Mayor ==
The mayor is Martin Birner (CSU). He was elected in 2014 with 77,98 % of the votes, and re-elected in 2020.

== Population development ==
Population development (with incorporations):

Year	1840	1871	1900	1925	1939	1950	1961	1970	1987	2015
Inhabitants	6174	6254	5860	5885	5900	7790	6828	7825	7215	8233

== Sons and daughters of the town ==
- Johann Agricola (1590-1668), physician, alchemist and saline expert
- Elisabeth Röckel (1793-1883), opera singer, wife of Johann Nepomuk Hummel
- Gregor von Scherr (1804-1877), Archbishop of Munich and Freising, name giver for the local school
