= Bagatelle (literary technique) =

A bagatelle is a short literary piece in light style. Definitions of the term vary, with bagatelle referring to a variety of forms, while generally considered an unimportant or insignificant thing or trifle.

== Definitions ==
=== The American Heritage Dictionary of the English Language, 4th Edition ===
- n. An unimportant or insignificant thing; a trifle.
- n. A short, light piece of verse or music.
- n. A game played on an oblong table with a cue and balls.

=== Wiktionary, Creative Commons Attribution/Share-Alike License ===
- n. A trifle; an unsubstantial thing.
- n. A short piece of literature or of instrumental music, typically light or playful in character.
- n. A game similar to billiards played on an oblong table with pockets or arches at one end only.
- n. Any of several smaller, wooden table top games developed from the original bagatelle in which the pockets are made of pins; also called pin bagatelle, hit-a-pin bagatelle, jaw ball.

=== GNU version of the Collaborative International Dictionary of English ===
- n. A trifle; a thing of no importance.
- n. A game played on an oblong board, having, at one end, cups or arches into or through which balls are to be driven by a rod held in the hand of the player.

=== The Century Dictionary and Cyclopedia ===
- n. A trifle; a thing of no importance.
- n. A game played on a table having at one end nine holes, into which balls are to be struck with a billiard-cue.
- n. Specifically, in music, a short and light piece, usually for the piano.

=== WordNet 3.0 (2006) by Princeton University ===
- n. something of little value or significance
- n. a table game in which short cues are used to knock balls into holes that are guarded by wooden pegs; penalties are incurred if the pegs are knocked over
- n. a light piece of music for piano

== Etymologies ==
French, from Italian bagatella, diminutive of dialectal bagata, little property, possibly from Latin bāca, berry (American Heritage Dictionary of the English Language, Fourth Edition) From French bagatelle, from Italian bagattella. (Wiktionary)
