= Joseph August Röckel =

German singer and opera singer (1783–1870)

Joseph August Röckel (28 August 1783 – September 1870) was a German operatic tenor and opera producer. He played Florestan in the 1806 revival of Beethoven's opera Fidelio in Vienna, and later produced the opera for the first time in London.

== Life ==
Röckel was born in 1783 at Neunburg vorm Wald, in the Upper Palatinate. He was originally intended for the church, but in 1803 entered the diplomatic service of the Elector of Bavaria as Private Secretary to the Bavarian Chargé d'Affaires at Salzburg. On the recall of the Salzburg Legation in 1804, he accepted an engagement to sing at the Theater an der Wien in Vienna, where, on 29 March 1806, he appeared as Florestan in the revival of Beethoven's Fidelio.

In 1823 Röckel was appointed Professor of Singing at the Imperial Opera; in 1828 he undertook the direction of Aachen Opera, and in the following year made the bold experiment of producing German operas in Paris with a complete German company. Encouraged by the success of this venture, he remained in Paris until 1832, when he brought his company to London, and produced Fidelio, Der Freischütz, and other operas of the German school, at the King's Theatre; the principal artists being Wilhelmine Schröder-Devrient and Anton Haizinger, with Johann Nepomuk Hummel (Röckel's brother-in-law) as conductor.

In 1835 he retired from operatic life, and in 1853 finally returned to Germany, where he died, at Köthen, in September 1870.

The opera singer Elisabeth Röckel was his sister; the composer and conductor August Röckel was his son.
