= List of Strawberry Panic episodes =

Strawberry Panic is a Japanese anime series produced by the animation studio Madhouse and is a part of the media franchise Strawberry Panic! which brings many different types of media together in a single series. The anime aired in Japan between April 3, 2006, and September 25, 2006, and contained twenty-six episodes. These episodes were later split into nine separate DVDs, the first of which went on sale in Japan on June 23, 2006; it contained the first two episodes. The anime's central theme is yuri (lesbian relationships). The anime is based on the short stories and manga that preceded it.

Media Blasters released four English-subtitled DVDs of Strawberry Panic between March 4 and September 2, 2008; a fifth and final DVD was released in November 2008. All English-subtitled DVDs contain five episodes, except for its first release, which contains six. The series premiered on Toku in the United States on December 31, 2015.

== Episode list ==
No.	Title	Original release date
1	"Cherry Blossom Hill"; Transliteration: "Sakura no Oka" (Japanese: 櫻の丘)	April 3, 2006
Nagisa Aoi transfers to St. Miator Girl's Academy and gets acquainted with the school and fellow students, including Tamao Suzumi, her friendly (if somewhat overbearing) roommate, Miyuki Rokujou, the Miator student council president, and Shizuma Hanazono, the Etoile, whom Nagisa finds beautiful and intriguing but also frustrating and perplexing due to her forwardness in her advances.
2	"Etoile"; Transliteration: "Etowāru" (Japanese: エトワール)	April 10, 2006
Tamao invites Nagisa to the Literature Club where she recites a poem she wrote about a rainbow. Shizuma misses an important lunch discussion. Nagisa and Shizuma have a couple chance encounters; Nagisa runs into Shizuma in a hallway where Shizuma flirts with and attempts to kiss her before being interrupted by the toll of a bell, and Nagisa later finds Shizuma with a young Miator student. After the latter event, Nagisa retreats to the library, and Shizuma follows, catching her and again attempting to kiss her before being interrupted. The Miator student council president scolds Shizuma for her behavior toward the new transfer student and for shirking her responsibilities as Etoile, but Shizuma brushes it off.
3	"Attic"; Transliteration: "Yaneura" (Japanese: 屋根裏)	April 17, 2006
Nagisa is shown around the Strawberry Dorms by Tamao and two of their classmates, during which time Nagisa is surprised by Shizuma yet again, who continues to make advances; Nagisa realizes that she finds herself unable to move whenever Shizuma gazes at her. Shizuma retreats to avoid members of the student council. Later, Nagisa accidentally bursts into a student council presidents' meeting in the midst of an argument over the Etoile's continued absence. Lulim's student council president, Chikaru Minamoto, tells Nagisa that her interruption was a relief because it ended the argument regarding Shizuma's absence early. She explains some responsibilities of the Etoile that Shizuma is shirking as well as some major differences between the three schools, explaining arguments between the other student council presidents. Nagisa admires Chikaru, and wonders why Shizuma is shirking her responsibilities. She resolves to make sure Shizuma attends the welcoming event for new first-year boarding students. After much searching, she finds Shizuma and convinces her to attend the event.
4	"The White Horse's Master"; Transliteration: "Hakuba no Kimi" (Japanese: 白馬の君)	April 24, 2006
Hikari recalls being transferred to Spica a year prior and the first time she saw Amane riding her horse, thinking she was like an angel. Hikari and Yaya, her friend and roommate, sing in the St. Spica choir and practice for the congratulatory ceremony for the return of Amane and the rest of the horseback-riding team. Hikari, who is extremely nervous for the event, prays alone at a fountain for a good performance. She and other Spica students gather to see Amane's return, at which time the Etoile presents Amane with a bouquet of roses for her accomplishments. At the ceremony, during the choir performance, Hikari accidentally starts singing early due to her nervousness, and becomes embarrassed. Amane stands to quiet the room and the performance progresses without Hikari's participation; she is extremely disappointed in herself. Meanwhile, the Spica student council president discusses the upcoming selection for a new Etoile with two of her peers, and expresses her desire for Amane to represent Spica, despite her not being interested. Hikari tells Yaya that she wants to quit the choir team because she is so disappointed in herself. Early the next morning, Hikari goes out to the fountain again and thinks about Amane and ends up at the horse range and sings. She is surprised when Amane appears on her horse; they chat and Amane gives Hikari a pep-talk. Amane takes Hikari back to her dorm and asks if she can hear her sing again sometime. Hikari decides to stay in the choir.
5	"Younger Sisters"; Transliteration: "Imōtotachi" (Japanese: 妹たち)	May 1, 2006
Select first years attending Miator become room-temps for older students. One such student, Chiyo, becomes the room-temp for Nagisa and Tamao.
6	"Greenhouse"; Transliteration: "Onshitsu" (Japanese: 温室)	May 8, 2006
Nagisa tries to find a club she would like to join, but she's not interested in any of them. Later, she discovers the Etoile's private greenhouse and helps with the flowers.
7	"Thorny Trap"; Transliteration: "Ibara no Wana" (Japanese: 荊の罠)	May 15, 2006
As Hikari and Amane's relationship progresses, Shion tries to convince Amane to run for the position of Etoile in the next election. However, unknown to Shion, Kaname and Momomi work out a different plan involving Hikari.
8	"Hydrangeas"; Transliteration: "Ajisai" (Japanese: 紫陽花)	May 22, 2006
Nagisa offers her favorite umbrella to Kagome but does not give her name. Later, Kagome gets help from Chikaru and her friends, and they start to try to find out who gave Kagome the umbrella. Meanwhile, Tamao tries desperately to fulfill her fantasy of walking under an umbrella together with Nagisa.
9	"Memories"; Transliteration: "Kioku" (Japanese: 記憶)	May 29, 2006
The "Seven Mysteries" of the Strawberry Dorms are mentioned. Nagisa and Tamao start to investigate the first mystery: "The Girl of the Hallway", despite Nagisa's terrible fear of the supernatural.
10	"Private Lessons"; Transliteration: "Kojinkyōju" (Japanese: 個人教授)	June 5, 2006
Nagisa starts to prepare for the mid-year exams by getting tutored by Shizuma in French.
11	"Meteor Shower"; Transliteration: "Ryūseiu" (Japanese: 流星雨)	June 12, 2006
Nagisa, accompanied by most of her friends, go on a short trip to the beach during "summer school". While there, everyone finds their own ways of having fun with each other, and they even get to participate in a test of courage later on. Meanwhile, Nagisa is just starting to discover just how much she misses Shizuma.
12	"Summertime"; Transliteration: "Natsujikan" (Japanese: 夏時間)	June 19, 2006
The month-long summer holidays have started, and most of the students residing in the Strawberry Dorms are going home. This leaves Nagisa, Shizuma and a couple of others left behind. Without the interference of other students, Shizuma makes her move on Nagisa.
13	"The Roar of the Waves"; Transliteration: "Shiosai" (Japanese: 潮騒)	June 26, 2006
Hikari finally gets a chance to be on a "date" with Amane. However, Kaname and Momomi again try to tear apart the new bond between them for Spica's sake at the Etoile position. In the midsts of all this, Yaya's feelings for Hikari grow even stronger, and she eventually vents them by suddenly kissing a shocked Hikari.
14	"More Than Best Friends"; Transliteration: "Shinyū Ijō" (Japanese: 親友以上)	July 3, 2006
Yaya's incident with Hikari causes her to fear that she has lost Hikari forever. An effort by Nagisa and Tamao allows them a reconciliation and another chance at being best friends forever.
15	"Heroine"; Transliteration: "Hiroin" (Japanese: ヒロイン)	July 10, 2006
Everybody at the Strawberry Dorms is pitching in for the two plays in Astraea's Drama Festival. The main play, Carmen, is the focus of everyone's attention as everyone awaits the announcement of who is to be cast as the lead roles. The second play will be Romeo and Juliet, prompting a furious rock-paper-scissors and thumb war tournament between the second-years for the role of Romeo. Tamao is asked to write the script for the performance of Carmen.
16	"Behind the Scenes"; Transliteration: "Butaiura" (Japanese: 舞台裏)	July 17, 2006
While everyone is still preparing for the show, there seems to be some internal struggling concerning Kaname and Momomi with the others. Later, after suffering two show-stopping events, all the students involved with the play band together and put on a show the other students will never forget.
17	"Secret"; Transliteration: "Himitsu" (Japanese: 秘密)	July 24, 2006
While all three schools eagerly await the election of a new Etoile couple, Nagisa learns the truth behind this tradition and receives an unexpected invitation from Shizuma in order to find out more information about Shizuma's late partner—the deceased Etoile.
18	"Storm of Love"; Transliteration: "Ai no Arashi" (Japanese: 愛の嵐)	July 31, 2006
During a rainy night in Shizuma's villa, Nagisa finally learns about Kaori Sakuragi, the Etoile that died. However, she also makes a painful discovery of exactly how close the two Etoile were, and how their shared past is still far from being a mere memory.
19	"Refrain"; Transliteration: "Rifurein" (Japanese: リフレイン)	August 7, 2006
Miyuki recounts for Nagisa the events of the past few years concerning Shizuma and the now-deceased Kaori, whom they have both grieved for the past 3 years. As she tells her story, she also touches on the effects Nagisa's coming and passing had on both Shizuma and herself.
20	"Confession"; Transliteration: "Kokuhaku" (Japanese: 告白)	August 14, 2006
In the aftermath of Shizuma avoiding everyone else, a cheerful Nagisa pushes on with her life, but then falls into a state of depression and ponders if coming to Miator was a good idea, which causes Tamao to recount just why Nagisa is so important to her. Meanwhile, Nagisa's first and second year friends, concerned with her mood, decide to band together to cheer her up again. Tamao tells Nagisa of how she was lonely in her dorm room before Nagisa came, Tamao then opens the door and the others come in bringing cookies. The episode ends with Tamao talking to a sleeping Nagisa, and confessing her love to her before kissing her.
21	"Like a Flower"; Transliteration: "Hana no Yōni" (Japanese: 花のように)	August 21, 2006
With the end of Shizuma's tenure as Etoile approaching, she prepares to abdicate her office. A final message from Kaori forces her to reconsider her life's choices, as well as her behaviour towards other people.
22	"Duel"; Transliteration: "Kettō" (Japanese: 決闘)	August 28, 2006
Preparations for the Etoile election are proceeding along and consuming more of everyone's attention. After another physical confrontation with Kaname, Hikari says something to her which motivates Kaname to challenge Amane to a game of tennis. During their match, Yaya and Hikari finally have an important discussion. During the match, Kaname admits that she both hates and loves Amane, because of her inability to ever surpass her at anything. Kaname's lover, Momomi, overhears this and after the match they break up. Amane becomes persuaded to join the Etoile election, with Hikari as her partner. It is also revealed that Tamao and Nagisa had been chosen to represent Miator in the Etoile election.
23	"Maze"; Transliteration: "Meiro" (Japanese: 迷路)	September 4, 2006
To counter Amane's plans of attending the Etoile election, Miyuki makes Tamao and Nagisa an offer not to be refused: enter the game together and repeat Miator's victorious history. Both Nagisa and Shizuma end up in an internal conflict as about how they truly feel, and tragedy strikes when Amane falls off her horse just as she is about to tell Hikari about her feelings.
24	"Wheel of Fate"; Transliteration: "Unmei no Wa" (Japanese: 運命の輪)	September 11, 2006
Amane awakens after her accident, but has suffered partial memory loss—and among the lost memories is her relationship with Hikari, which leaves Hikari heartbroken. In the meantime, Nagisa and Tamao enter training for the Etoile Election and get an unexpected tutor: Shizuma.
25	"Waltz"; Transliteration: "Enbukyoku" (Japanese: 円舞曲)	September 18, 2006
Nagisa and Tamao continue practicing for the dance in preparation of the Etoile Election, but it will take some more of Shizuma's help to improve Nagisa's chances of becoming one of the next Etoiles. Meanwhile, Amane recovers her memories when Hikari sings the song she sang when they first met, and their relationship is consummated.
26	"A Beginning"; Transliteration: "Hajimari" (Japanese: はじまり)	September 25, 2006
The Etoile elections have started. Shizuma makes her final decision about her relationship with Nagisa when she tells Nagisa she loves her in the middle of the ceremony, and the two end up 'eloping' just before the announcement of who won the election. While Amane and Hikari go forward together as the new Etoiles, Shizuma and Nagisa finally consummate their love, but Nagisa has to make up with the heartbroken Tamao.
