= List of Strawberry Panic! short stories =

The first short story from the reader participation project featuring Nagisa and Shizuma as the first couple.

Strawberry Panic! (ストロベリー・パニック!, Sutoroberī Panikku!) is the title of thirty Japanese fictional short stories which focus on a group of teenage girls attending three affiliated all-girl schools. A common theme throughout the stories are the intimate lesbian relationships between the characters. The stories, while written by Sakurako Kimino and illustrated by Chitose Maki, were the product of a reader participation game run by MediaWorks in the bishōjo magazine Dengeki G's Magazine. The game started in the January 2004 issue of the magazine and concluded in the February 2005 issue; this resulted in twenty-five short stories (except for the first) which had been directly influenced by reader participation votes in ten separate rounds of voting. The short stories later spawned many other adaptations in the Strawberry Panic! series, including an anime, manga, and light novel series.

The first three stories appeared in the February 2004 issue of the magazine which was released on December 30, 2003. Three more were published each month up to May 30, 2004, which at the time meant that eighteen stories had been published. This was the completion of the first story arc entitled the Etoile Chapter. The next story arc entitled the Dormitory Panic Chapter comprised seven stories in greater length than the earlier stories. These seven stories were published between June 30 and December 30, 2004, which corresponds to the August 2004 through February 2005 issues of Dengeki G's Magazine. This concluded the reader participation game at twenty-five stories.

After a three-month hiatus, more stories returned in the May 2005 issue of Dengeki G's Magazine on March 30, 2005. This small series of five separate stories was written as a supplementary bibliography of the twelve girls in the story. The series concluded in the September 2005 issue on July 30, 2005. None of the original thirty stories were ever published again in bound volumes.

== Short stories list ==
=== Etoile Chapter ===
#	Coupling	Issue
01	Nagisa/Shizuma	February 2004
02	Kizuna/Remon	February 2004
03	Hikari/Tsubomi	February 2004
04	Nagisa/Tamao	March 2004
05	Hikari/Amane	March 2004
06	Kizuna/Chikaru	March 2004
07	Nagisa/Chiyo	April 2004
08	Hikari/Yaya	April 2004
09	Kizuna/Chikaru	April 2004
10	Nagisa/Tamao	May 2004
11	Nagisa/Amane	May 2004
12	Hikari/Amane	May 2004
13	Nagisa/Tamao	June 2004
14	Hikari/Amane	June 2004
15	Kizuna/Kagome	June 2004
16	Nagisa/Tamao	July 2004
17	Kizuna/Chikaru	July 2004
18	Hikari/Amane	July 2004

=== Dormitory Panic Chapter ===
#	Subject	Issue
01	Nagisa, Shizuma, Chiyo, and Tamao	August 2004
02	Hikari, Amane, Tsubomi, and Yaya	September 2004
03	Kizuna, Chikaru, Kagome, and Remon	October 2004
04	The story revolves around Nagisa	November 2004
05	The story revolves around Hikari	December 2004
06	The story revolves around Kizuna	January 2005
07	Nagisa/Shizuma, Hikari/Amane, and Kizuna/Chikaru	February 2005

=== Supplementary short stories ===
#	Title	Issue
01	"My Oneesama" (わたしのお姉様, Watashi no Oneesama)	May 2005
02	"My Blue Angel" (わたしの蒼い天使, Watashi no Aoi Tenshi)	June 2005
03	"The Prince of the Pure White Star" (真白き星の王子様（前編）, Mashiroki Hoshi no Ōjisama (Zenpen))	July 2005
04	"To Approach the Stormy Dark Clouds" (迫り来る嵐の黒雲, Semari Kitaru Arashi no Kuroun)	August 2005
05	"Like a Golden Rose" (黄金色のばらのように, Koganeiro no Bara Noyōni)	September 2005

== Voting results ==
=== Round 1 (March 2004 issue) ===
Ranking	Coupling	Votes
01	Nagisa/Tamao	481
02	Hikari/Amane	343
03	Kizuna/Chikaru	260
04	Nagisa/Shizuma	246
05	Hikari/Yaya	199
06	Kizuna/Kagome	121
07	Nagisa/Chiyo	120
07	Hikari/Tsubomi	120
09	Kizuna/Remon	89

=== Round 2 (May 2004 issue) ===
Ranking	Coupling	Votes
01	Nagisa/Tamao	150
02	Nagisa/Amane	114
03	Hikari/Amane	102
04	*Tamao/Amane	91
05	Nagisa/Chikaru	90
06	*Tamao/Chikaru	78
07	Nagisa/Hikari	61
08	Amane/Chikaru	58
09	Nagisa/Kizuna	56
10	Hikari/Tamao	54
11	Shizuma/Amane	52
12	Hikari/Chikaru	51
13	Hikari/Shizuma	48
14	Kizuna/Chikaru	46
15	Chiyo/Amane	34
16	Kizuna/Tamao	32
17	Shizuma/Chikaru	30
18	Chiyo/Kagome	29
19	Nagisa/Shizuma	28
19	Hikari/Chiyo	28
21	Hikari/Kizuna	26
22	Kizuna/Chiyo	24
22	Chiyo/Chikaru	24
24	Kizuna/Shizuma	20
24	Hikari/Kagome	20
24	Kizuna/Amane	20
24	Amane/Kagome	20
28	Hikari/Yaya	18
29	Nagisa/Yaya	15
29	Nagisa/Kagome	15
29	Shizuma/Kagome	15
29	Tamao/Tsubomi	15
33	Nagisa/Tsubomi	13
33	Tamao/Kagome	13
33	Kizuna/Yaya	13
36	Shizuma/Tsubomi	11
36	Shizuma/Yaya	11
36	Chiyo/Yaya	11
36	Tsubomi/Chikaru	11
36	Yaya/Chikaru	11
36	Kizuna/Remon	11
42	Shizuma/Tamao	10
42	Kizuna/Kagome	10
44	Tamao/Yaya	9
44	Yaya/Kagome	9
46	Nagisa/Chiyo	8
47	Chiyo/Tamao	6
47	Hikari/Tsubomi	6
47	Tsubomi/Remon	6
50	Nagisa/Remon	5
50	Chiyo/Tsubomi	5
50	Tamao/Remon	5
50	Amane/Tsubomi	5
50	Amane/Remon	5
50	Tsubomi/Kagome	5
56	Shizuma/Chiyo	4
56	Kizuna/Tsubomi	4
56	Chikaru/Remon	4
59	Tsubomi/Yaya	3
59	Yaya/Remon	3
61	Amane/Yaya	2
61	Chikaru/Kagome	2
61	Kagome/Remon	2
64	Shizuma/Remon	1
65	Chiyo/Remon	0
65	Hikari/Remon	0
*The magazine printed both of these as "Tamao/Amane", though one of them should have been "Tamao/Chikaru". It is uncertain which coupling received more votes.

=== Round 3 (July 2004 issue) ===
Ranking	Coupling	Votes
01	Nagisa/Tamao	1215
02	Kizuna/Chikaru	*375
03	Hikari/Amane	*376
04	Nagisa/Amane	281
05	Kizuna/Kagome	221
06	Tamao/Amane	135
07	Nagisa/Hikari	125
08	Nagisa/Chikaru	101
09	Tamao/Chikaru	90
10	Nagisa/Shizuma	74
11	Hikari/Yaya	68
12	Nagisa/Kizuna	65
13	Hikari/Tamao	62
14	Hikari/Chiyo	56
15	Amane/Chikaru	52
16	Tsubomi/Yaya	51
17	Nagisa/Chiyo	49
17	Chiyo/Amane	49
19	Kizuna/Remon	46
20	Kizuna/Amane	45
21	Hikari/Chikaru	44
22	Shizuma/Amane	41
23	Kizuna/Chiyo	39
24	Nagisa/Tsubomi	33
24	Hikari/Tsubomi	33
26	Hikari/Kagome	29
27	Tamao/Remon	28
28	Chiyo/Yaya	26
29	Tamao/Tsubomi	23
30	Yaya/Chikaru	21
31	Shizuma/Tsubomi	19
31	Chiyo/Tsubomi	19
33	Chiyo/Kagome	18
33	Kizuna/Tamao	18
35	Hikari/Shizuma	17
35	Tsubomi/Kagome	17
37	Chiyo/Tamao	15
37	Chiyo/Chikaru	15
37	Tamao/Yaya	15
40	Chiyo/Remon	14
41	Nagisa/Yaya	12
41	Shizuma/Chikaru	12
41	Tamao/Kagome	12
41	Amane/Yaya	12
41	Kizuna/Tsubomi	12
46	Tsubomi/Chikaru	11
47	Amane/Tsubomi	10
47	Chikaru/Kagome	10
49	Kizuna/Shizuma	9
50	Hikari/Kizuna	8
51	Amane/Kagome	7
52	Shizuma/Kagome	6
52	Kizuna/Yaya	6
54	Amane/Remon	5
55	Shizuma/Chiyo	4
55	Yaya/Kagome	4
55	Chikaru/Remon	4
55	Kagome/Remon	4
59	Nagisa/Kagome	3
59	Nagisa/Remon	3
59	Shizuma/Yaya	3
59	Yaya/Remon	3
63	Shizuma/Tamao	0
63	Shizuma/Remon	0
63	Hikari/Remon	0
63	Tsubomi/Remon	0
*This is how the results appeared in the magazine. It is possible that the publishers accidentally switched them.

=== Round 4 (August 2004 issue) ===
Individual results were not given for the character rankings; there were 1034 votes total.

=== Round 5 (September 2004 issue) ===
Ranking	Character	Votes
01	Amane	454
02	Yaya	125
03	Chiyo	84
04	Nagisa	82
05	Shizuma	76
06	Tamao	67
07	Kizuna	63
08	Tsubomi	58
09	Chikaru	50
10	Kagome	29
11	Remon	14
Hikari was exempt; the girl ranked first was coupled with her.

=== Round 6 (October 2004 issue) ===
Ranking	Character	Votes
01	Chikaru	319
02	Amane	103
03	Hikari	81
04	Nagisa	78
05	Kagome	77
06	Remon	75
07	Chiyo	67
08	Tamao	51
09	Yaya	38
10	Tsubomi	36
11	Shizuma	30
Kizuna was exempt; the girl ranked first was coupled with her.

=== Round 7 (November 2004 issue) ===
Ranking	Character	Votes
01	Tamao	217
02	Amane	204
03	Hikari	105
04	Shizuma	99
05	Kizuna	96
06	Chiyo	79
07	Chikaru	68
08	Yaya	42
09	Tsubomi	32
10	Kagome	28
11	Remon	24
Nagisa was exempt; the girl ranked first was coupled with her.

=== Round 8 (December 2004 issue) ===
Ranking	Character	Votes
01	Amane	310
02	Yaya	139
03	Nagisa	105
04	Tamao	93
05	Chikaru	82
06	Kizuna	70
06	Tsubomi	70
08	Shizuma	61
09	Kagome	44
10	Chiyo	43
11	Remon	21
Hikari was exempt; the girl ranked first was coupled with her.

=== Round 9 (January 2005 issue) ===
Ranking	Character	Votes
01	Chikaru	214
02	Amane	163
03	Hikari	121
04	Kagome	110
05	Remon	99
06	Nagisa	77
07	Tamao	67
08	Chiyo	66
09	Yaya	58
10	Shizuma	48
11	Tsubomi	20
Kizuna was exempt; the girl ranked first was coupled with her.

=== Final round (February 2005 issue) ===
Ranking	Coupling	Votes
01	Nagisa/Tamao	1653
02	Hikari/Amane	950
03	Kizuna/Chikaru	728
04	Nagisa/Amane	503
05	Hikari/Yaya	391
06	Kizuna/Kagome	302
07	Nagisa/Shizuma	294
08	Nagisa/Hikari	264
09	Tamao/Amane	259
10	Nagisa/Chikaru	255
11	Tamao/Chikaru	192
12	Nagisa/Kizuna	176
13	Amane/Chikaru	140
14	Hikari/Chikaru	139
15	Hikari/Tamao	137
16	Shizuma/Amane	135
17	Chiyo/Kagome	119
18	Kizuna/Remon	106
19	Tsubomi/Yaya	102
20	Hikari/Chiyo	101
21	Chiyo/Amane	97
22	Nagisa/Chiyo	93
23	Kizuna/Amane	89
24	Kizuna/Chiyo	82
25	Chiyo/Chikaru	74
26	Hikari/Shizuma	69
27	Hikari/Kizuna	57
28	Shizuma/Chikaru	55
28	Kizuna/Tamao	55
30	Shizuma/Yaya	51
30	Hikari/Tsubomi	51
32	Hikari/Kagome	50
33	Amane/Yaya	49
34	Nagisa/Tsubomi	47
35	Nagisa/Yaya	43
35	Yaya/Chikaru	43
37	Tamao/Tsubomi	39
38	Shizuma/Tamao	38
38	Amane/Tsubomi	38
40	Chiyo/Yaya	37
41	Kizuna/Shizuma	36
42	Tamao/Remon	33
43	Chiyo/Tsubomi	32
43	Tamao/Yaya	32
45	Amane/Kagome	28
45	Kizuna/Yaya	28
47	Nagisa/Kagome	27
48	Chiyo/Tamao	26
48	Tamao/Kagome	26
50	Nagisa/Remon	25
51	Tsubomi/Chikaru	22
51	Tsubomi/Kagome	22
51	Chikaru/Kagome	22
54	Shizuma/Kagome	21
54	Kizuna/Tsubomi	21
56	Yaya/Remon	16
57	Chiyo/Remon	14
58	Shizuma/Chiyo	13
60	Amane/Remon	11
60	Chikaru/Remon	11
62	Shizuma/Tamao	10
63	Tsubomi/Remon	6
63	Kagome/Remon	6
65	Shizuma/Remon	1
66	Hikari/Remon	0
