= Eleven New Bagatelles, Op. 119 =

Piano works by Ludwig van Beethoven

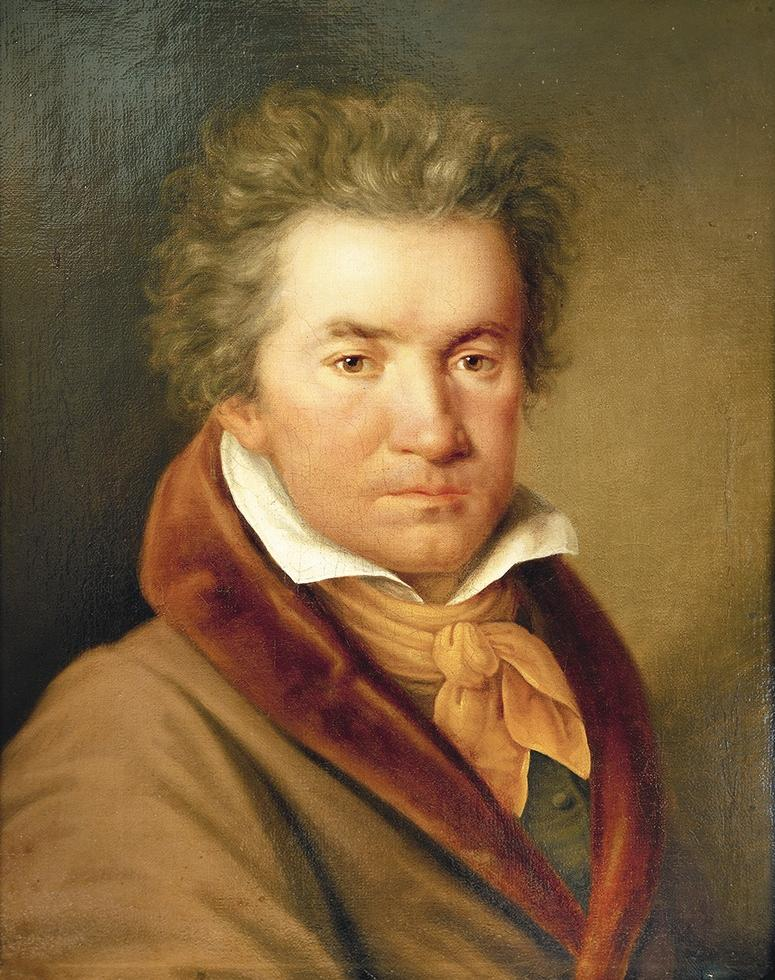
Beethoven depicted in an 1815 portrait by Joseph Willibrord Mähler

The Eleven New Bagatelles, Op. 119 were written by Ludwig van Beethoven between the 1790s and the early 1820s. A typical performance of the complete set lasts around 14 minutes.

== History ==
By the end of 1803, Beethoven had already sketched bagatelles Nos. 1 to 5 (along with several other short works for piano that he never published). In 1820, he first finished the last five bagatelles of Op. 119, and published them as a set of five in June 1821 for Wiener Pianoforteschule Schule by Friedrich Stark.

The following year, he revised his old bagatelle sketches to construct a new collection for publication, adding a final bagatelle, No. 6, composed in late 1822. Initially, Beethoven struggled to get a deal to publish any of the bagatelles. Beethoven met with many people such as Peters of Leipzig and Pacini in Paris for publishing, who declined his request.

Eventually, Beethoven managed to have the entire set published: first by Clementi in London in 1823, Maurice Schlesinger in Paris some time around the end of 1823, and Sauer & Leidesdorf in Vienna in April 1824. It is unclear to what degree this represents the composer's intentions.

Some scholars have argued that the two halves of Op. 119 — Nos. 1 to 6, and Nos. 7 to 11 — are best thought of as separate collections. However, it is also possible that when Beethoven composed No. 6 in late 1822, he had already planned to send all eleven pieces to England. In that case, No. 6 would not be meant as a conclusion to the first five, but as a way to connect them with the latter five.

The key relationship and thematic similarities between No. 6 and No. 7 support this hypothesis, as does the fact that in subsequent correspondence, Beethoven expressed only satisfaction with how the bagatelles were published in England after his ex-pupil Ferdinand Ries helped get the collection published.

== Form ==
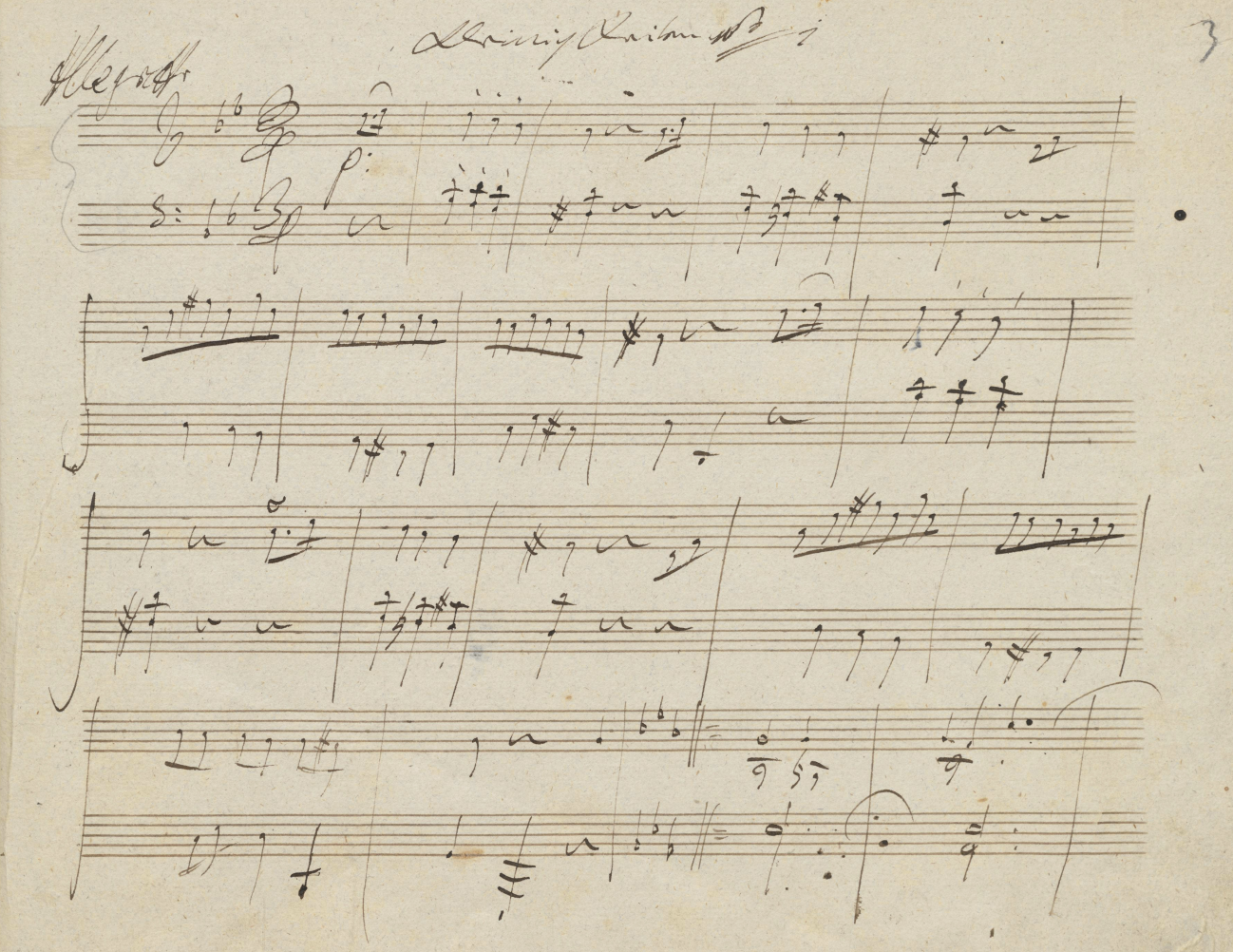
Page one of the manuscript from Beethoven's Bagatelle in G minor, Op. 119 (c. 1822)

There are 11 pieces in the set:

1. G minor. Allegretto: The opening piece is in ternary form with a coda. The A section in G minor uses two-note phrases.
2. C major. Andante con moto: This bagatelle uses a simple two-part structure ending with a short coda. There are two rhythmic ideas in this work: eighth notes and triplets as the melody.
3. D major. A l'Allemande: The form is ABA with an animated coda.
4. A major. Andante cantabile: This piece uses a brief ternary form with repeats at measures 8 and 16.
5. C minor. Risoluto: The structure is ABC, with A and B having 1 repeat.
6. G major. Andante — Allegretto: The piece opens with the Andante, which includes a cadenza styled passage after the fermata. The Allegretto section uses a general rhyme of two sixteenth notes and one eighth note. This section climaxes at a sudden change in the meter with rhythmic diminution, which leads into the 6/8 section. The 6/8 section uses a new rhythm of six 16th notes ending on an 8th note, before returning to a 2/4 time signature and ending the piece with the theme from the Allegretto.
7. C major. Allegro, ma non troppo: The structure is ABA. Beethoven uses less conventional musical ideas that also appear in his late piano sonatas, such as progressive rhythmic diminution with sustained trills.
8. C major. Moderato cantabile: The eighth bagatelle's structure is AB, with each part having one repeat.
9. A minor. Vivace moderato: This bagatelle is a waltz, and uses ternary form without a coda. The piece is uses the following harmonic progression of I – ♭II6- V7 – I.
10. A major. Allegramente: The shortest piece Beethoven published at just 13 measures long. The piece uses two four-bar phrases and ends with a four-bar coda.
11. B♭ major. Andante, ma non troppo: The final piece in the set is in binary form with a codetta. The first four bars repeat once. This bagatelle highlighted Beethoven’s late compositional style.

== See also ==
- Bagatelles, Op. 33
- Bagatelles, Op. 126
