= Elisabeth Röckel =

German opera singer (1793–1883)

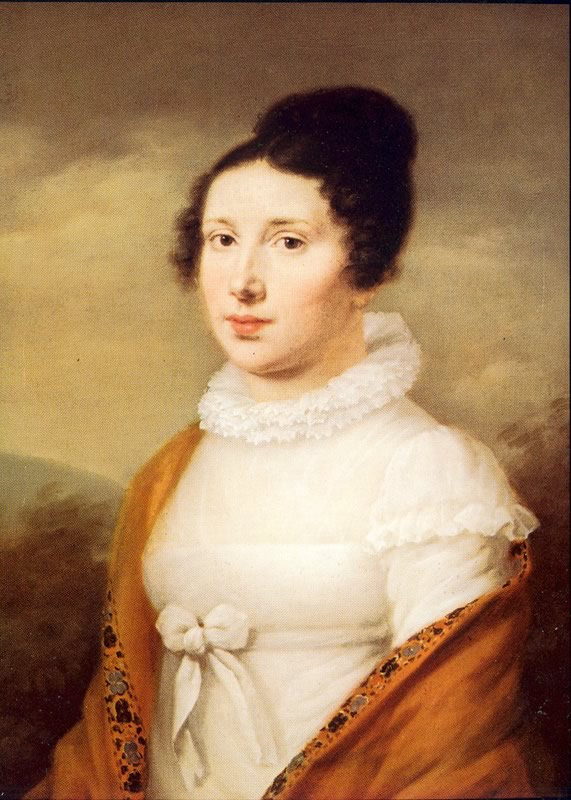
- Born: 15 March 1793; Neunburg vorm Wald, Electorate of Bavaria, Holy Roman Empire
- Died: 3 March 1883 (aged 89); Weimar, Saxe-Weimar-Eisenach, German Empire
- Occupation: Opera singer
- Known for: Potential dedicatee of "Für Elise"
- Spouse: Johann Nepomuk Hummel (m. 1813; died 1837)
- Relatives: Joseph August Röckel (brother)

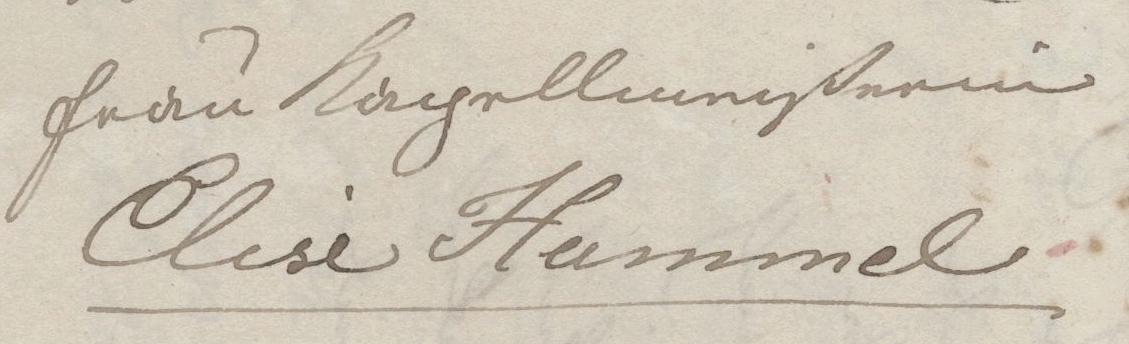
Letter from Anna Milder-Hauptmann to "Elise Hummel", 1830 (fragment), Düsseldorf, Goethe-Museum

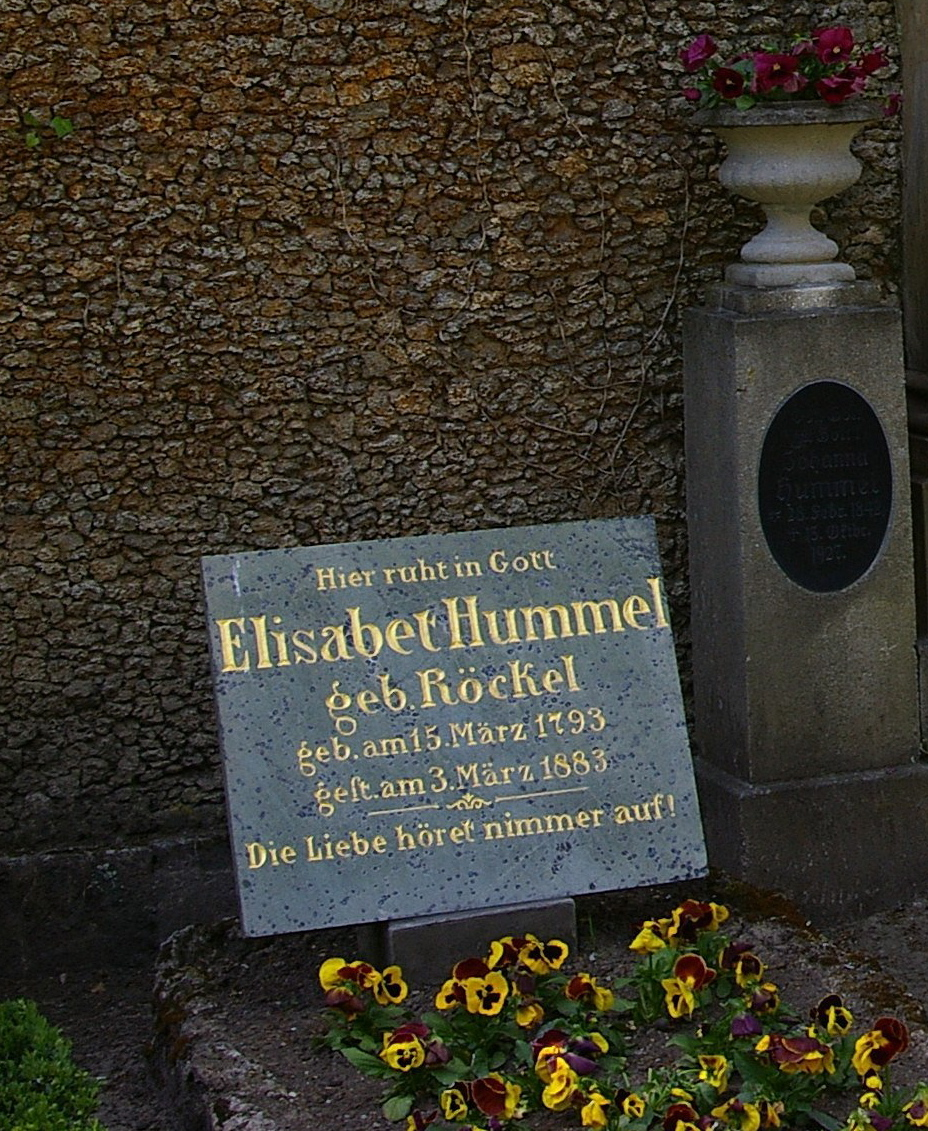
The grave of Elisabeth Hummel nee Röckel at Weimar's Historical Cemetery

Elisabeth Röckel (15 March 1793 – 3 March 1883) was a German soprano opera singer and the wife of the composer Johann Nepomuk Hummel.

== Life ==
Röckel was born in Neunburg vorm Wald, Bavaria, and was baptised Maria Eva. She was a sister of the opera singer Joseph August Röckel (1783–1870) who played Florestan in the second version of Beethoven’s opera Fidelio, which premiered in the Theater an der Wien in 1806. In 1806 she came to Vienna, where she lived in a flat in the theater, together with her brother.

In a register of the residents of the theater she is named "Elis [!] Rökel". According to this register in another flat of the theater lived the famous singer Anna Milder-Hauptmann with her family, who played the title role of Fidelio. She became a close friend of Elisabeth. Many sources show that Elisabeth often met with Beethoven, who fell in love with her and wished to marry her.

In April 1810, Elisabeth Röckel was engaged at the theater in Bamberg where she made her stage debut as Donna Anna in Mozart's Don Giovanni, and became a friend of the writer E. T. A. Hoffmann.

The German musicologist Klaus Martin Kopitz has suggested that Beethoven wrote his famous Bagatelle No. 25 for piano, commonly known as "Für Elise", in the days of Elisabeth Röckel's departure from Vienna. It had the inscription "Für Elise am 27 April zur Erinnerung von L. v. Bthvn" [For Elise on 27 April (1810) as memento by L. v. Bthvn]. Anna Milder-Hauptmann named her "Elise" in a letter to her.

During the days before Beethoven's death, she and her husband Hummel visited Beethoven several times, and cut and saved a lock of his hair. In 1934, this was discovered in Florence by Wilhelm Hummel, a descendant of Johann Nepomuk Hummel. The lock of hair is now held at the Ira F Brilliant Center for Beethoven Studies, in the Dr. Martin Luther King Jr. Library on the campus of San Jose State University.

Röckel lived in Weimar from 1819, until her death at age 89, in 1883.
