= Seven Bagatelles, Op. 33 =

Set of piano pieces by Ludwig van Beethoven

The Bagatelles, Op. 33, for solo piano were composed by Ludwig van Beethoven in 1801–1802 and published in 1803 through the Viennese publisher Bureau des arts et d'industrie. The seven bagatelles are quite typical of Beethoven's early style, retaining many compositional features of the early Classical period.

Bagatelle No. 1

Bagatelle No. 4
Digital piano MIDI captures

Most of the individual pieces are considered easy to play for new students.

1. The first bagatelle, which is in the key of E♭ major, is perhaps the most well-known of the set. It is in ABA form. The A section starts with the right hand playing a soothing melody and the left hand accompanying it with broken chords. The B section, which starts with the key of E♭ minor, plays a simple melody, then modulates to the original key with the B♭ major scale and then the E♭ major scale, then back to the A section.
2. The second bagatelle, in C major, is the perhaps the second-hardest of the set. It contains third scales, arpeggios, and a continuous left hand scale.
3. The third bagatelle, in F major, starts off with the right hand playing the introduction and the left hand playing arpeggios.
4. The fourth bagatelle is a gentle andante in A major. The middle section is in the key of A minor.
5. The fifth bagatelle, which perhaps is the hardest of the set, is in the key of C major. It starts off with arpeggios, a little similar to Chopin's Étude Op. 10, No. 1. After the introduction, the right hand and the left hand play the melody with their 4th and 5th fingers. After the C minor section, it goes back to the main theme.
6. The sixth bagatelle, is in the key of D major.
7. The seventh and final bagatelle, is in the key of A♭ major. It starts off with the left hand playing staccatos and the right hand playing the melody.

== See also ==
- Bagatelles, Op. 119
- Bagatelles, Op. 126
