= Bagatelles, Op. 126 (Beethoven) =

1824 piano compositions by Ludwig van Beethoven

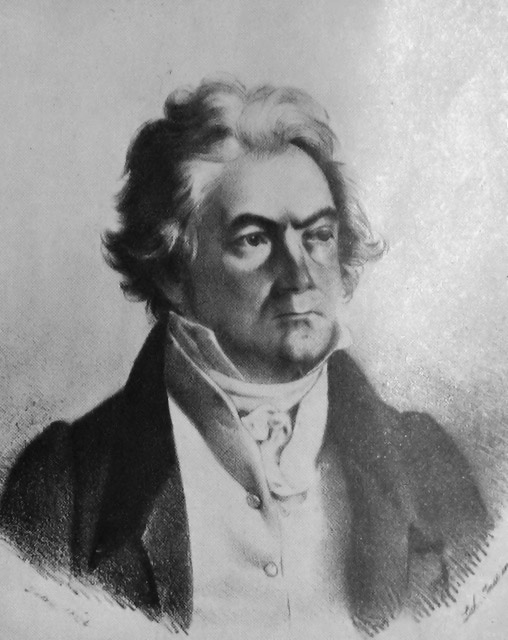
Ludwig van Beethoven (1824) by Johann Stephan Decker

The Six Bagatelles, Op. 126 are six pieces for solo piano composed by Ludwig van Beethoven. They were composed in 1824 and published the next year. Beethoven dedicated them to his brother Nikolaus Johann van Beethoven (1776–1848), and wrote to his publisher, Schott Music, that these bagatelles "are probably the best I've written".

== Form ==
Bagatelles, Op. 126
MIDI capture from piano performance

This set comprises six short works. The odd-numbered pieces are slower, the even-numbered pieces are faster. A performance of the collection takes approximately 18 to 19 minutes.

1. Andante con moto, Cantabile e compiacevole, G major, 3/4

2. Allegro, G minor, 2/4

3. Andante, Cantabile e grazioso, E♭ major, 3/8

4. Presto, B minor, (cut time)

5. Quasi allegretto, G major, 6/8

6. Presto, E♭ major,, then Andante amabile e con moto, 3/8

== Analysis ==
In prefatory remarks to his edition of the works, Otto von Irmer notes that Beethoven intended the six bagatelles be played, in order, as a single work, at least insofar as this can be inferred from a marginal annotation Beethoven made in the manuscript: Ciclus von Kleinigkeiten (cycle of little pieces). Lewis Lockwood suggests another reason to regard the work as a unity rather than a collection: starting with the second bagatelle, the keys of the pieces fall in a regular succession of descending major thirds, a pattern Lockwood also notices in Beethoven's Eroica Symphony and String Quartet No. 12.

Maurice J. E. Brown, writing in the Grove Dictionary, says of the Bagatelles that they "are thoroughly typical of their composer and show affinities with the greater instrumental works written at the same time." Some possible such affinities are as follows: No. 1 shares the terse, elliptical expression of the first movement of the Piano Sonata, Op. 101; No. 3 shares the style of elaborate, high-register elaboration of a slow melody in triple time, seen in the slow movement of the Hammerklavier Sonata; and the final Bagatelle opens with a chaotic passage reminiscent of the opening of the finale of the Ninth Symphony.

== See also ==
- Bagatelles, Op. 33
- Bagatelles, Op. 119
