= Alexandre Colin =

Alexandre Colin may refer to:

- Alexander Colyn, Flemish sculptor
- Alexandre-Marie Colin, French painter and engraver
