= Georg Lemberger =

German painter and woodcut artist

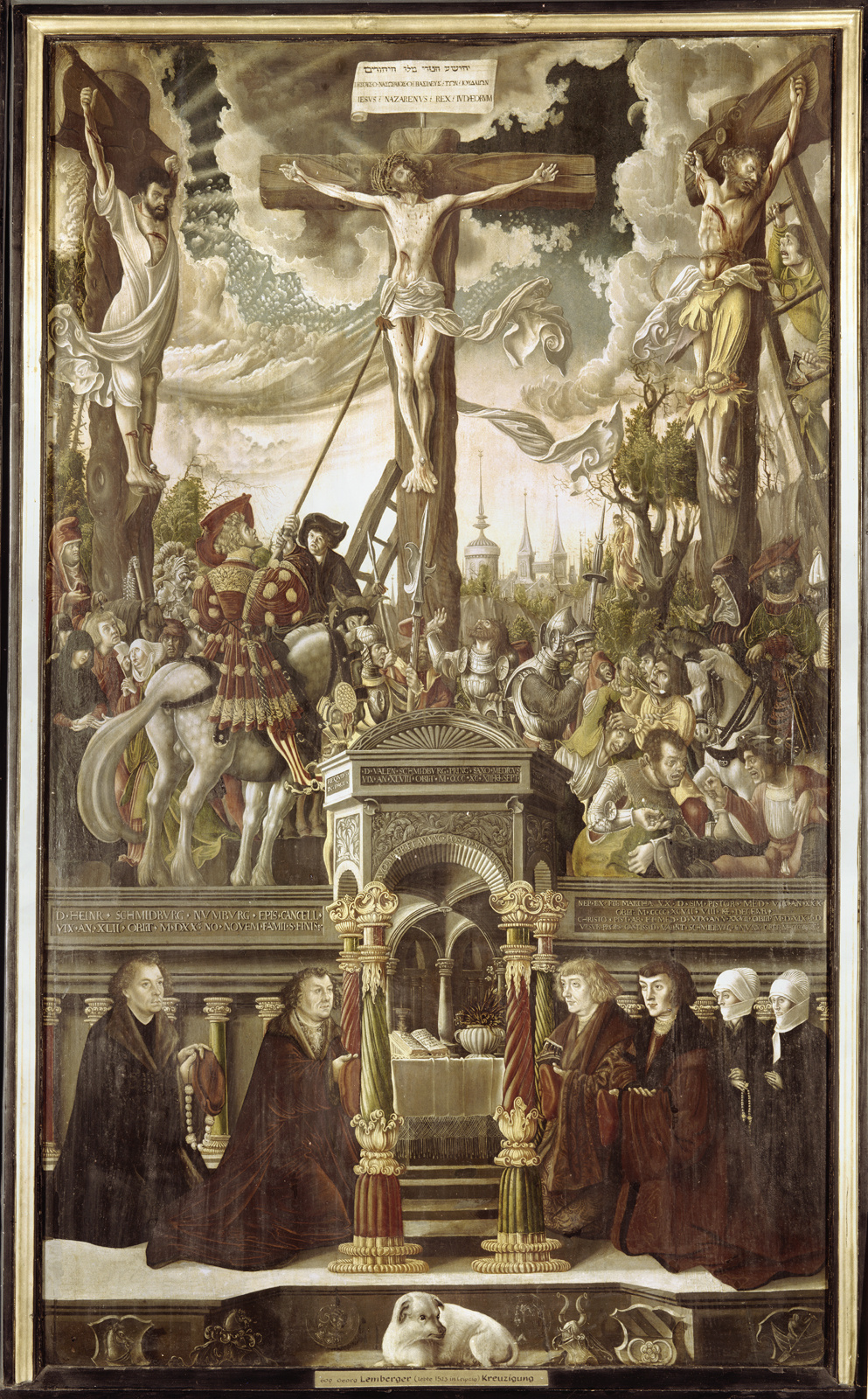
Epitaph for Valentin Schmidburg (1522)

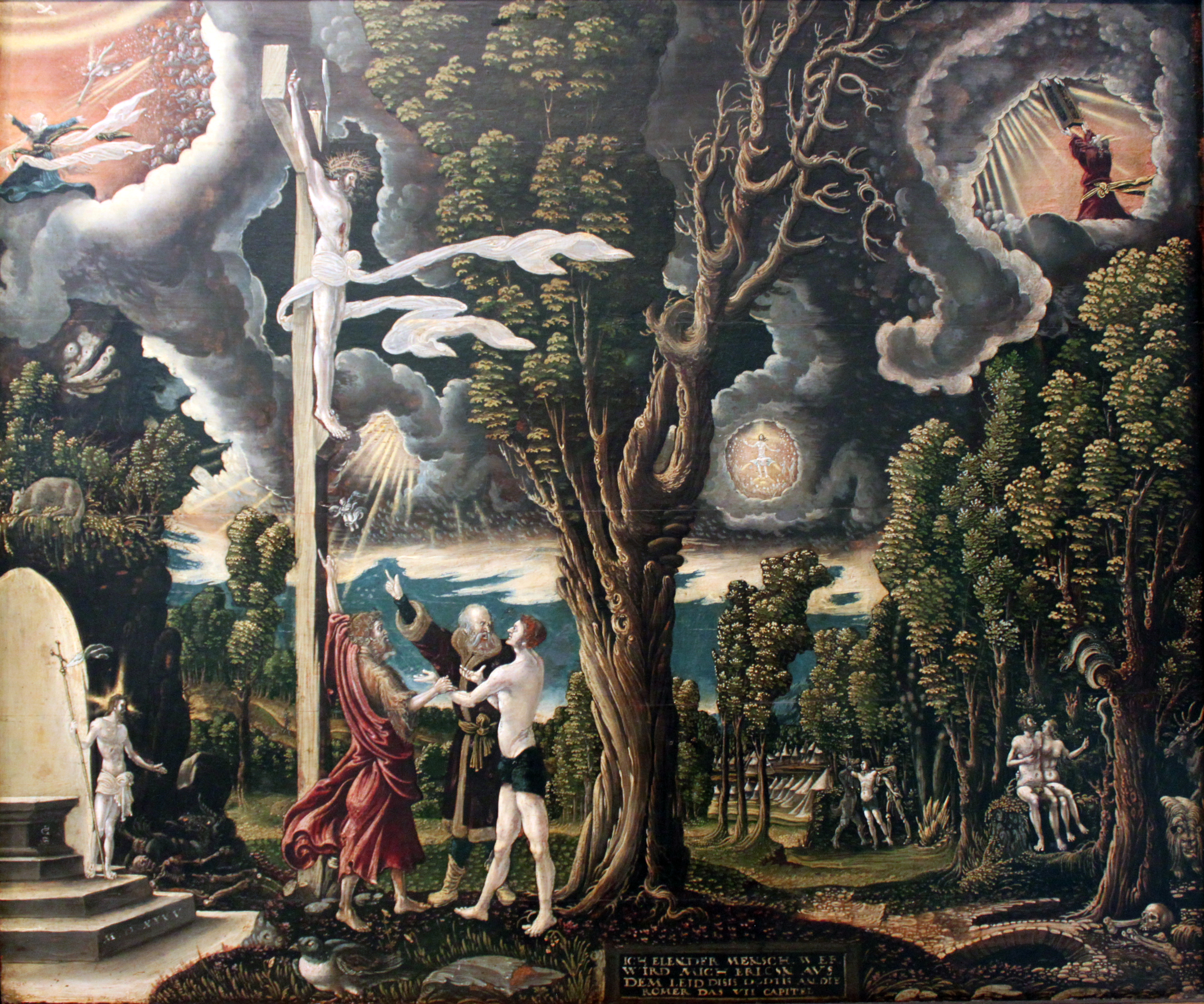
Fall and Redemption (1535)

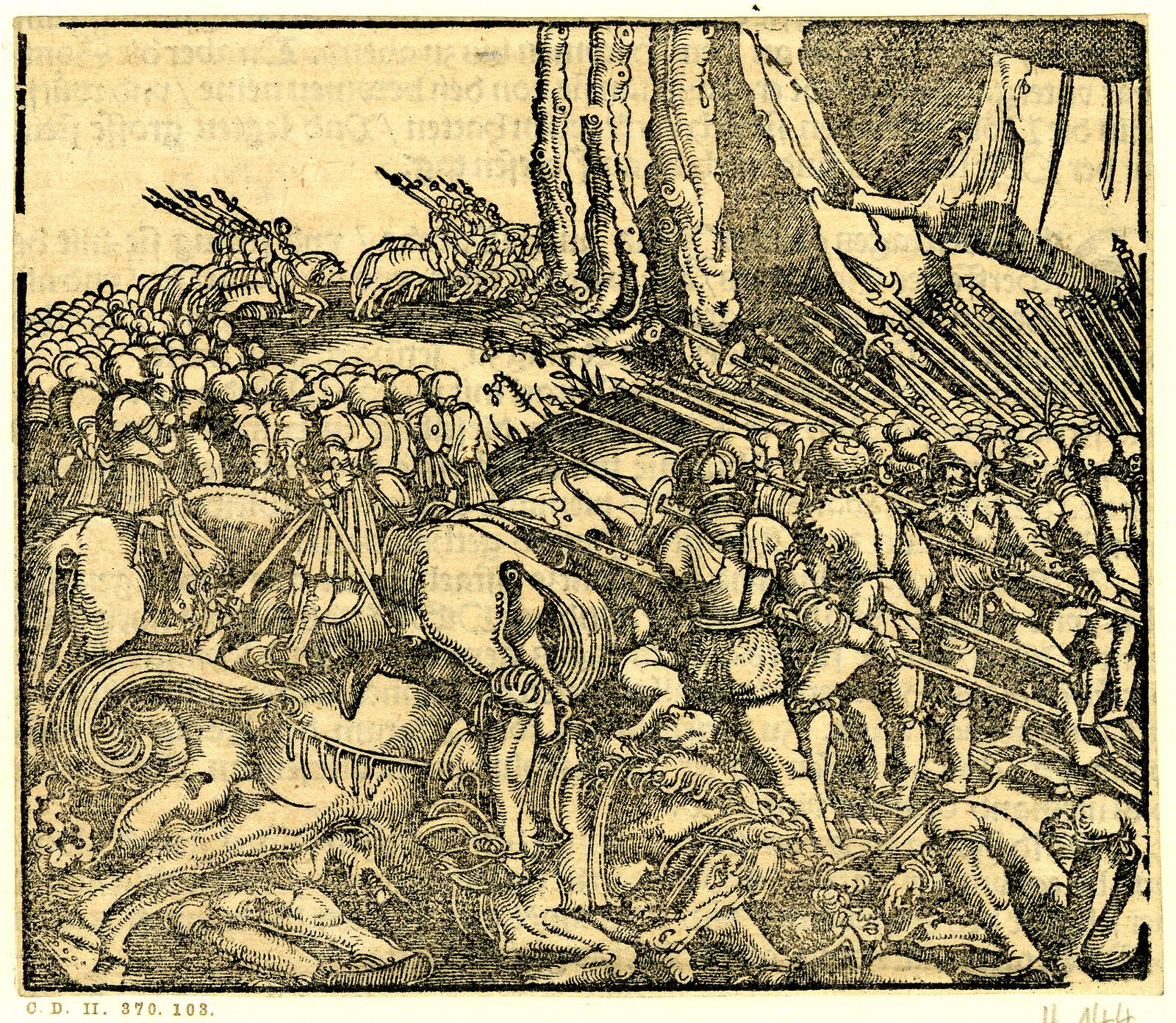
The battle between Asa and Baasha, illustration from Hans Lufft's High German Bible, Wittenberg, 1550.

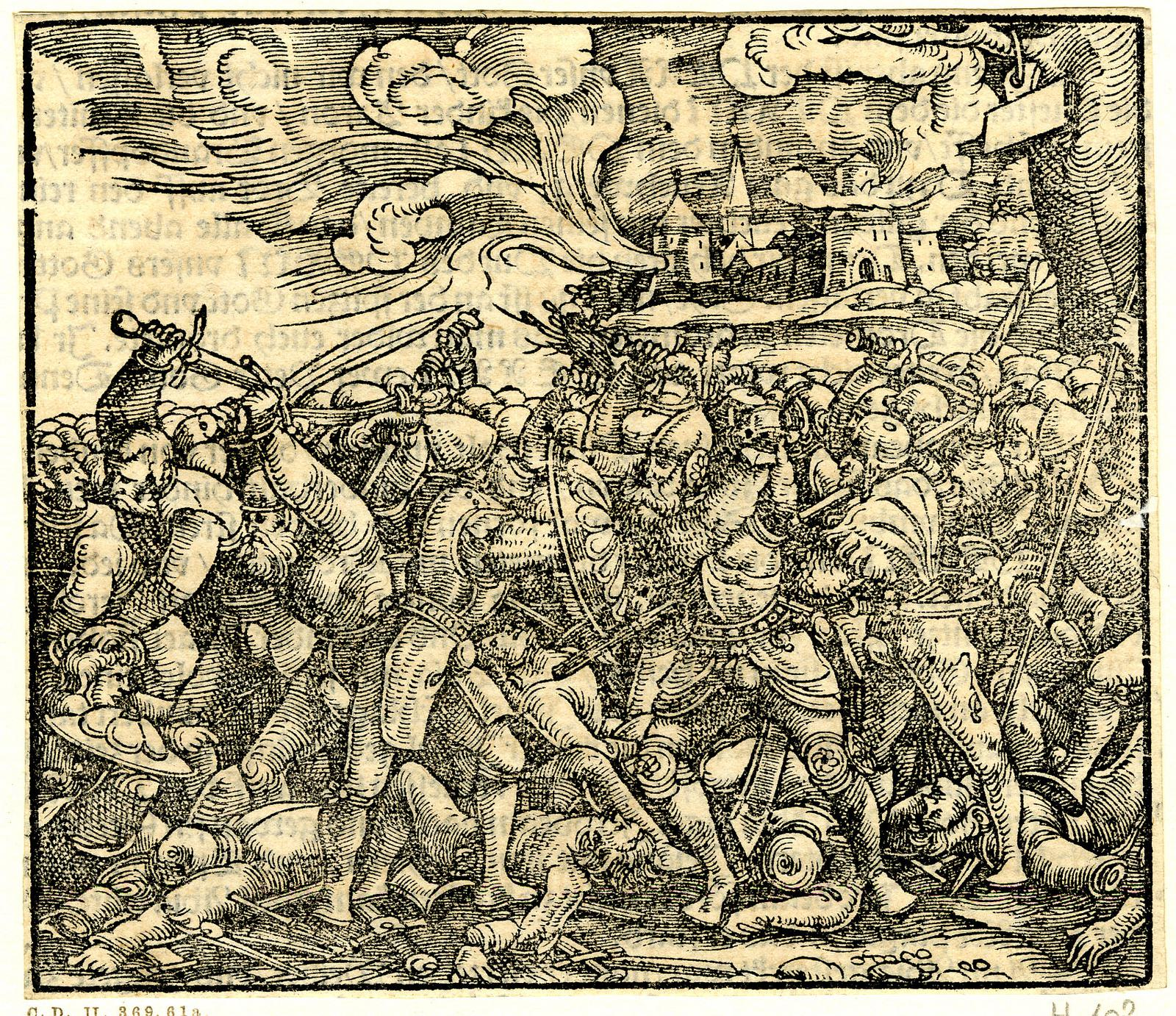
Asa defeating the army of Zerah the Cushite, illustration from Hans Lufft's High German Bible, Wittenberg, 1550.

Georg Lemberger (c.1490–1500, in Landshut – c.1540–1545) was a German painter and woodcut artist.

== Life and work ==
He was probably related to the sculptor Hans Leinberger, who also lived in Landshut, but the relationship is unclear. It appears certain that he took his first lessons from Leinberger, however, then was apprenticed to Hans Wertinger, the court painter for Duke Louis X. After that, he travelled to Regensburg, where he studied with Albrecht Altdorfer and had a hand in creating the paintings for the "Triumphal Procession" of Emperor Maximilian I. Around 1520, his style is noticeable in a panel painting, "The Conversion of Saint Paul", in the Bishopric of Naumburg-Zeitz. In 1522, he appears in Leipzig, where he created the "Epitaph for Valentin Schmidburg" (a medical doctor who had also served as a city counselor and syndic), which is now in the Museum der bildenden Künste. A year later, he was made a citizen of Leipzig.

The next record of him is in 1530, when he was served legal process on charges of abusing his wife. Two years later, he was banished by George, Duke of Saxony for being a Lutheran. He then went to Magdeburg, where he created 125 woodcuts for the "Low German Bible" of Johannes Bugenhagen; printed by Melchior Lotter. The last confirmed record of him comes from 1537, when he was a registered participant at the Easter Vigil in Leipzig. It is assumed that he died no later than 1545, in either Leipzig or Magdeburg.

He also created woodcuts for the first part of the Luther Bible (1523), the title page and some illustrations for the so-called "Emser Testament" (1527) and the title and two folios for the Gustav Vasa Bible (1541). His few surviving artworks include a depiction of the Turkish Siege of Vienna in Merseburg Cathedral (1529) and "Fall and Redemption" (1535), now in the Germanisches Nationalmuseum of Nuremberg. A "Crucifixion" at the Church of Lössen in Schkopau was lost in 1975, during the Communist regime.
