= Hans Wertinger =

German painter

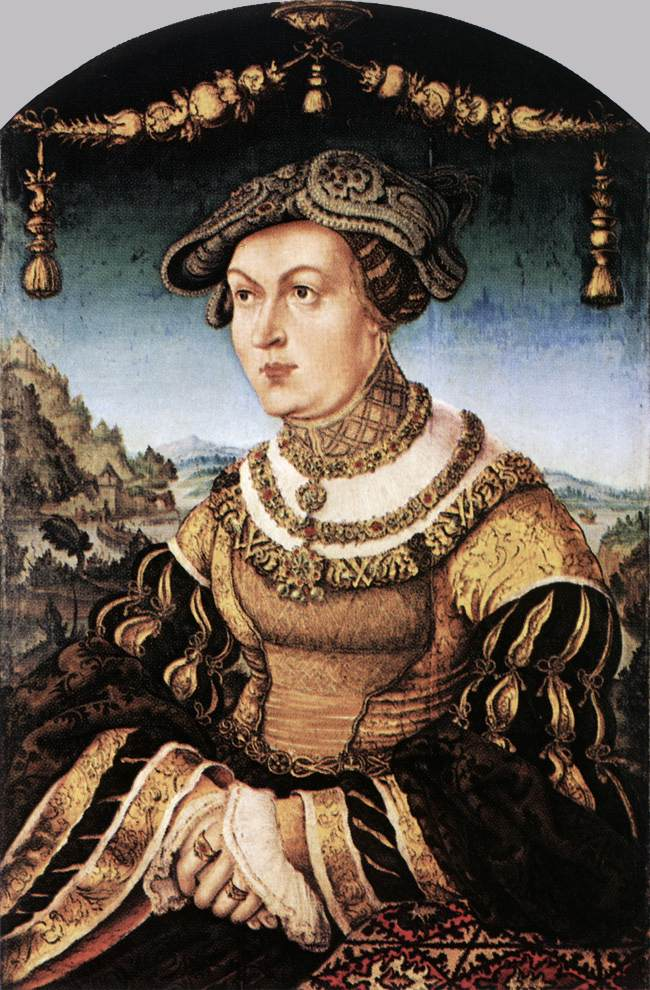
Princess Maria Jacobäa

Hans Wertinger (c. 1465 – 1533), was a German painter.

== Biography ==
He was born in Landshut and worked in Munich. He is known for portraits which he finished with decorative hanging garlands at the top. He died in Landshut.

== Works ==
- King Alexander and his physician Philip, National Gallery in Prague

== Literature ==
- Jaroslav Pešina, German Painting of the 15th and 16th Centuries, Artia Praha 1962
- 2 artworks by or after Hans Wertinger at the Art UK site
- Hans Wertinger on Artnet
