= Bernhard, Arnold, and Florian Abel =

The brothers Bernhard Abel and Arnold Abel were sculptors and Florian Abel a painter in the middle of the 16th century.

In 1561, Bernhard and Arnold worked for the Imperial Court in Vienna. On 28 April, they signed a contract on the completion of the unfinished tomb of Emperor Maximilian I in the court chapel of Innsbruck.

Florian, residing in Prague, provided the sketches for the reliefs. Bernhard travelled to Salzburg to purchase marble, Arnold to Italy with the same purpose and to study the old masters. In December, the two sculptors reunited in Innsbruck, but did not further their work, even though they were provided with all that was necessary from the government and had received the drafts from Florian.

In 1562, they had only accomplished "the fourth part of a history". Due to their excessive lifestyles, they fell critically ill. They were provided with helpers, sent by sculptor Marx Müller from Antwerp: Franz Willems, Hans Ernhofer and Michael von der Vecken. Bernhard died at the end of December 1563 or beginning of January 1564. Arnold followed in February.

Their work was finished by Alexander Collin, a sculptor from Mechelen in the province of Antwerp. According to his report, the two brothers had only begun with three of the reliefs, but finished none. Collin continued to work after the sketches from Florian Abel.

== Sources ==
- Lambiek Comiclopedia biography.
- Allgemeine Deutsche Biographie - online version at Wikisource
