= Alexander Colyn =

Flemish sculptor

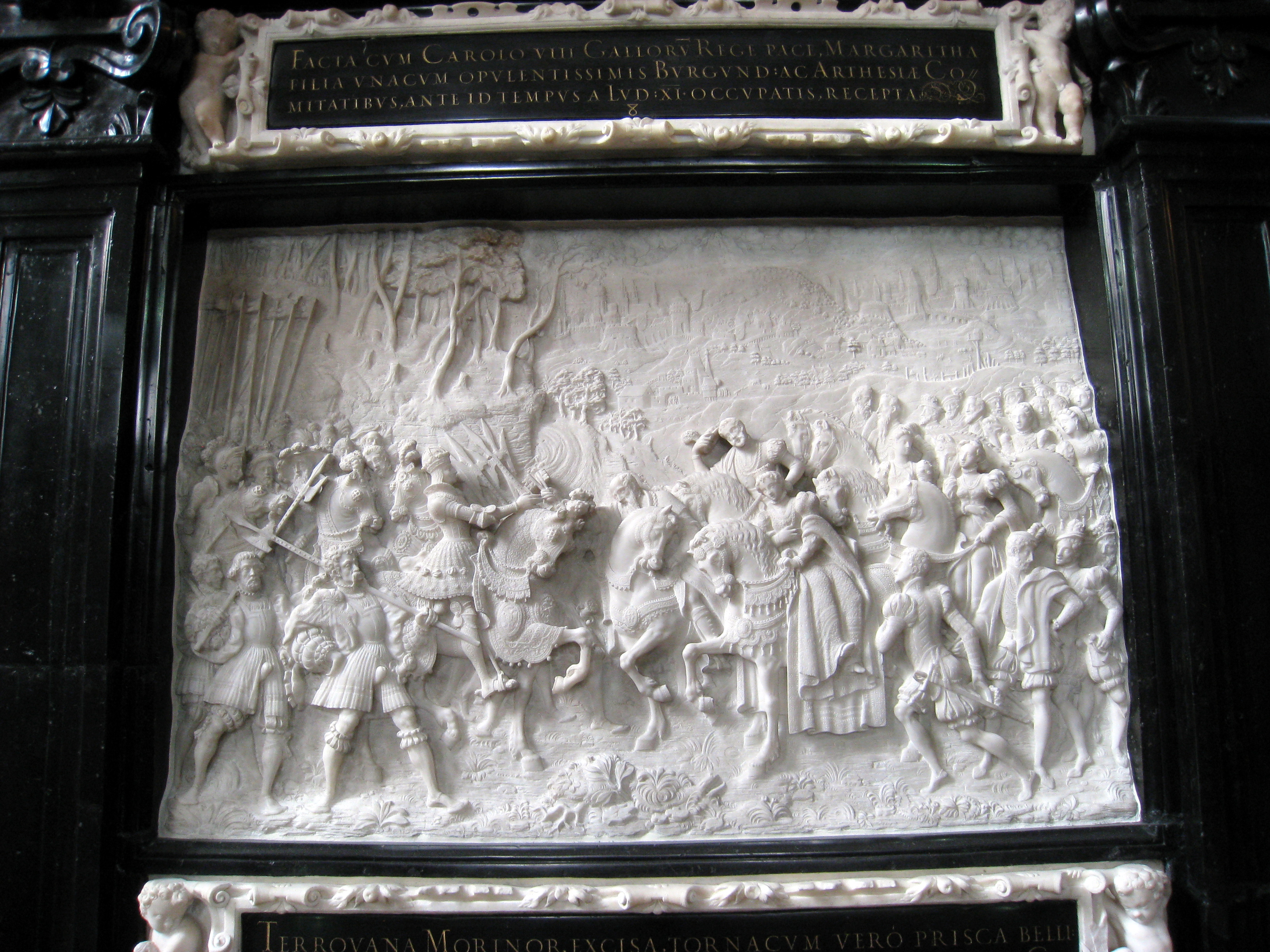
Alexander Colyn, cenotaph of Maximilian I, marble relief based on wood carvings by Albrecht Durer

Alexander Colyn (also spelt Colin or Colins; 1527 or 1529 – 17 August 1612) was a Flemish sculptor.

== Biography ==
Colyn was born in Mechelen, Habsburg Netherlands. In 1563 he went, at the invitation of the emperor Ferdinand I, to Innsbruck, to work on the magnificent monument which was being erected to Maximilian I in the nave of the Franciscan church. Of the twenty-four marble altirilievi (high reliefs), representing the emperors principal acts and victories, which adorn the sides of this tomb, twenty were executed by Colyn, apparently in three years. The work displays a remarkable combination of liveliness and spirit with extreme care and finish, its delicacy rivaling that of a fine cameo. Bertel Thorvaldsen is said to have pronounced it the finest work of its kind. Colyn, who was sculptor in ordinary both to the emperor and to his son, the archduke Ferdinand of Tirol, did a great deal of work for his patrons at Innsbruck and in its neighborhood; particular mention may be made of the sepulchers of the archduke and his first wife, Philippine Welser, both in the same church as the Maximilian monument, and of Bishop Jean Nas. His wife Maria de Vleeschouwer's tomb is by his hand and dated 1594. His own tomb in the cemetery at Innsbruck bears a fine bas-relief executed by one of his sons.

In Innsbruck, between 1566 and 1590, he also made the so-called Royal Mausoleum for St. Vitus Cathedral at Prague Castle. It is a marble tomb, where are depicted and buried members of the Habsburg monarchy: emperor Ferdinand I with his wife Anna of Bohemia and Hungary and their son emperor Maximilian II.

He is credited with bringing the artistic style of European courts to Germany, where from 1558 to 1559 he managed the sculpting of the Ottheinrichsbau (German, Ottheinrich palace or simply building) in Heidelberg, Baden-Württemberg. He contributed to the tombs of Ferdinand II, which he designed, and of Maximilian I, where he sculpted a number of marble reliefs.

== Students ==
Colleagues and students in his workshop in Innsbruck were his son Andreas Colyn, also known as Andreas de Clievere, Hans Conrad, Dominik Farent, and Franz Perwon.

== Works ==
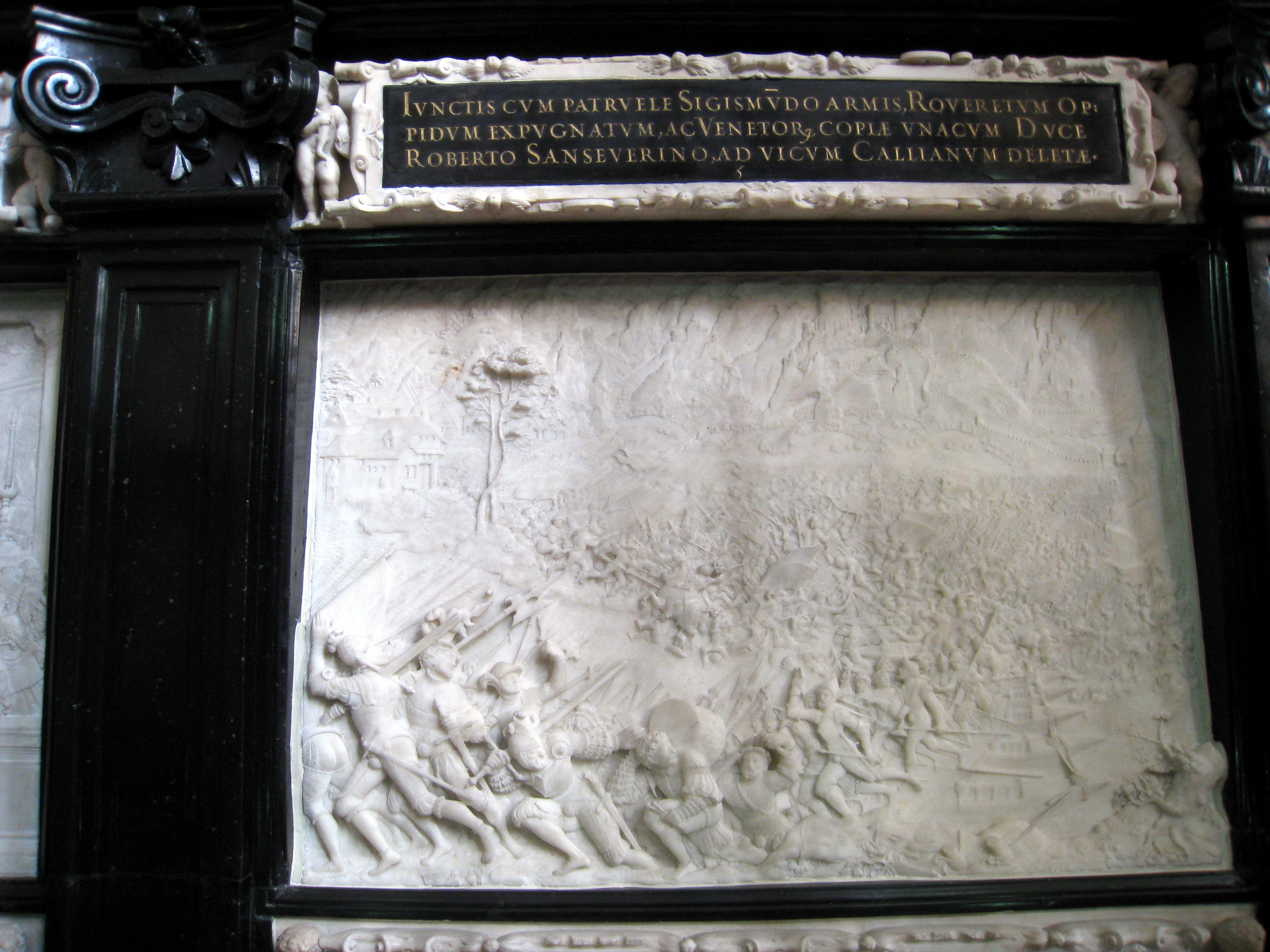
Alexander Colyn, cenotaph of Maximilian I, marble relief based on wood carvings by Albrecht Dürer

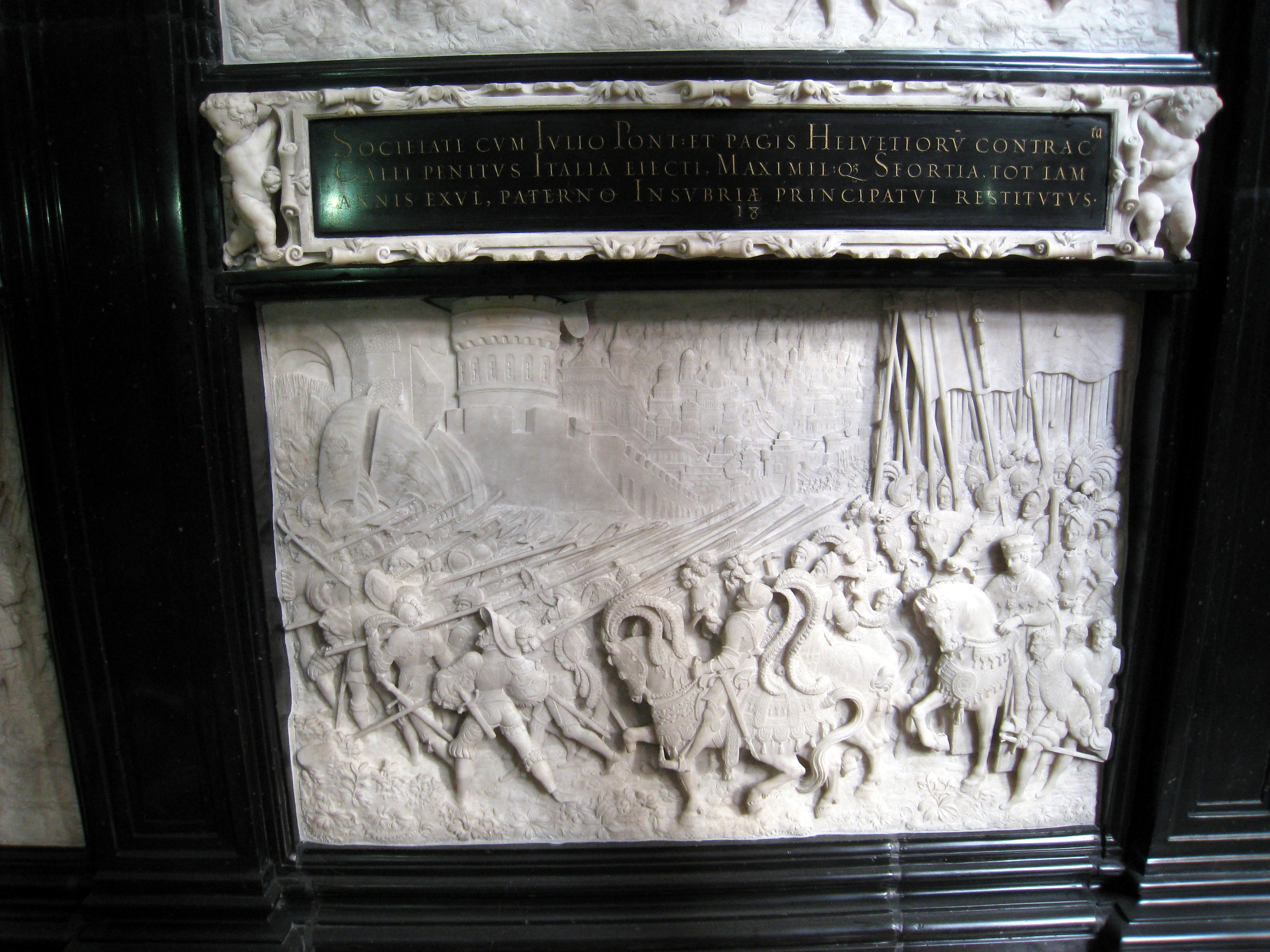
Alexander Colyn, cenotaph of Maximilian I, marble relief based on wood carvings by Albrecht Dürer

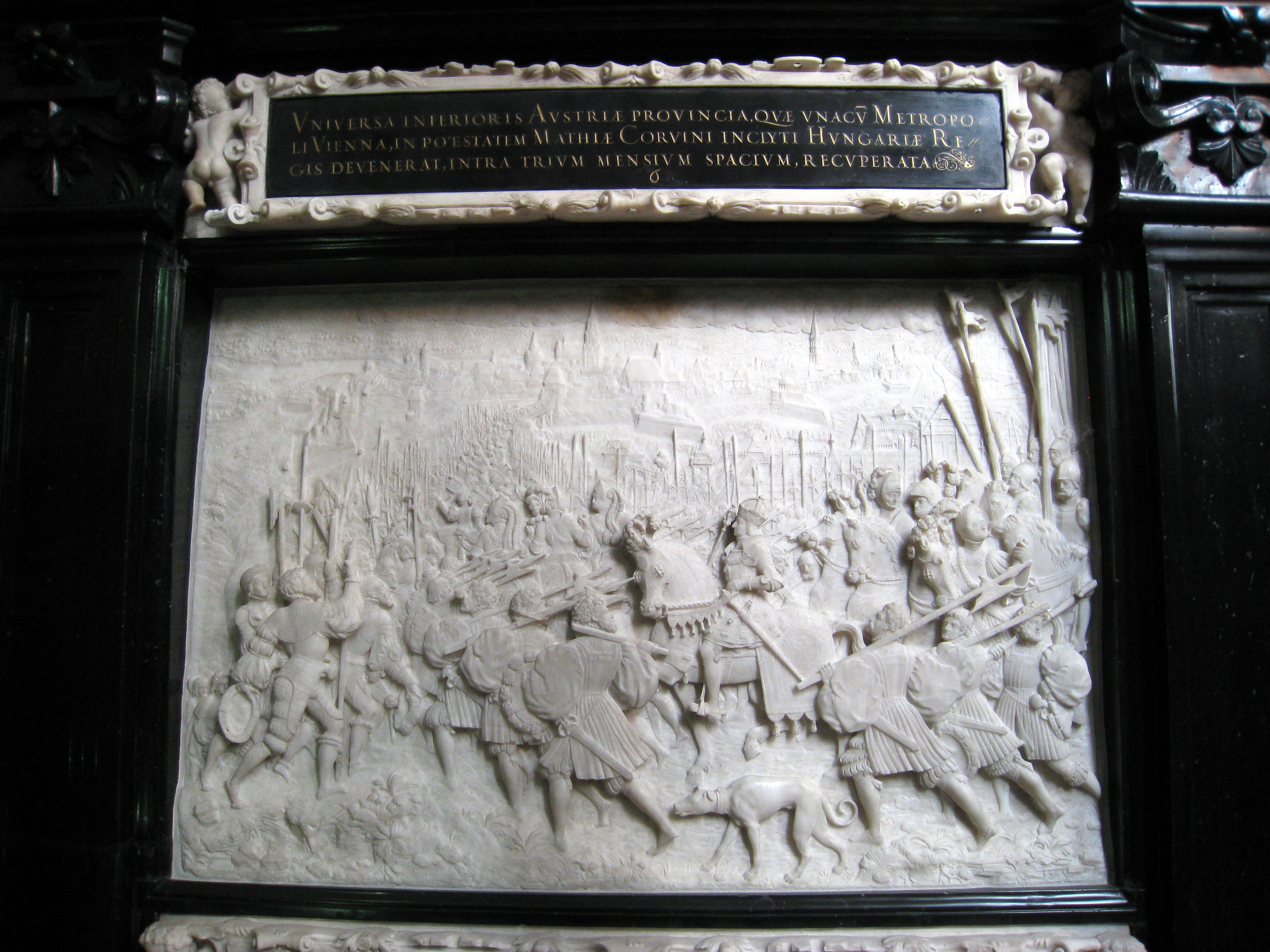
Alexander Colyn, cenotaph of Maximilian I, marble relief based on wood carvings by Albrecht Dürer

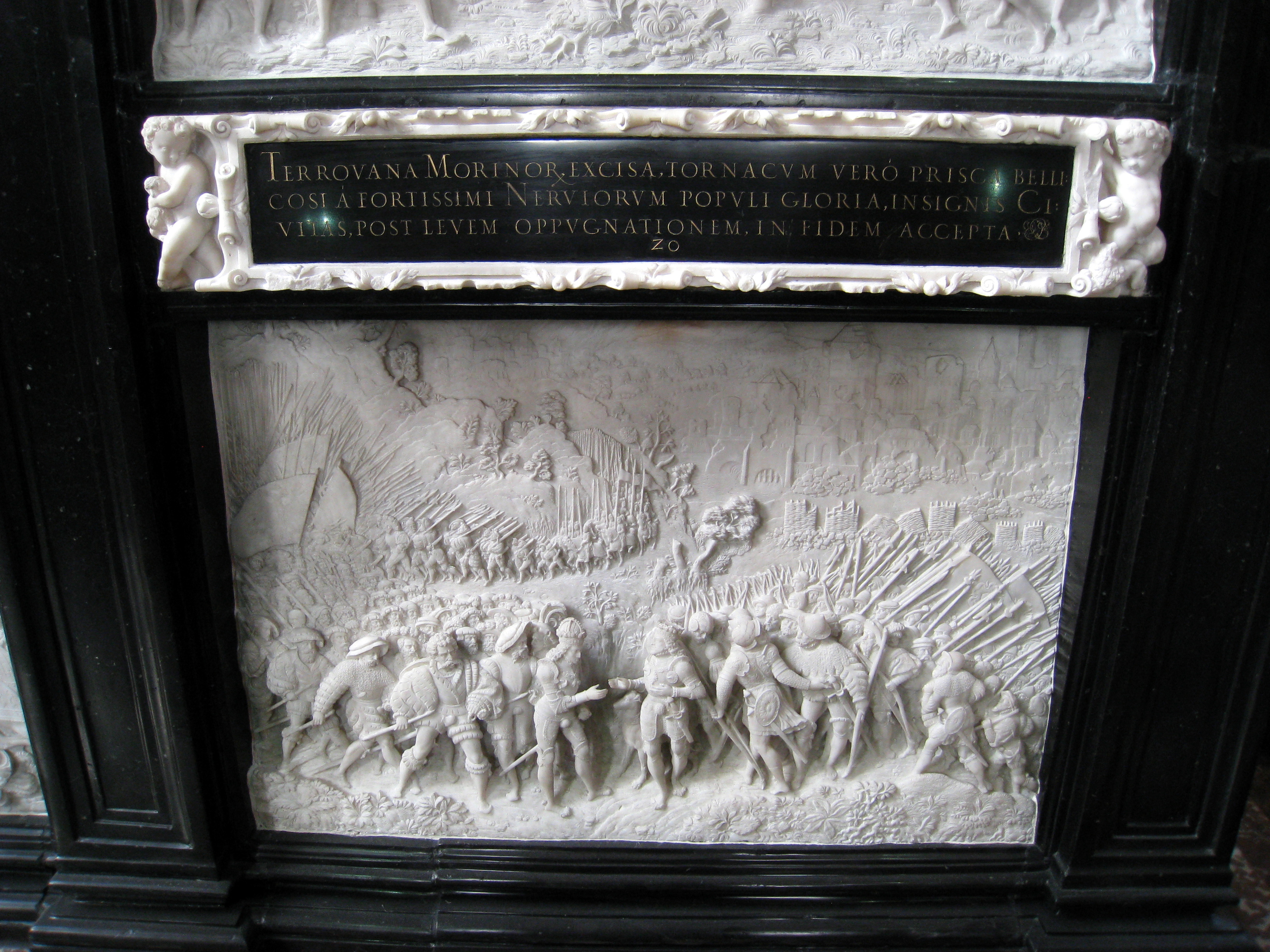
Alexander Colyn, cenotaph of Maximilian I, marble relief based on wood carvings by Albrecht Dürer

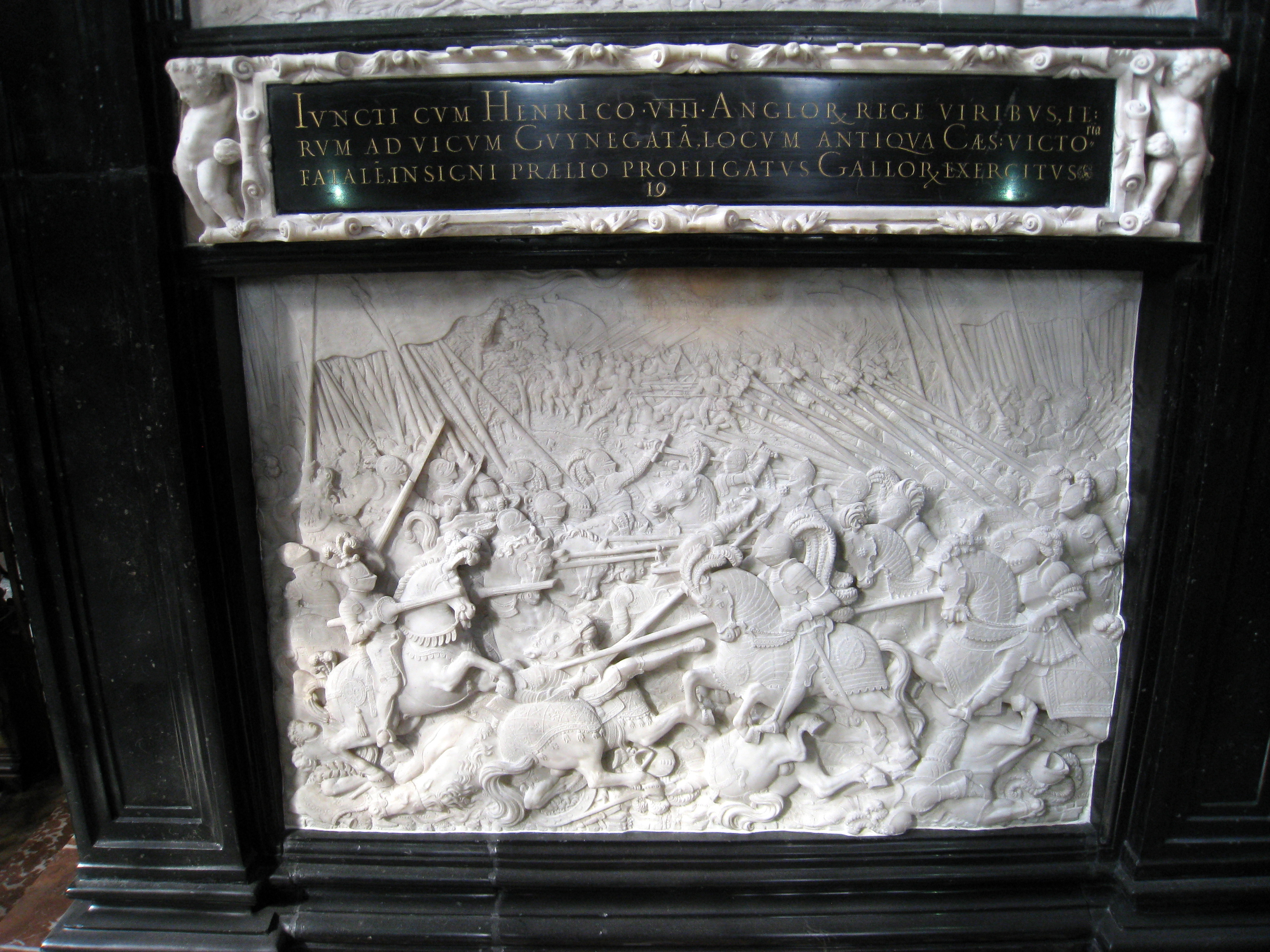
Alexander Colyn, cenotaph of Maximilian I, marble relief based on wood carvings by Albrecht Dürer

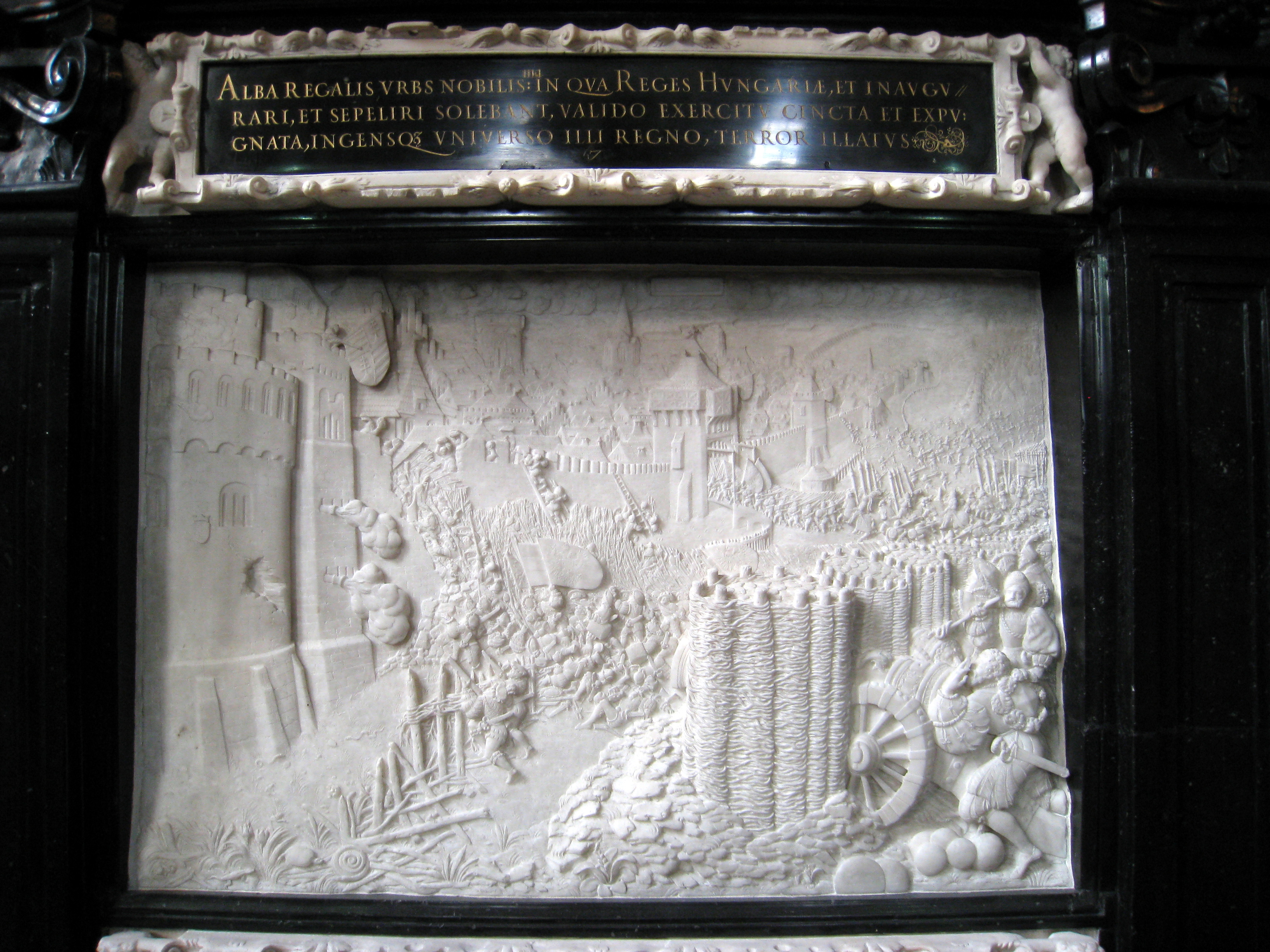
Alexander Colyn, cenotaph of Maximilian I, marble relief based on wood carvings by Albrecht Dürer

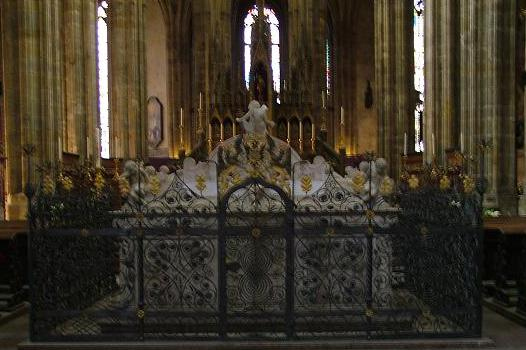
Alexander Colyn, Royal Mausoleum at Prague Castle, tomb of Ferdinand I, Anna and Maximilian II.

== See also ==
- Bernhard, Arnold, and Florian Abel
