= Georg Gossembrot =

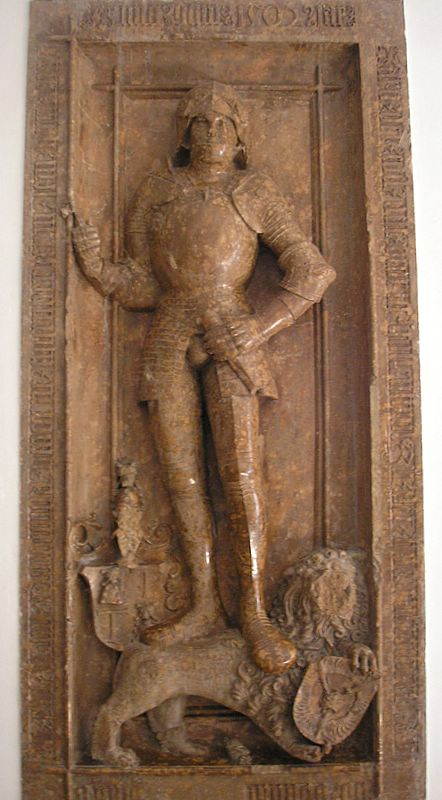
Tombstone of Georg Gossembrot.

Georg Gossembrot or Jörg Gossembrot (circa 1445 in Augsburg – 1502 in Füssen) was a financier, treasurer and financial advisor of Maximilian I, King of the Romans. By 1500, he was the most important "finance-man" of Maximilian's government. His power and close relationship with the king made Gossembrot a target of hatred and envy. He died in 1502, likely poisoned by his enemies.

== Biography ==
Born around 1445, Goerg Gossembrot came from a wealthy and educated Augsburg merchant family. He studied in Ferrara from 1455. Later, he married Radegundis Eggenberger. In 1473, he gave up his citizenship in Augsburg to enter the service of Sigismund, Archduke of Austria.

In 1477, as he gave Archduke Sigismund a loan, Georg Gossembrot was granted the pledge of the Ehrenberg court. Under the care of Gossembrot, the flow of goods was shifted from the Innsbruck – Zirler Berg – Scharnitz – Augsburg route to the Innsbruck – Fernpass – Ehrenberg – Augsburg route. Later – from 1490, when Sigismund's relative, King Maximilian, became the ruler of Tyrol – Gossembrot became the latter's financial advisor. Gossembrot was a benefactor to his environment and was popular with the people. Under his leadership, the court, but especially Reutte, reached its peak. In 1489, Reutte was elevated to market status. In 1500, Gossembrot gifted them the Saint Anna church. Thankful for his generosity, the people of Reutte gifted him an "eternal anniversary".

Being Maximilian's treasurer and governing the finance of courts (the king and his queen, Bianca Maria maintained separate courts) was a hard job, as Maximilian often lacked funds for his many projects. Gossembrot was forced to economize, often at the expense of the queen's court.

Despite his Augsburg origins, Gossembrot tended to keep his distance from the Fuggers, who were also influential financiers to Maximilian's government.

He also became a close personal friend of the king. Gossembrot and Maximilian shared a love of hunting and fishing. Maximilian often came to Ehrenberg to hunt with him.

There are stories about his exceptional strength: it is said Gossembrot could bend horseshoes with bare hands and stop a horse in full gallop.

In 1499, he was ennobled and became a count. In 1502, he died in Füssen im Allgäu, allegedly poisoned with a blood sausage by his enemies. Gossembrot was buried in the chapel he had donated to the monastery of St. Magnus in Füssen. His red marble tombstone can still be seen today. Saddened by the death of his friend, Maximilian came to attend his funeral in Augsburg.

Historian Friedrich Hegi writes that the new count hated the Habsburg councillors and other confidants of the king. Pascale Sutter opines that this could not be proven, but there were probably tensions between the shrew businessman and impoverished dynasts.

After his death, Paul von Liechtenstein, who was closer to the Fuggers, became responsible for court and government finances in Tyrol.
