= Sibylle of Bavaria =

Electress Palatine
- Tenure: 23 February 1511 – 18 April 1519
- Born: 16 June 1489
- Died: 18 April 1519 (aged 29); Heidelberg
- Burial: Church of the Holy Spirit, Heidelberg
- Spouse: Louis V, Elector Palatine (m. 1511)
- Father: Albert IV of Bavaria-Munich
- Mother: Kunigunde of Austria

Sibylle of Bavaria (16 June 1489 – 18 April 1519 in Heidelberg) was a member of the House of Wittelsbach was a princess of Bavaria-Munich and by marriage Electress Palatine.

== Life ==
Sibylle was the daughter of Duke Albert IV of Bavaria-Munich from his marriage to Kunigunde of Austria, daughter of Holy Roman Emperor Frederick III. She married on 23 February 1511 in Heidelberg Elector Palatine Louis V. The couple had no children.

Louis had earlier been engaged to Sibylle's elder sister Sidonie, but Sidonie had died before she could marry, aged 16. The marriage was the starting point of the relaxation of the relations between Bavaria and the Palatinate, which were severely impacted by the Landshut War of Succession. Relationships between the Palatinate and Emperor Maximilian I, who was Sibylle's uncle, also improved and Louis came closer politically to the Contra League.

Sibylle died in 1519 and was buried in the Church of the Holy Spirit in Heidelberg. For a while, Sibylle's inheritance was claimed by her brother Ernest. This claim was denied by her widower and her brother William. Instead, Ernest was promised a high ecclesiastic office.
