= Ernest of Bavaria (disambiguation) =

Ernest of Bavaria may refer to:

- Ernest, Duke of Bavaria (1373–1438), the son of John II and co-ruler with William III
- Ernest of Bavaria (1500–1560), the son of Albert IV and Administrator of Passau
- Ernest of Bavaria (1554–1612), the son of Albert V and Archbishop of Cologne
