= Bianca Maria =

Feminine given name

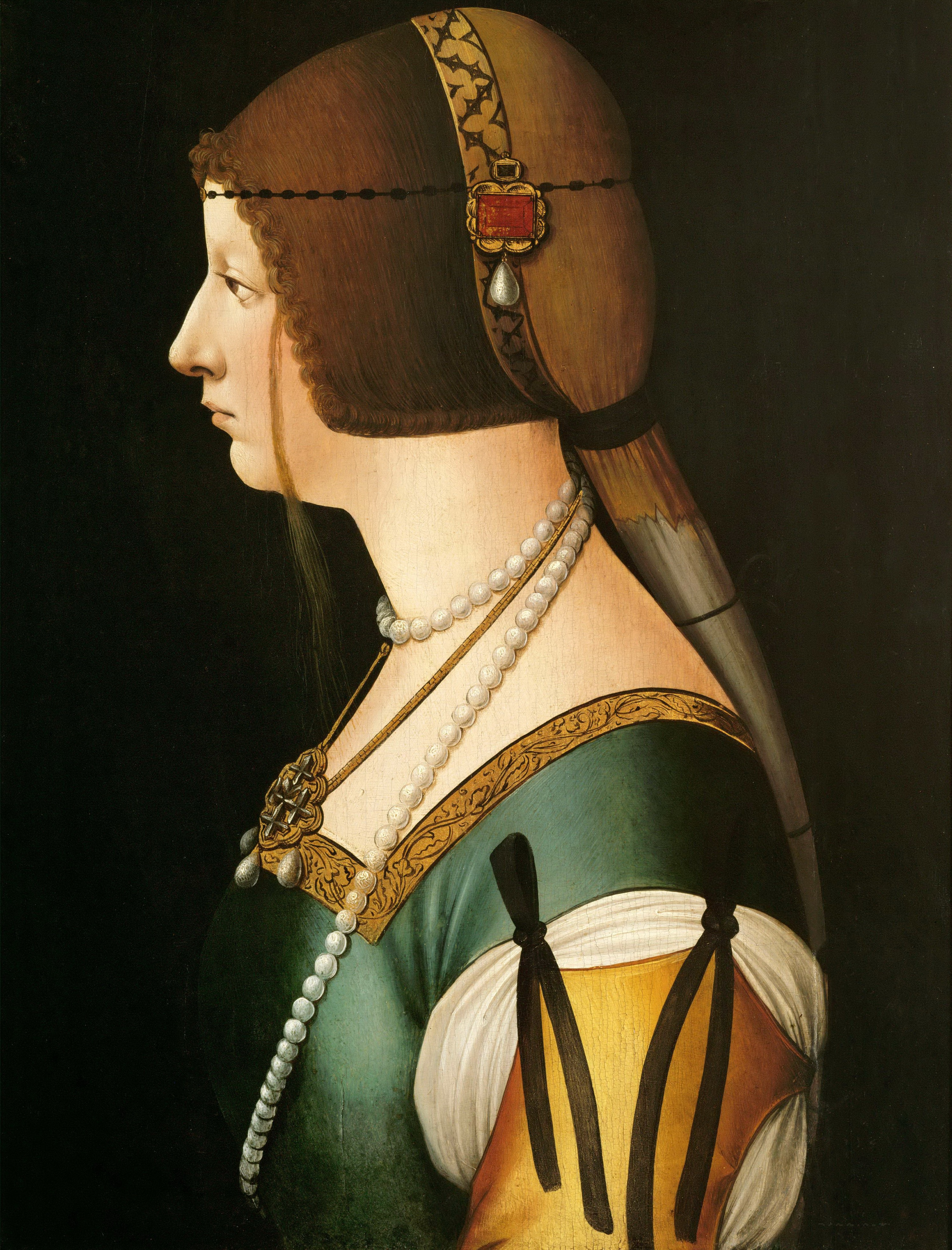
- Bianca Maria Sforza was Holy Roman Empress from 1508 to 1510.
- Gender: Female

Origin
- Meaning: Combination of the names Bianca, meaning "white" and Maria
- Region of origin: Italy, Romania

Other names
- Related names: Blanche, Blanca, Branca

Bianca Maria is a feminine given name, a combination of the Italian name Bianca, which means "white" and is a cognate of the medieval name Blanche and of Maria, a Latin form of the Greek name Μαριαμ or Mariam or Maria, found in the New Testament. The combination name Bianca Maria was the name of early queens or noble women such as Bianca Maria Sforza and Bianca Maria Visconti. The name is still well-used in Italy and Romania, among other countries.

- Bianca Maria Meda (c. 1661–c. 1732), Italian Roman Catholic nun and Baroque composer
- Bianca Maria Piccinino (1924–2025), Italian journalist and television hostess
- Bianca Maria Sforza (1472–1510), Queen of Germany and Holy Roman Empress; wife of Maximilian I, Holy Roman Emperor
- Bianca Maria Visconti (1425–1468), Italian Duchess of Milan; wife of Francesco I Sforza
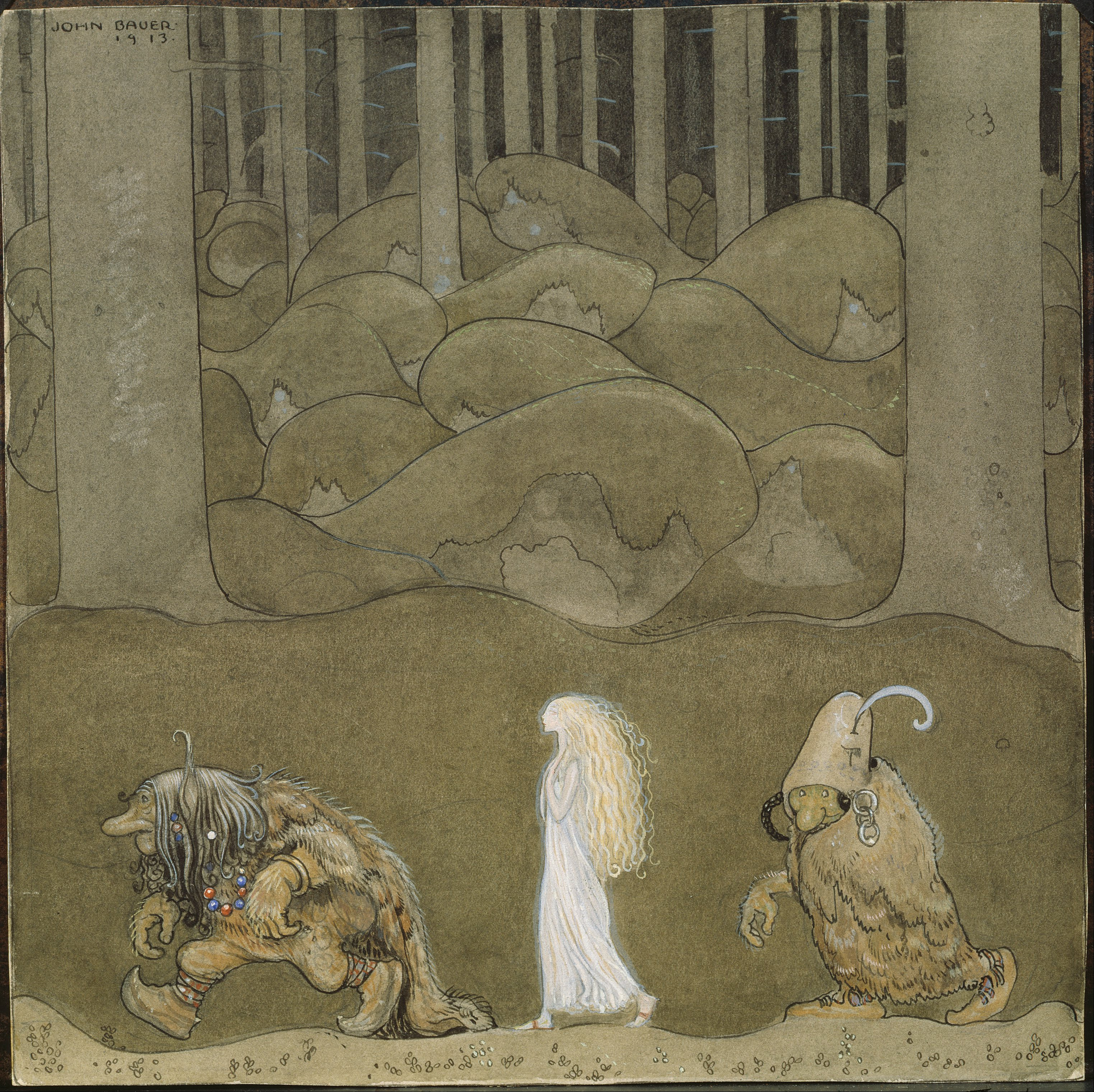
One summer's evening they went with Bianca Maria deep into the forest. by John Bauer

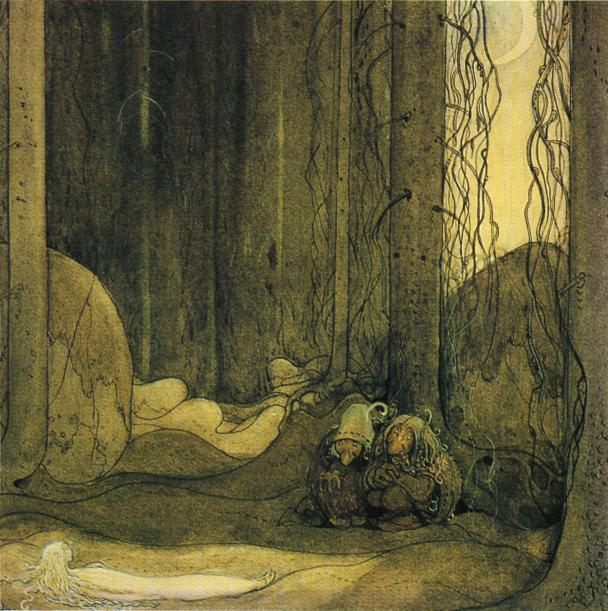
When she woke up again she was lying on the moss in the forest. by John Bauer
