= Wiguleus Fröschl of Marzoll =

- Born: 4 April 1445; Marzoll (today part of Bad Reichenhall)
- Died: 6 November 1517 (aged 72); Passau
- Buried: Passau Cathedral
- Noble family: Fröschl
- Father: Ludwig Fröschl

Wiguleus Fröschl of Marzoll (4 April 1445, in Marzoll (today part of Bad Reichenhall) – 6 November 1517, in Passau) was a German nobleman. From 1500 until his death, he was Prince-archbishop of Passau.

== Life ==
Fröschl descended from a wealthy patrician family from the Bavarian salt-mining town of Reichenhall. His father was the salt magnate Ludwig Frösch; (d. before 1481).

He studied law at the University of Vienna, then went to the papal court in Rome, where he was ordained as priest in 1467. From 1478, he worked in Passau as a canon. He travelled to Rome several times as a mediator in the "third Bishop of Passau" dispute.

From 1480 to 1485, he resided in Vienna, where he held the office of vicar general of Lower Austria. From 1486 to 1490, he was vicar general of Upper Austria. In those days, Upper and Lower Austria belonged to the diocese of Passau.

In 1490, he took over the position of dean of the Passau Cathedral from Christopher of Schachner, who had succeeded as Prince-bishop of Passau. After Christopher died, Fröschl was elected as the 56th Bishop of Passau on 14 January 1500.

Passau was an economically prosperous city. However, the city suffered a serious setback from the devastating floods of 1501. In response, Fröschl introduced a number of legislative reforms, including a reduction of the tax burden on his citizens. In 1503, he called a s diocesan synod to improve the church discipline in his diocese, which had sunk deeply. His goal was to renew the clergy from within. With this attempt, he showed that he was quite open to solving the problems the Catholic church sufferend from on the eve of the Reformation.

He died on 6 November 1517, and was buried in Passau Cathedral.

Wiguleus Fröschl of Marzoll Fröschl Born: 4 April 1445 Died: 6 November 1517
| Preceded by Christopher of Schachner | Bishop of Passau; 1500–1517 | Succeeded by Ernest of Bavaria |
