= Anna Laminit =

German herbalist (1480–1518)

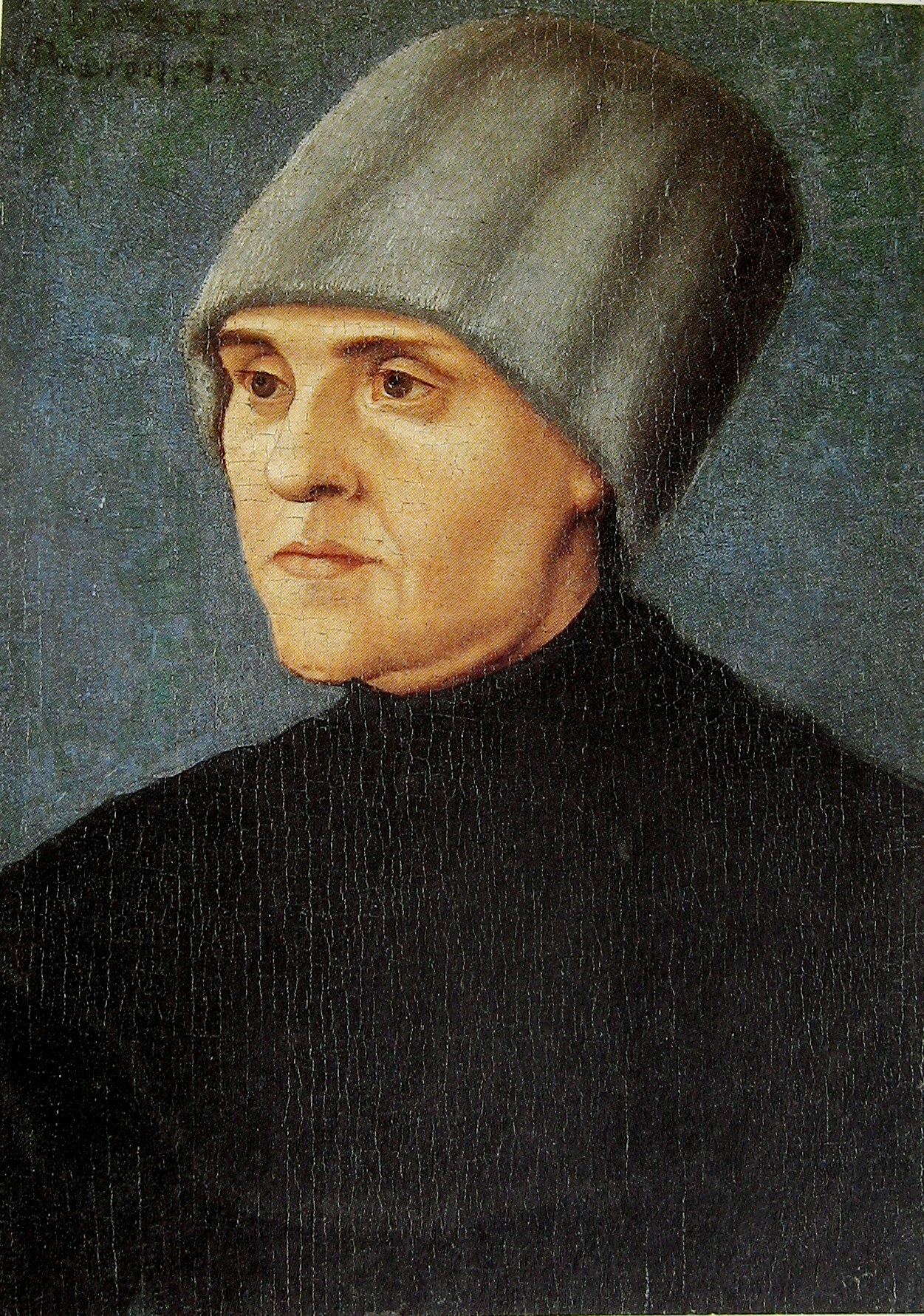
Anna Laminit in 1502, by Hans Burgkmair

Anna Laminit (1480 in Augsburg – 1518) was a German herbalist who posed as a "hunger saint". Her self-declared status as a saint who starves oneself, was accepted by some elite members of society, allowing her opportunity to gain considerable influence over powerful contemporaries, including members of the imperial family. She was exposed by a trap set at the behest of Archduchess Kunigunde, the younger sister of Emperor Maximilian I, to whom Laminit had claimed visions. Following exposure, Laminit was banished from the presence of the emperor and from Austria. She was later executed as a witch for a separate crime that had resulted in a death.

== Biography ==
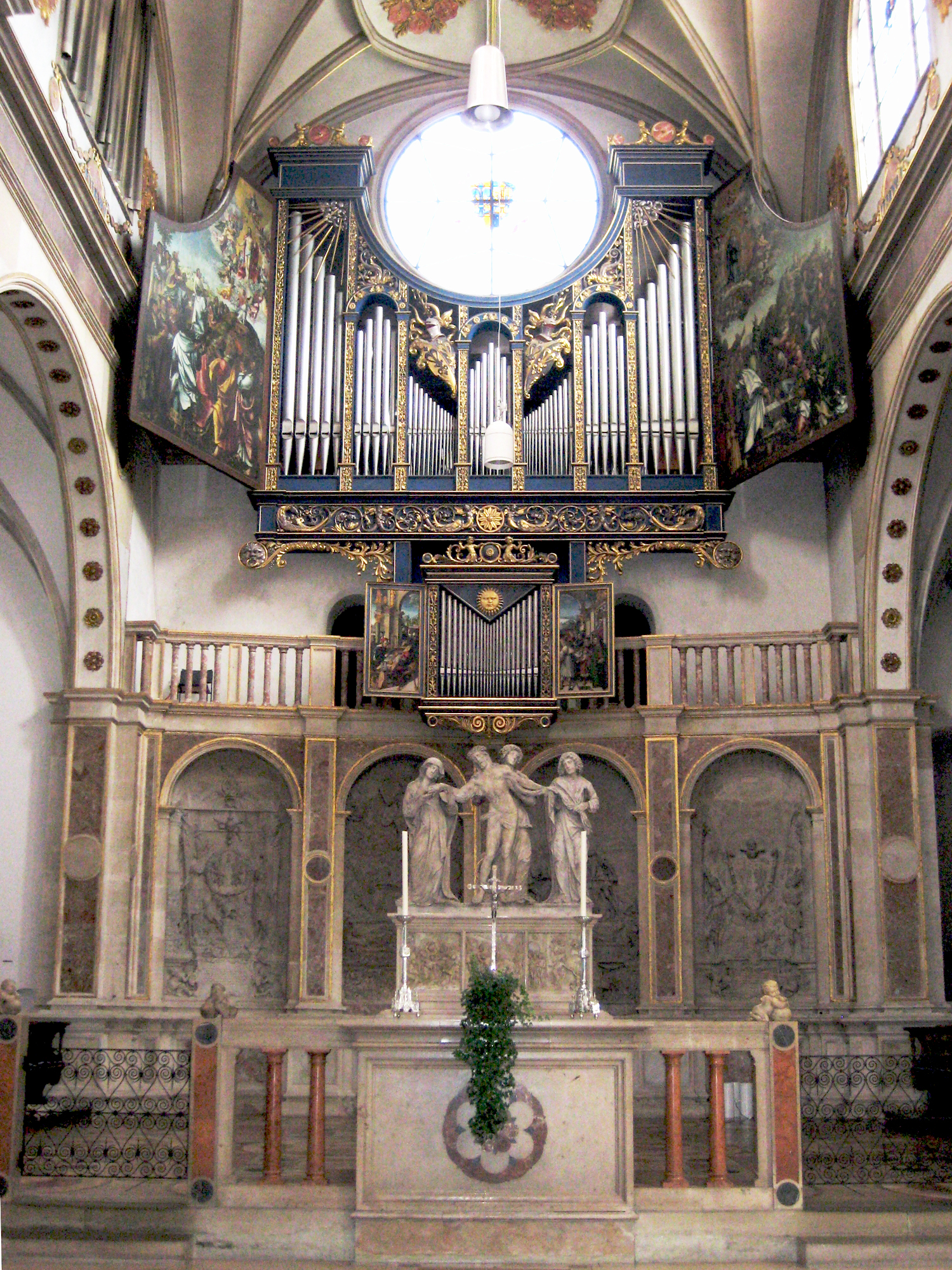
St. Anna's Church, part of the Carmelite Monastery of St. Anna built in 1321. In 1513, Laminit claimed St. Anne had spoken to her and Augsburg would be ruined if pious people did not offer their prayers.

Laminit came from a family of craftsmen in Augsburg. Around 1495–1496, due to her lifestyle, which was considered debauched, she was pilloried, beaten with rods and expelled from the city. Due to contacts to notable persons, in 1497, she was able to return to the city again, where she found refuge in the Seelhaus at the Carmelite Monastery of St. Anne. There she was opportunistic, gleaning from the environment, then establishing herself as a "hunger saint". Laminit then received communion only on Sundays, and pretended to live with no other nourishment. Soon, rumours spread that the prayers presented to her would attain fulfillment through her prayers. Thanks to her fame which lasted for decades, she was able to build for herself a fortune of 1,500–1,600 Gulden.

Laminit managed to approach even Emperor Maximilian himself, who paid personal visits to her and provided her and her maid with clothing. She told him about a vision, in which the Heavenly Father had become angered by the Confederalists due to the blood money matter, and also that God was also displeased by blasphemy and the pledging of heathens. But Jesus Christ and the Virgin had begged him to allow the world to repent. In 1503, Laminit attained her greatest success in persuading Bianca Maria Sforza, Maximilian's Queen (later Empress), to lead a penitent procession with the city's leading officials – probably the largest one the city had ever seen. In 1511, Martin Luther also visited her while he was in Augsburg.

Rumours arose that some people had seen the so-called "saint" eat; Archduchess Kunigunde, younger sister of the emperor, decided to carry out an investigation herself. She invited Laminit to her monastery. When Laminit arrived on 16 October 1512, she was quartered in a guest room, which had been prepared beforehand with peepholes. As soon as the door was locked, Laminit unpacked bags of fruit that she had hidden under the bed. Revealed, Laminit tried to suppress the scandal. On 13 October 1513, Kunigunde demanded a just punishment from the Imperial City Council Of Augsburg. On 30 January 1514, Maximilian personally decreed that Laminit would not be allowed to approach him or the city within a day's travel distance.

Laminit then left Augsburg and moved to Freiburg, where she married a widowed crossbow-maker and established herself as a herbalist. After a new fraud was exposed and one of her herbal drinks caused the death of a person in Freiburg though, she was condemned as a witch and executed by drowning.

== Estimation ==
According to Peter Dinzelbacher, the cause of her downfall was the illegitimate child she had with Anton Welser (a member of the wealthy Welser family and father-in-law to the famous scholar Konrad Peutinger). During the time she stayed in Augsburg, they had a relationship that produced a son, apparently without causing any notable controversy. One day, Welser tracked her down in order to claim their son, whom he wanted to send to a school in Augsburg. Because the boy had died six years previously (during which time Anton Welser continued to pay her alimony), she tried to dupe him by sending her stepson instead, but got discovered. The whole affair went to the court. Other frauds and scandals were then discovered and admitted by Anna under torture.

Jörg Breu the Elder recounted that the emperor, princes and other rich and powerful people had great faith in Anne Laminit while the common people thought little of her. This was compatible with his later fierce criticism of the Church with its material culture and wealthy supporters. Andrew Morrall opines that this was a revealing instance in which a layman displayed distance towards the official religion protected by the Church and supported by the upper echelons of society.
