= Sidonie of Bavaria =

German noblewoman (1488–1505)

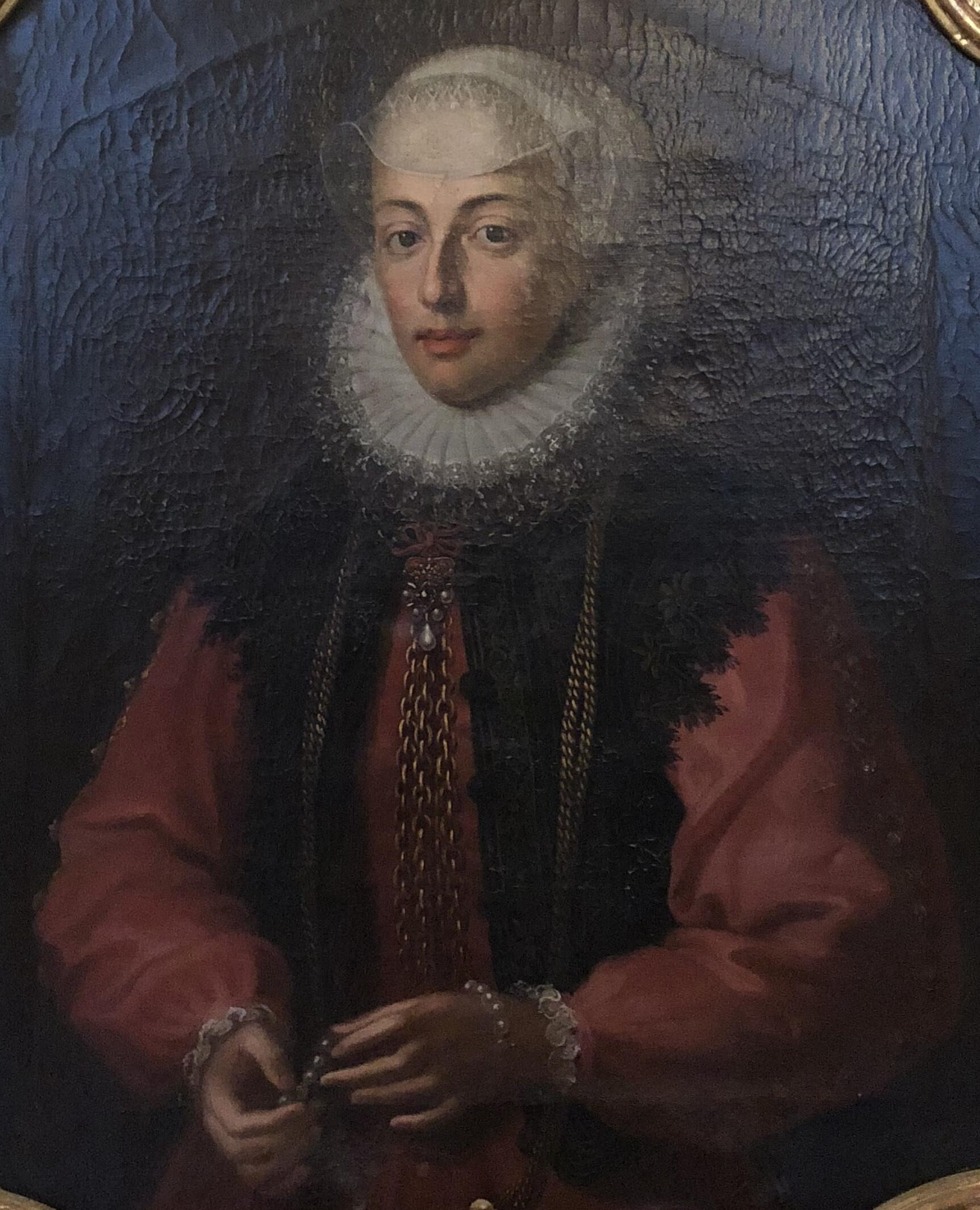
- Born: 1 May 1488; Munich
- Died: 29 March 1505 (aged 16); Munich
- House: House of Wittelsbach
- Father: Albert IV of Bavaria-Munich
- Mother: Kunigunde of Austria

Sidonie of Bavaria (1 May 1488 – 29 March 1505) was a member of the House of Wittelsbach. She was the eldest daughter of Duke Albert IV of Bavaria-Munich and his wife Kunigunde of Austria. She died later as a bride of the Elector Palatine Louis V.

== Life ==
Sidonie was born on 1 May 1488 in Munich. Her father, Albert had been Duke of Bavaria-Munich since 1465. Her mother, Kunigunde was a daughter of Emperor Frederick III. When she was 14 months old, she was promised to Louis of the Palatinate, the oldest son of Count Palatine Philip. A dowry of 32000florins and a dower of 10000florins were agreed upon, and her Wittum was to consist of castle and town of Neuenstadt am Kocher near Heilbronn.

Because of the close relationship of the couple — both descended from the Upper Bavarian Duke Louis II and Louis's mother, Margaret, was a sister of Duke George of Bavaria-Landshut — a papal dispensation was required for this marriage. It was approved in 1491. Pope Innocent VIII had in February 1490 delegated the investigation necessary for this dispensation to bishop Sixtus of Freising and two clergymen from Munich.

In view of the age of the bride, a marriage would not be possible before the year 1500. During this long engagement, the Palatine branch of the Wittelsbachs investigated other options for Louis, such as the French princess Suzanne of Bourbon-Beaujeu and Mary, the daughter of Duke William IV of Jülich and Berg. In 1501 Emperor Maximilian I, who was Kunigunde's brother, suggested that his niece Sidonie could marry Duke Charles of Guelders. None of these options materialized.

The engagement between Sidonie and Louis lasted until her death in late March 1505. It was not broken off when, after the death of Duke George of Bavaria-Landshut in 1503, Bavaria-Munich and the Palatinate found themselves on opposite sides in the Landshut War of Succession. After a rapprochement between the two branches of the House of Wittelsbach, Louis married in 1511 Sidonie's younger sister Sibylle.

Sidonie was buried in the Frauenkirche in Munich.
