= Leonhard Kaiser =

German theologian (1480–1527)

- Born: c. 1480; Raab, Duchy of Bavaria (in modern Austria)
- Died: 16 August 1527 (age about 47); Schärding, Duchy of Bavaria (in modern Austria)
- Cause of death: Execution by burning
- Education: University of Leipzig
- Occupation: Theologian

Leonhard Kaiser (around 1480 – 16 August 1527; also spelled Lienhard, Lenhard, Kaysser, Kayser, Keizer, Käser) was a Lutheran theologian and reformer who was burned as a heretic.

== Biography ==
Kaiser was born in Raab in the Bavarian Innviertel around 1480 to a middle class family. He studied theology at the University of Leipzig, and earned a baccalaureate degree in 1501.

He was ordained as a priest in Passau and, among clerical services, became a vicar in Waizenkirchen. In 1524, he was accused of heresy and jailed, until he recanted. Plagued by a bad conscience, Kaiser moved to Wittenberg where Martin Luther taught and enrolled at the University of Wittenberg in 1525, becoming Luther's student and friend.

He returned to Raab, his home village, in 1527 to see his terminally ill father again. He extended his stay due to his own illness. His Lutheran attitude was reported to Petrus Doerffel von Suben, pastor of Raab. Ernest of Bavaria, who administrated the Diocese of Passau, ordered his arrest at Feste Oberhaus. He was accused and interrogated by Johann Eck and proclaimed his faith in Luther's teachings, namely the sola fide principle, communion in bread and wine, and his rejection of priestly orders and last rites as sacraments, and of the authority of popes and councils. He said that he would recant only when he was proven to be wrong by the Bible. Kaiser wrote a testimony of his convictions titled Grace through Christ.

While imprisoned, he received a letter from Luther, urging him, whether freed or not, to "recognize, bear, love and praise with a good heart the fatherly will of God in him." He received a similar supporting letter from Philip Melanchthon, but it was discovered much later. Several influential rulers, such as John of Saxony and Kasimir of Brandenburg, interceded on his behalf.

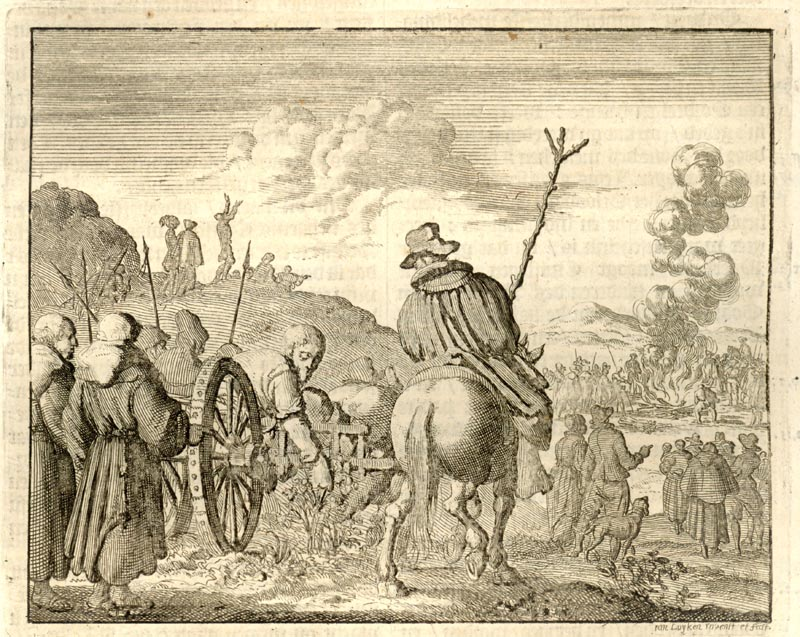
Execution of Kaiser

In a public hearing in front of the Passau Cathedral, on 18 July 1527, Kaiser was declared guilty of heresy, defrocked, and sentenced to death. He was executed by burning on 16 August 1527 in Schärding.

== Legacy ==
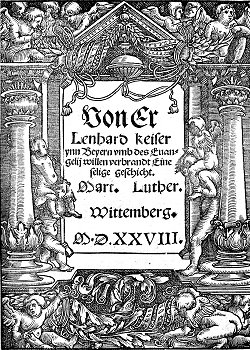
Title page of Luther's Von Er / Lenhard keiser ynn Beyern umb des Evangelij willen verbrandt (1528; Titelblatt)

In December 1527 (dated 1528) Martin Luther published Von Er / Lenhard Keiser ynn Beyern umb des Evangelii willen verbrandt (For honour / Lenhard Keiser burned in Bavaria for the Gospel's sake). Luther based it on Kaiser's reports and his testimony, and also on a written eyewitness account of the trial in Passau and the execution in Schärding. He was greatly moved by the violent death of his student. The work appeared in nine editions.

On the occasion of the 400th anniversary of Kaiser's death, a memorial stone was unveiled on the banks of the Inn outside the gates of Schärding. Its inscription reads: "Leonhard Kaiser, preacher and martyr of the Gospel of Christ; burned at the "Gries" near Schärding on August 16, 1527. Blessed are those who are persecuted for righteousness' sake, for theirs is the kingdom of heaven." (Matthew 5:10).

Leonhard Kaiser's memorial day in the Protestant Calendar of Saints is 16 August.
