= Kunigunde of Austria =

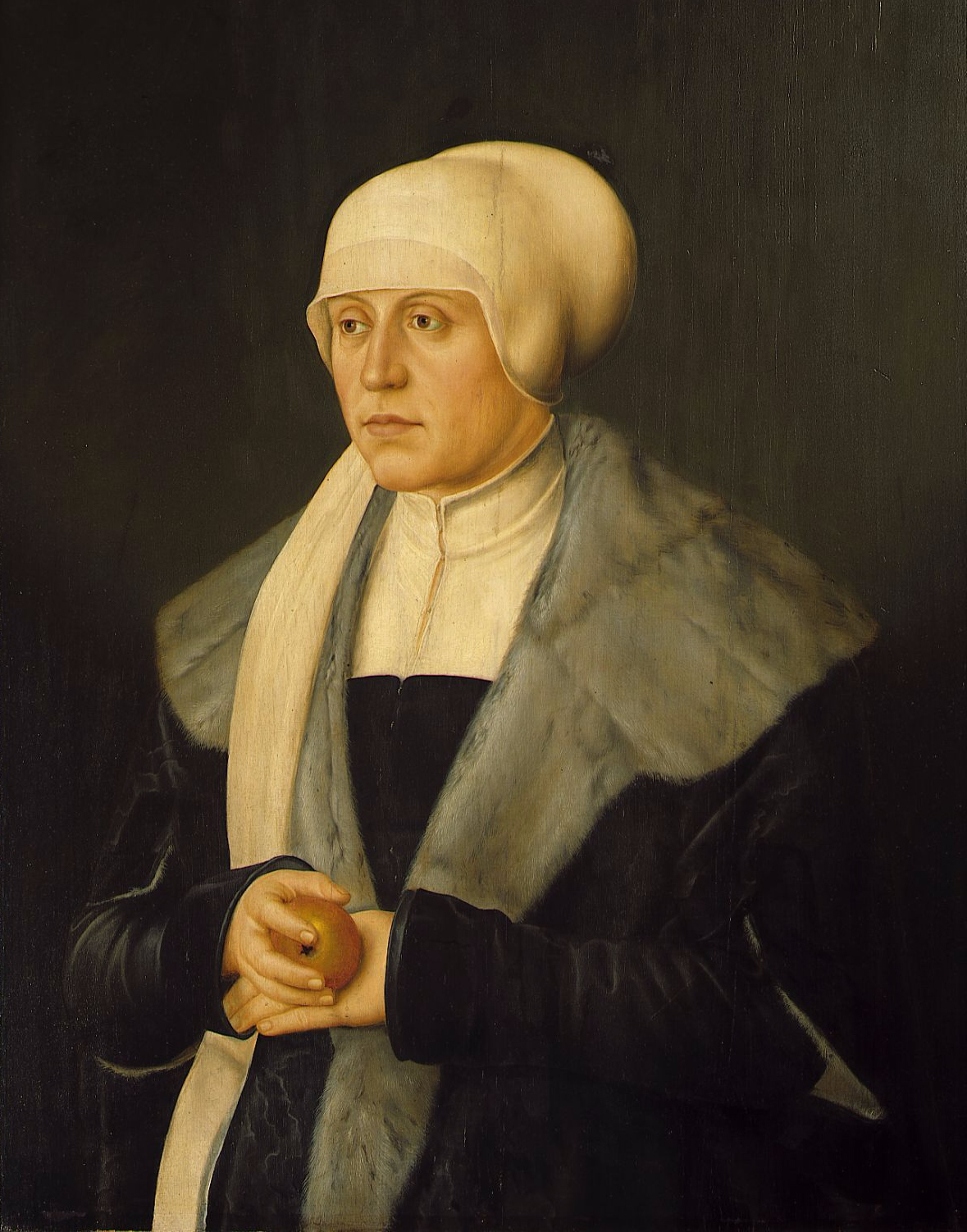
- Portrait by Barthel Beham

Duchess consort of Bavaria
- Tenure: 3 January 1487 – 18 March 1508
- Born: 16 March 1465; Wiener Neustadt, Archduchy of Austria, Holy Roman Empire
- Died: 6 August 1520 (aged 55); Püttrich Convent, Munich, Duchy of Bavaria, Holy Roman Empire
- Spouse: Albert IV, Duke of Bavaria (m. 1487; died 1508)
- Issue: Sidonie of Bavaria; Sibylle, Electress Palatine; Sabina, Duchess of Württemberg; William IV, Duke of Bavaria; Louis X, Duke of Bavaria; Ernest, Archbishop in Salzburg; Susanna, Margravine of Bayreuth and Countess Palatine of Neuburg
- House: Habsburg
- Father: Frederick III, Holy Roman Emperor
- Mother: Eleanor of Portugal

Kunigunde of Austria (16 March 1465 – 6 August 1520), a member of the House of Habsburg, was Duchess of Bavaria from 1487 to 1508 by her marriage to the Wittelsbach duke Albert IV.

== Biography ==
=== Early life ===
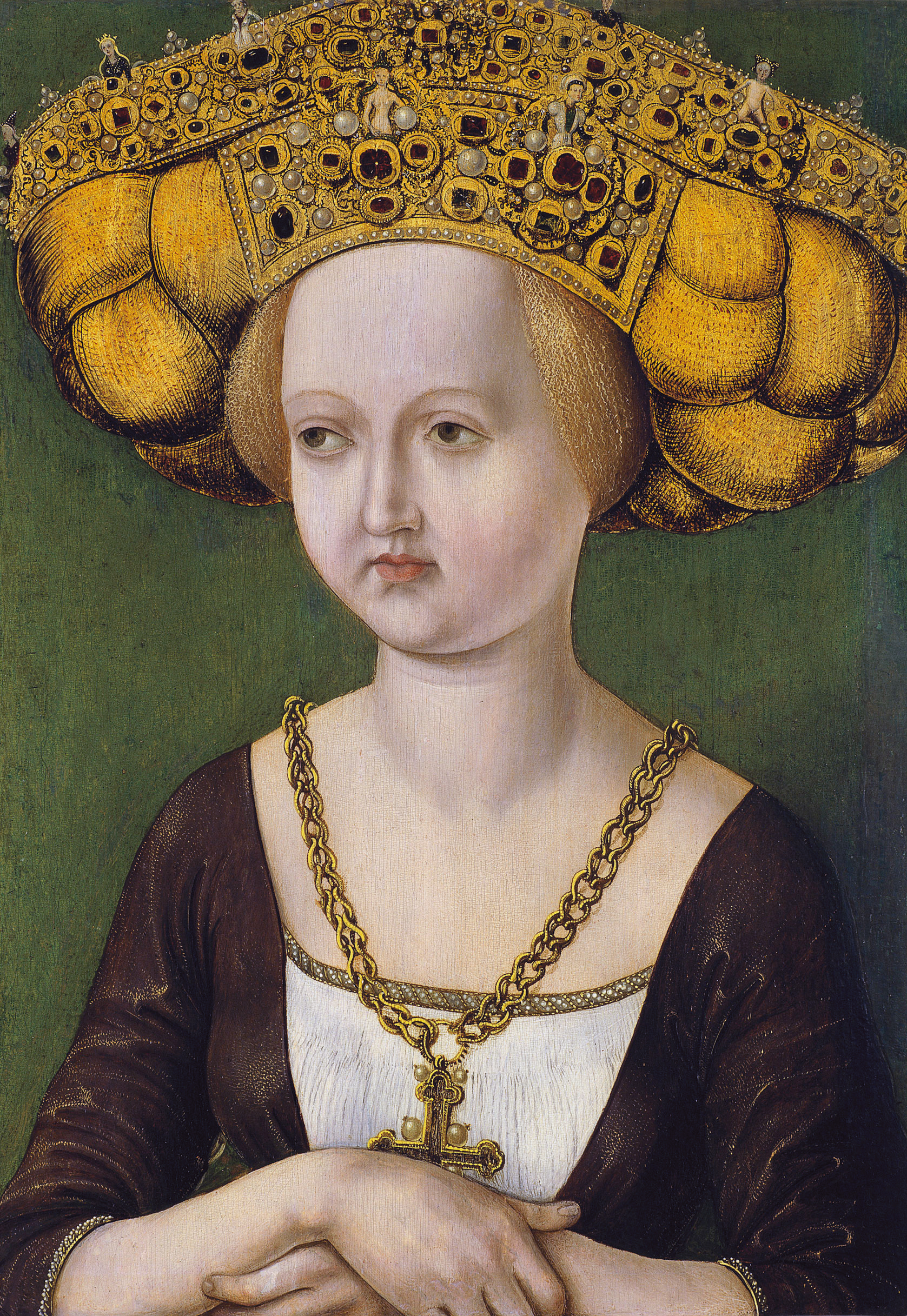
Portrait of young Kunigunde by unknown painter, around 1485

Kunigunde was born in Wiener Neustadt, the fourth of five children to Emperor Frederick III and his wife Eleanor, daughter of King Edward of Portugal. However, only she and her elder brother Maximilian survived to adulthood. Frederick blamed her mother for the deaths of her older siblings, saying that she had fed them too much Portuguese sweet food. When Kunigunde fell ill, Frederick rushed into the women's quarter, took the baby from the cradle and moved her to his own bedchamber, removing her from the mother's supposed harmful care. Eleanor quickly fell ill herself. It is unknown whether mother and child ever saw each other again before her death.

She was raised in Wiener Neustadt and at the Inner Austrian court in Graz, Styria, where she grew up in an informal and open atmosphere, without rigid court etiquette. Contrary to former practice, she learned not only to read, write, and embroider, but also received instruction in riding and hunting, astronomy and mathematics.

Kunigunde's family had left the Imperial residence at the Hofburg in Vienna after lengthy quarrels with Frederick's younger brother Archduke Albert VI of Austria. Though Albert had unexpectedly died in 1463 and the emperor proclaimed a general Landfrieden peace, armed hostilities in the Austrian lands continued.

Like most daughters of royal families, since her early years Kunigunde was involved in the political intrigues of her time. In 1470 the Hungarian king Matthias Corvinus requested her hand; however, Emperor Frederick, a rival for the Crown of Saint Stephen and also for the Lands of the Bohemian Crown, refused him. As her mother had died in 1467, Kunigunde made her formal presentation at the side of her father at the age of fifteen, in 1480, during the visit of Duke George of Bavaria, called "the Rich", to Frederick's court in Vienna. George was solemnly enfeoffed with the Imperial estate of Bavaria-Landshut and after the celebrations Kunigunde was sent to Burggraf Ulrich III von Graben to Graz for her safety; however, after a plot against the emperor was discovered, he moved to Linz and sent Kunigunde to the Tyrolean court in Innsbruck with Archduke Sigismund of Austria, Frederick's first cousin and former ward.

=== Duchess of Bavaria-Munich ===
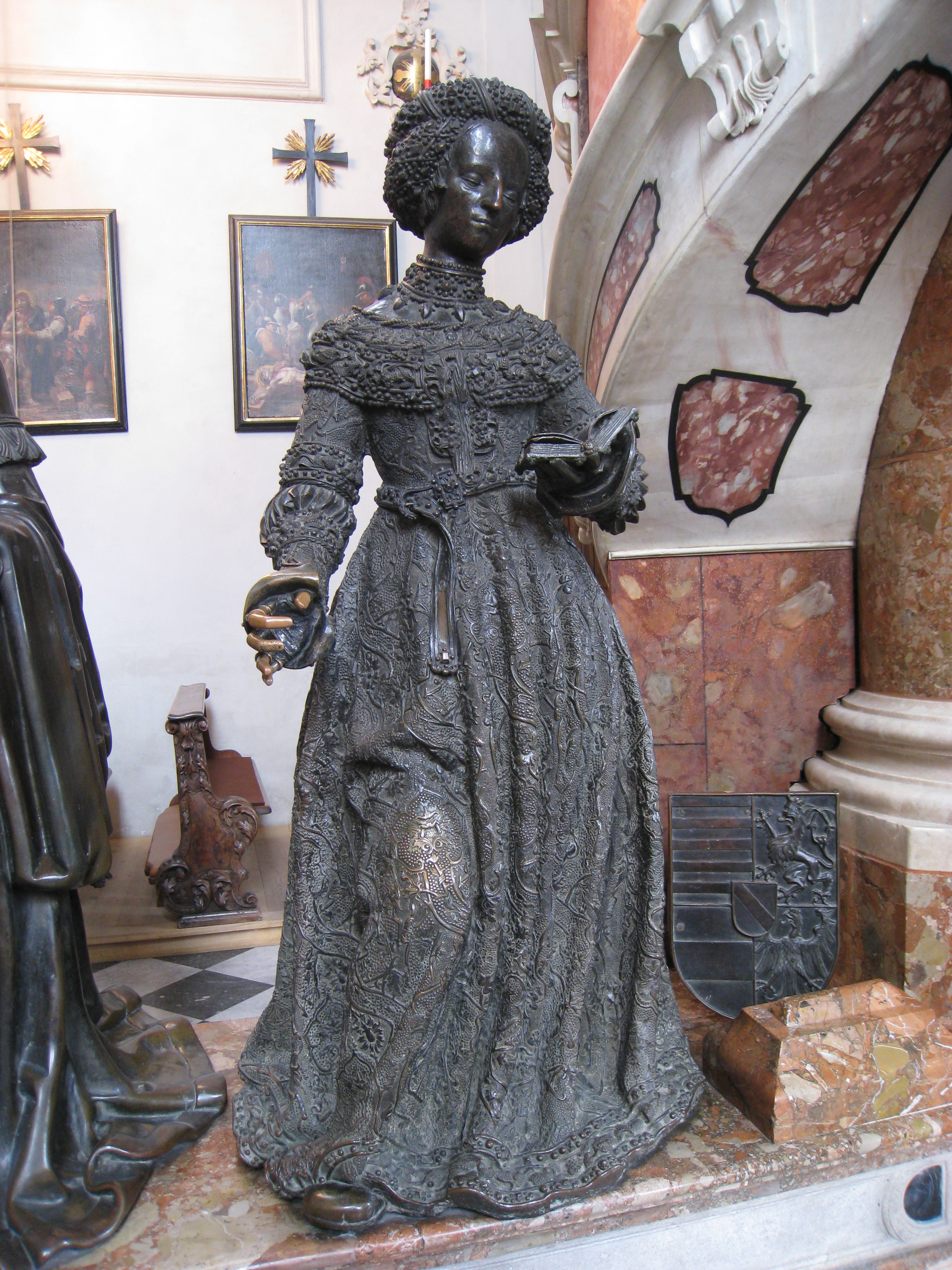
Statue in the Hofkirche, Innsbruck

In Innsbruck Kunigunde met Duke George's cousin, Albert IV, then ruler of Bavaria-Munich and about 18 years her senior, whom she married on 2 January 1487. Her father had initially given his consent, however, when Albert's forces occupied the Imperial City of Regensburg, he changed his mind. The couple wed at the Innsbruck Hofburg residence, against the will of Kunigunde's father. Her brother Maximilian mediated between her and Emperor Frederick; he was able to prevent an imperial ban.

Kunigunde followed her husband to Bavaria and served as joint regent for their eldest son William IV, born in 1493. In spite of her resignation from the Imperial court, she tried to influence the politics of the state as she acted in favour of the rights of her younger sons. She stayed in close contact with her brother, Emperor Maximilian I, and with other rulers and relatives in Europe.

After the death of Albert in 1508 she quickly joined the Convent of Püttrich which she favoured and lived there until her death in 1520.

=== Dowager Duchess ===
Kunigunde was very pious and able to exert influence on her brother on religious matters. In 1509, relying on the influence of Kunigunde, and the Cologne Dominicans, the anti-Jewish agitator Johannes Pfefferkorn was authorized by Maximilian to confiscate all offending Jewish books (including prayer books), except the Bible. The confiscations happened in Frankfurt, Bingen, Mainz and other German cities. Responding to the order, the archbishop of Mainz, the city council of Frankfurt and various German princes tried to intervene in defense the Jews. Maximilian consequently ordered the confiscated books to be returned. On 23 May 1510 though, influenced by a supposed "host desecration" and blood libel in Brandenburg, as well as pressure from Kunigunde, he ordered the creation of an investigating commission and asked for expert opinions from German universities and scholars. The prominent humanist Johann Reuchlin argued strongly in defense of the Jewish books, especially the Talmud.

In 1512, Kunigunde exposed the fraud of the self-appointed saint Anna Laminit of Augsburg (1480-1518), who had duped the population and enriched herself using her fame as a "hunger saint" for decades. Laminit had managed to approach even Maximilian himself, who paid personal visits to her and provided her and her maid with clothing. In 1503, Laminit attained her greatest success in persuading Bianca Maria Sforza, Maximilian's Queen (later Empress), to lead a penitent procession with the city's leading officials – probably the largest one the city had ever seen. However, rumours arose, that some people had seen the "saint" eat. Kunigunde decided to carry out an investigation herself. She invited Laminit to her monastery. When Laminit arrived on 16 October 1512, she was quartered in a guestroom, which had been prepared beforehand with peepholes. As soon as the door was locked, Laminit unpacked bags of fruit that she had hidden under the bed. Despite Laminit trying to cover up the scandal, on 13 October 1513, Kunigunde demanded a just punishment from the Imperial City Council Of Augsburg. On 30 January 1514, Maximilian personally decreed that Laminit would not be allowed to approach him or the city within a day's travel distance. Laminit then arrogantly left Augsburg and moved to Freiburg, where she married a widowed crossbow-maker and established herself as a herbalist. After a new fraud was exposed and one of her herbal drinks caused the death of a person at Freiburg though, she was condemned as a witch and executed by drowning.

Among Kunigunde's four daughters, Sidonie died young, so her sister Sibylle married Louis V, Elector Palatine, who had been betrothed to Sidonie. Susanne married twice – the first husband was a Margrave of Brandenburg, the second a Count Palatine. Sabine was married to Duke Ulrich of Württemberg, as a reward for having supported Albert in the war against George. The marriage turned out to be a disaster. Ulrich was a lazy ruler and a dissolute man who got into debt and physically abused Sabine. When Ulrich murdered the husband of his lover in broad daylight in 1515, it was too much for Kunigunde. She called Sabine back to her and told Maximilian to impose an imperial ban on Ulrich, which her brother did in 1516.

Kunigunde lived her last years in "quiet meditations and pious prayers", also for her brother who died in 1519 (she outlived him for a year).

== Issue ==
With Duke Albert IV of Bavaria, Kunigunde had seven children:

1. Sidonie (1 May 1488 – 27 March 1505). Betrothed to Louis V, Elector Palatine, she died before the wedding took place.
2. Sibylle (16 June 1489 – 18 April 1519), married in 1511 to Louis V, Elector Palatine.
3. Sabina (24 April 1492 – 30 April 1564), married in 1511 to Duke Ulrich I of Württemberg.
4. William IV, Duke of Bavaria (13 November 1493 – 7 March 1550).
5. Louis X, Duke of Bavaria (18 September 1495 – 22 April 1545).
6. Ernest (13 June 1500 – 7 December 1560), an ecclesiastical official in Passau (1517–40), Archbishop in Salzburg (1540–54) and Eichstädt.
7. Susanna (2 April 1502 – 23 April 1543), married firstly in 1518 to Margrave Casimir of Brandenburg and secondly in 1529 to Otto Henry, Count Palatine of Neuburg, since 1556 Elector Palatine.

== Ancestry ==
Ancestors of Kunigunde of Austria

16. Albert II, Duke of Austria
8. Leopold III, Duke of Austria
17. Joanna of Pfirt
4. Ernest, Duke of Austria
18. Bernabò Visconti
9. Viridis Visconti
19. Beatrice Regina della Scala
2. Frederick III, Holy Roman Emperor
20. Siemowit III, Duke of Masovia
10. Siemowit IV, Duke of Masovia
21. Euphemia of Opava
5. Cymburgis of Masovia
22. Algirdas, Grand Duke of Lithuania
11. Alexandra of Lithuania
23. Uliana of Tver
1. Kunigunde of Austria
24. Peter I of Portugal
12. John I, King of Portugal
25. Teresa Lourenço
6. Edward, King of Portugal
26. John of Gaunt, 1st Duke of Lancaster
13. Philippa of Lancaster
27. Blanche of Lancaster
3. Eleanor of Portugal
28. John I of Castile
14. Ferdinand I, King of Aragon
29. Eleanor of Aragon
7. Eleanor of Aragon
30. Sancho Alfonso, 1st Count of Alburquerque
15. Eleanor of Alburquerque
31. Beatrice of Portugal
