= Bianca Maria Sforza =

Holy Roman Empress from 1508 to 1510

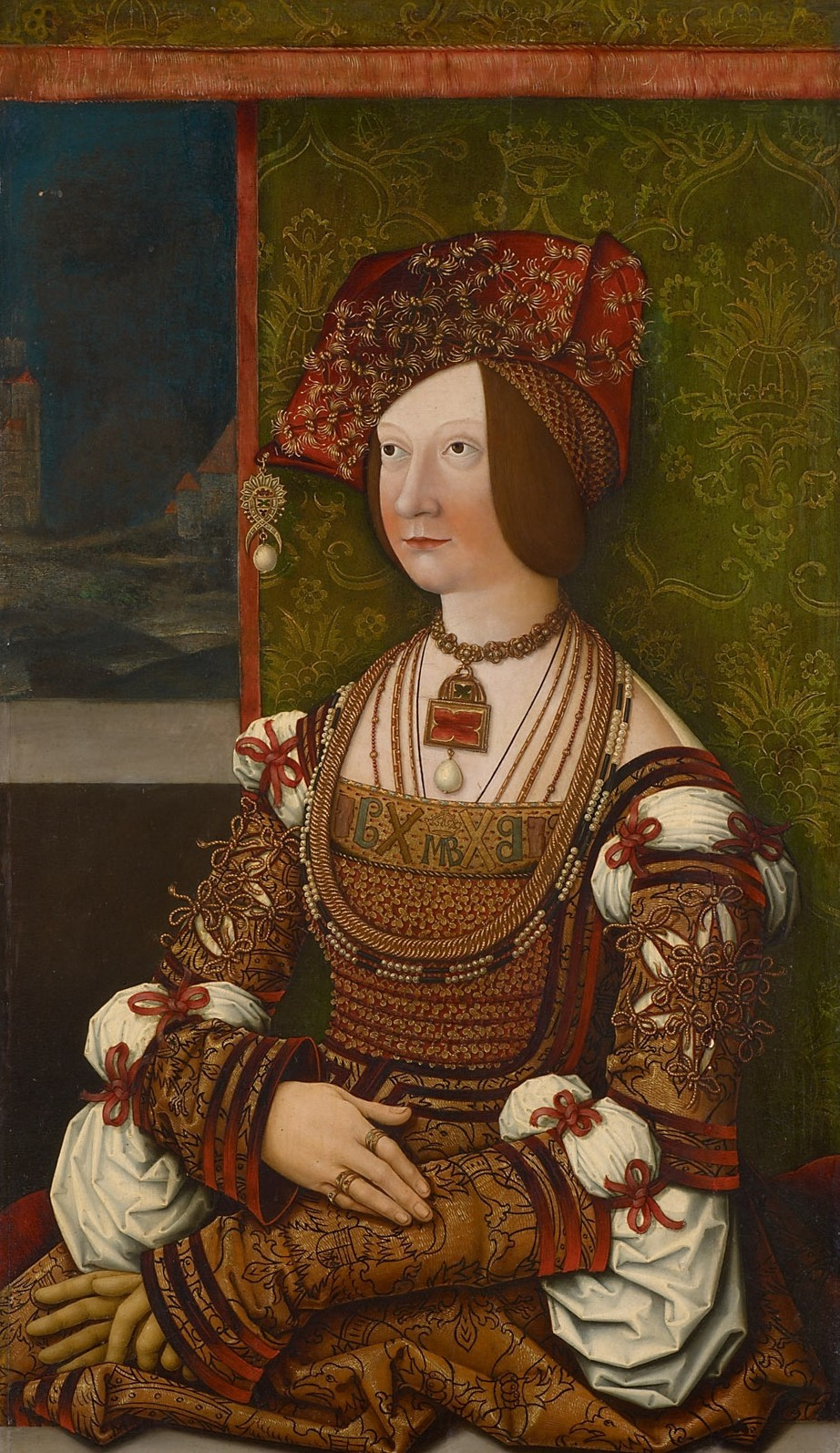
- Portrait by Bernhard Strigel, c. 1505/1510

Holy Roman Empress
- Tenure: 4 February 1508 – 31 December 1510

Queen of the Romans Archduchess consort of Austria
- Tenure: 16 March 1494 – 31 December 1510

Duchess consort of Savoy
- Tenure: 6 January 1474 – 22 September 1482
- Born: 5 April 1472; Pavia
- Died: 31 December 1510 (aged 38); Innsbruck
- Burial: Stams
- Spouse: Philibert I, Duke of Savoy (m. 1474; died 1482); Maximilian I, Holy Roman Emperor (m. 1494)
- House: Sforza
- Father: Galeazzo Maria Sforza
- Mother: Bona of Savoy

Bianca Maria Sforza (5 April 1472 – 31 December 1510) was Queen of Germany and Empress of the Holy Roman Empire as the third wife of Maximilian I. She was the eldest legitimate daughter of Duke Galeazzo Maria Sforza of Milan by his second wife, Bona of Savoy.

== Early life ==
Bianca was born in Pavia as the eldest daughter of Duke Galeazzo Maria Sforza of Milan, by his second wife, Bona of Savoy. She was named after her paternal grandmother, Bianca Maria Visconti. When Bianca was not yet five years old, her father was assassinated inside the Church of Santo Stefano in Milan on 26 December 1476, which was the Feast Day of St. Stephen. He was stabbed to death by three high-ranking officials of the Milanese court.

On 6 January 1474 the 21-month-old Bianca was betrothed to her first cousin Duke Philibert I of Savoy, (Note: Joni Hand states they were married in 1476.) the son of her uncle Amadeus IX of Savoy, and Yolande of France. Duke Philibert I died in the spring of 1482, leaving Bianca a widow at the age of ten. She returned to Milan, under the tutelage of her uncle Ludovico Il Moro, who cared little about her education and allowed her to indulge her own interests, mainly needlework.

On 31 July 1485, the engagement between Bianca and John Corvinus, the only (although illegitimate) son of King Matthias Corvinus of Hungary, was formally announced. With this marriage, the Hungarian ruler wanted to secure his son's future inheritance of Hungary and Bohemia and to make him Duke of Austria. The marriage by proxy was signed on 25 November 1487, and according to the terms of the contract, Bianca received several Hungarian counties. However, due to the opposition and intrigues of Queen Beatrix, wife of King Matthias, the formal marriage never took place. In March 1492, a marriage between Bianca and King James IV of Scotland was considered, but the idea was soon abandoned.

== Queen and empress ==
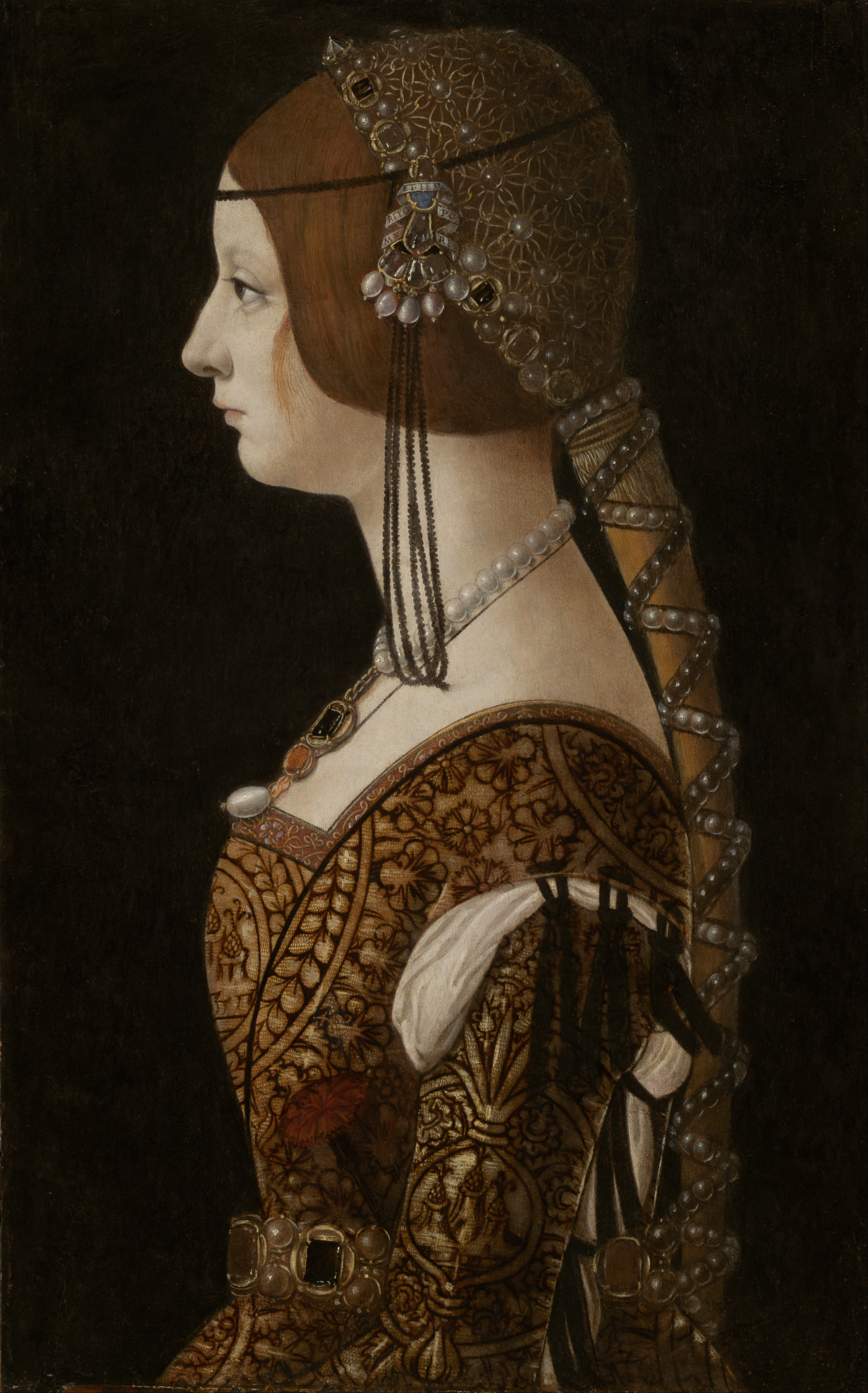
Portrait of Bianca Maria Sforza by Ambrogio de Predis. The coazzone hairstyle with a long plait in the back was popular in Milan during the Italian Renaissance.

On 16 March 1494 in Hall, Tyrol, Bianca married her second husband, the widowed King Maximilian I of Germany. Bianca's second marriage was arranged by her uncle Ludovico Sforza, who wanted recognition and the title of duke confirmed by Maximilian; in exchange, Maximilian received a large dowry along with Bianca, 400,000 ducats. Her magnificent retinue on her way to her wedding aroused much attention. At her wedding, Bianca wore a bodice "with eighty pieces of the jeweler's art pinned thereon, with each piece consisting of one ruby and four pearls". Maximilian's claim to overlordship of Milan angered Anne of France, regent for her brother, King Charles VIII of France, and brought about French intervention in Italy, thus inaugurating the lengthy Italian Wars.

The union was unhappy: shortly after the consummation of the marriage, Maximilian complained that Bianca may have been more beautiful than his first wife, Duchess Mary of Burgundy, but was not so wise. It was impossible for the young bride to win the affection of her husband, who considered her too uneducated, talkative, naive, wasteful with money, and careless. She very much liked her stepchildren Philip the Handsome and Margaret, but, as was remarked by Hermann Wiesflecker, Bianca Maria remained "all her life a child who played while sitting on the floor" and was criticized for forgetting the dignity of her position as Maximilian's spouse. According to Daniel Unterholzner, although there were early rumours of pregnancies, Bianca apparently could not become pregnant (the time she shared with Maximilian was already little, due to his busy schedule, and decreased more and more). The reasons for this were not certain, although she seemed to be angry with her doctor Battista Baldironi for this problem; however, according to Italian biographer and journalist Daniela Pizzagalli, Bianca in fact became pregnant soon after her wedding, but she had a miscarriage three months later on her way to Flanders in June 1494; if this event really took place, it probably impaired Bianca's ability to conceive again. Maximilian had always concentrated on the children of his first marriage in terms of succession politics from the beginning, despite this policy being very risky as he had only one male child, Philip the Handsome (after whose early death in 1506, he would concentrate on Charles and Ferdinand, his grandsons). Her childlessness made Bianca lose one of her important areas of responsibility as the female head of their family. Although the marriage was a failure even in the beginning, at this point, Maximilian was eager to show his subjects in the Low Countries that he had a new wife. It was also the period in which Philip turned 16 and had fully taken charge of the government. Thus various events were staged to celebrate these facts.

After 1500, Maximilian lost all interest in Bianca. She lived with her own court of Milanese people in various castles in Tyrol. On several occasions, he left her behind as security when he could not pay for his rooms on trips (although this is disputed by historian Sabine Weiss, according to whom she was only left behind if it was related to her own debt.) Maximilian took the title of emperor-elect of the Holy Roman Empire in 1508, making Bianca empress.

Recent research, however, indicates that Bianca was an educated woman who had a political role as a mediator for different kinds of agendas, both involving Ludovico Sforza and Maximilian. Unterholzner notes that while the emperor did not love her and sent few letters (a 1499 letter explained the reason Maximilian did not come to the defence of her uncle Ludovico; another, sent in 1504, informed her of his victory against the Kufstein fortress), there was contact between them and he supported her rights in numerous cases, notably concerning her preces primariae. Sometimes, he sent her deceiving words, such as in 1508, when he explained to her that she should not appear at his coronation ceremony because he would bring her along when crowned at Rome next year anyway. (The previous year, they marched together to the Reichstag in [Konstanz] to prepare for the 1508 coronation.) At this point, the once richest bride of Europe had become an emaciated woman who lost all sense of etiquette and all will to live. When he knew that she was near her death, he sent a medicus who tried to give her a bloodletting, but she refused. Maximilian did not try to soothe her with words.

Empress Bianca died at Innsbruck on 31 December 1510. She was buried at Stams. Her husband did not attend her funeral or even dedicate a gravestone to her. The official cause of death was given as excessive consumption of snails. Joseph Grünpeck, the court historian of Maximilian, said that she died "dehydrated" (cachexia) and the ultimate blame laid with the husband's neglect of her. Maximilian and his court wore black in commemoration of her death however, and they still wore black at the Battle of the Spurs (1513).

In Maximilian's horoscope, the astrologer had predicted that in his third epoch of life, he would meet a very young woman of good faith, "devoted to her husband, decent, and righteous", and who would bring him benefits and prosperity, but she would be sickly and unhappy. Größing remarks that this reflects Bianca very well.

=== The queen's court and public events ===
Bianca had her own court of 150–200 people, and she was considered extravagant, but Maximilian did not let her get control of her own finances and thus one minute she lived in luxury and the next her court was a show of poverty.

Church festivals gave the form of the annual cycle at Bianca's court. Easter, Christmas, as well as Pentecost and Corpus Christi, were celebrated with particular lavishness. Carnivals, dances, tournaments, weddings, mummeries, music, entrances, theatre, hunting, and fishing were integral parts of the queen's (later empress) court life. Her first hofmeisterin, appointed in 1493, was Violanta Cayma, who followed her from Italy, enjoyed the trust of both Maximilian and Bianca, and played a key role in correspondence with the Milanese court. In 1494, Niklas von Firmian became the Hofmeister. His wife Paula Cavalli (von Firmian) was Cayma's successor.

In 1503, Bianca was persuaded by the pseudo-mystic of Augsburg, Anna Laminit (who claimed to be a "hunger saint" and had managed to dupe even her husband Maximilian), to lead a penitent procession with the city's leading officials—probably the largest one the city had ever seen. Later, Laminit's fraud would be exposed by Maximilian's younger sister Kunigunde in October 1512. In 1514, Maximilian expelled Laminit from Augsburg. After continuing to engage in fraudulent behaviours, she was condemned as a witch and executed by drowning.

She attended public events in Freiburg several times. In 1498, she inspected the troops together wỉth Maximilian. At the end of that year, she took care of the funeral of Veit von Wolkenstein.

== In current research ==
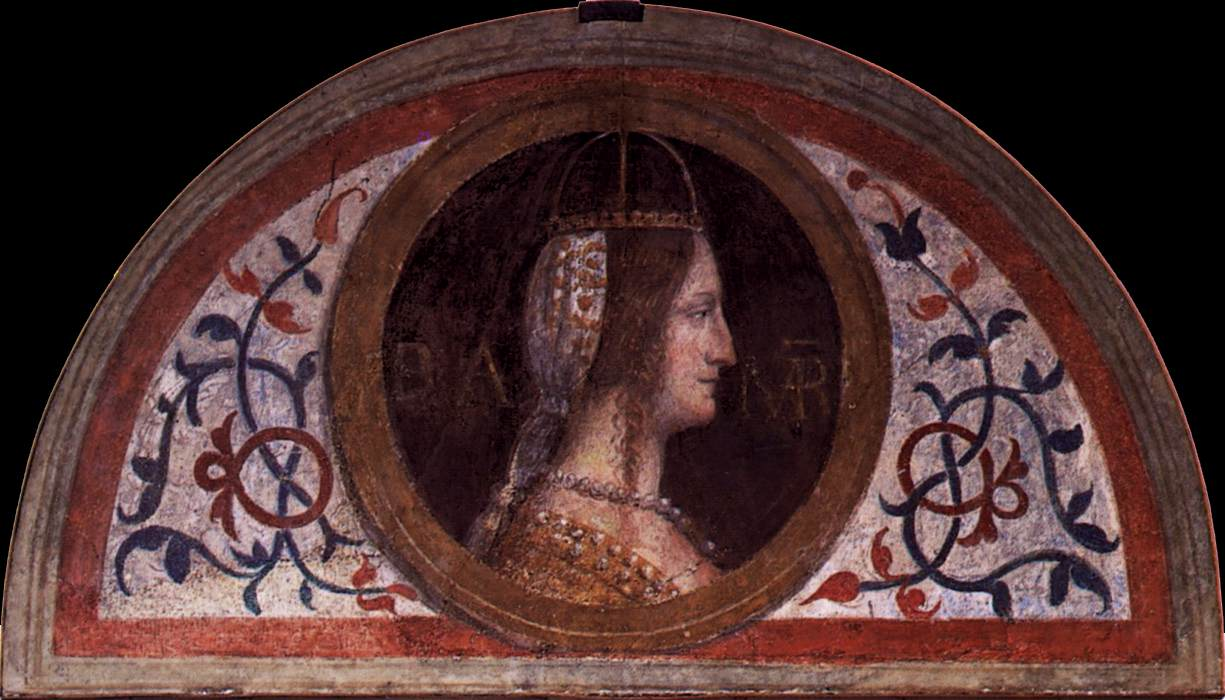
Fresco of Empress Bianca Maria Palazzo degli Atellani in Milan, early 16th century, by Bernardino Luini

Joachim Whaley remarks that "Traditionally dismissed as unimportant compared with her predecessor, Maria of Burgundy, Bianca Maria now appears a much more interesting figure who made the best of a court plagued by money shortages and in some ways blighted by her lack of children."

Traditionally, (influenced by the opinion of the premier historian on Maximilian, Hermann Wiesflecker) Maximilian's administrative reforms in Austria and Germany (such as the Imperial Reform) have been believed to follow the Burgundian model. Today, there is a wider range of opinions. Franca Leverotti notes that there was a change after the wedding of Bianca and Maximilian in 1494 (also when Milan personnel were imported together with her) — the administrative reforms began to take shape under the influence of the Milanese model rather than the Burgundian one. Noflatscher opines that Bianca did have a moderating role vis-à-vis the influence of the Burgundian model, although she could never fully exert her power.

According to Nicole Riegel, after Bianca's death in 1510, building activities for Maximilian's imperial residence project (which had been ongoing for almost two decades) in Innsbruck completely ceased, suggesting that the project was tied to their marriage. Only after 1506, when the Hungarian double wedding happened with the appearance of the two brides Mary of Hungary and Anna of Bohemia and Hungary, new reparations began again.

== In arts and media ==
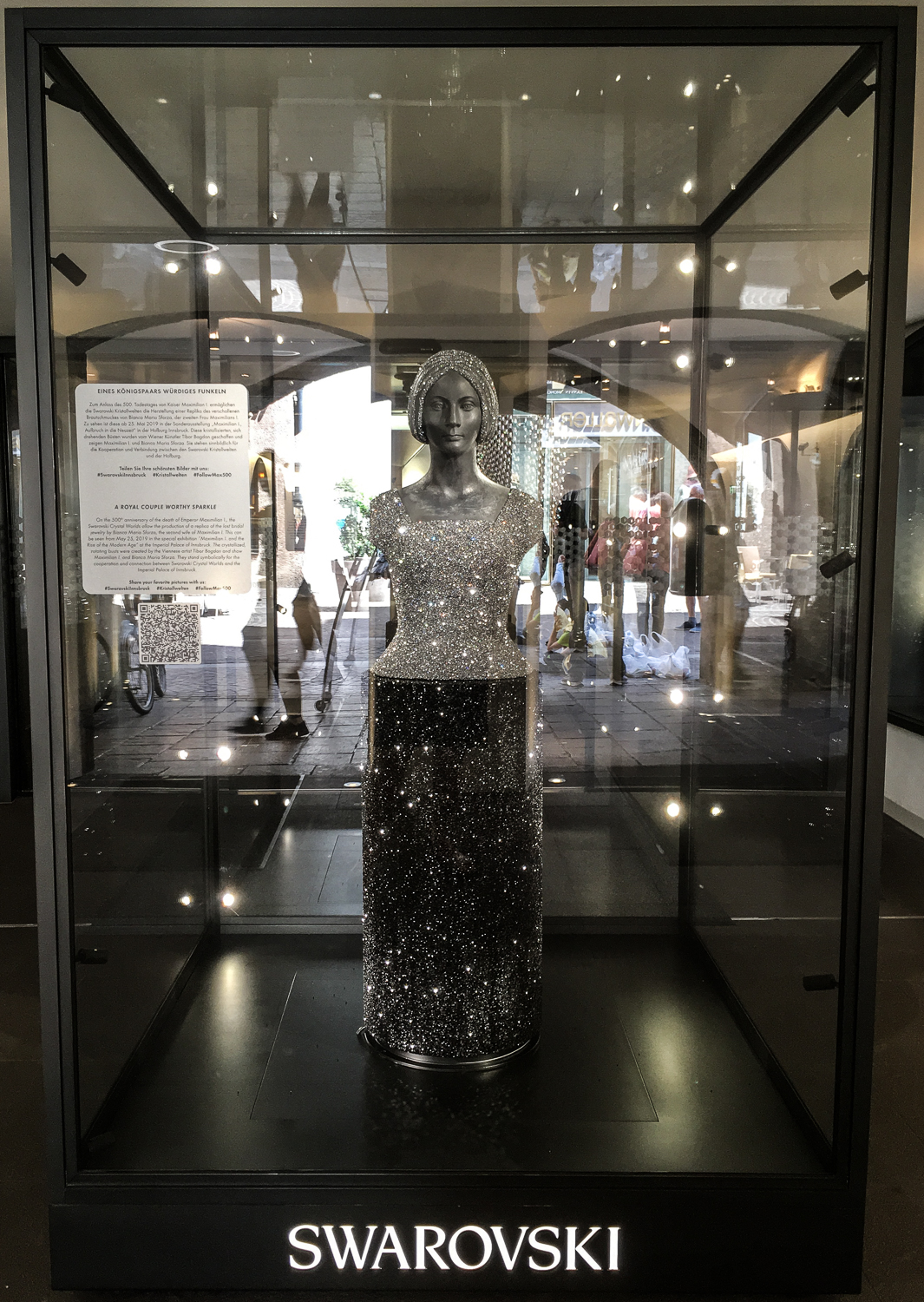
The Swarowski bust of Bianca Maria Sforza created by Tibor Bogdan

- The Wedding Hours made for Bianca Maria Sforza and Maximilian I is a wedding gift from her uncle Ludovico. Only recently discovered after having been long lost, the work "not only testifies to the high level of Renaissance art made for the Sforza family in Milan, but also shows how art was used to link social, religious, and political life."
- La Bella Principessa is attributed by several scholars to be a portrait of Bianca Maria by Leonardo da Vinci.
- In 1993, Gernot and Barbara Rumpf created new imperial portrait for the Kaiserbrunner in Konstanz originally built by Konstanz's sculptor Hans Baur (1829–1897) in 1892. The original portraits were those of four emperors representing four great dynasties: Heinrich III (Franks), Friedrich Barbarossa (Hohenstaufen), Maximilian I (Habsburg) und Wilhelm I (Hohenzollern). All the portraits were melted down during World War II. The Rumpfs reintroduced Maximilian and Barbarossa, with a touch of caricature. Bianca Maria and Emperor Otto I were added. Maximilian is shown extending his hand like a beggar, while a bird on the bonnet of the empress sometimes spits water into his hand, seemingly symbolizing their loveless and money-based marriage and alluding to his never-ending financial troubles.
- Bianca Maria is the main character of the 2019 musical Schattenkaiserin (The shadow empress) by Jürgen Tauber und Oliver Ostermann. Bianca Maria is portrayed as a tragic character, while Maximilian is portrayed as a cold, adulterous husband who married Bianca for money and then abandoned her to focus on wars, other lovers, and extravagant pursuits. The musical received three nominations for the German Musical Theatre Prize 2020/2021 (due to the coronavirus crisis, the price covers both the 2019/2020 and 2020/2021 seasons) for composition, stage design and costume and won the prize for stage design. The libretto writer Susanne Felicitas Wolf sees her as a traumatized child who had to deal with her scars, and also a person with great tenacity and capacity of love. She functioned for her husband only as a figurehead expected at certain occasions, while he sealed himself emotionally in order to be able to go his own way.
- In 2019, The jewelry producer Swarovski created a replica of her lost bridal jewellery, displayed on her bust portrait (paired with Maximilian's bust) created by Viennese artist Tibor Bogdan.

== Commemoration ==
- The empress is commemorated by various folk festivals in South Germany and Austria (especially by cities she had visited when she was alive), usually portrayed by a reenactor and paired with her husband), including the Oktoberfest in Munich, the Weißenauer Fest In Ravensburg, the Tänzelfest in Kaufbeuren, the festivals in Füssen (where she spent her happiest days—her honeymoon—in 1493, and where she wept when meeting him again in 1498), in Mindelheim, in Reutte, in Rattenberg.

== See also ==
- Bianca Maria, information about the name itself

== Sources and literature ==
- Andics, Hellmut (1985). Die Frauen der Habsburger. (in German). Vienna: J&V.
- Größing, Sigrid-Maria (2002). Maximilian I – Kaiser–Künstler–Kämpfer (in German). Vienna: Amalthea. ISBN 3-85002-485-7.
- Hand, Joni M. (2013). Women, Manuscripts and Identity in Northern Europe, 1350–1550. Ashgate Publishing.
- King, Ross (2012). Leonardo and the Last Supper. Bloomsbury.
- Leitner, Thea (2005). Habsburgs Goldene Bräute (in German). Piper.
- Pizzagalli, Daniela (2006). La dama con l'ermellino. Vita e passioni di Cecilia Gallerani nella Milano di Ludovico. Translated by P. Drzymała (in Polish). Poznań: REBIS Publishing House. ISBN 83-7301-825-5.
- Unterholzner, Daniela (2015). Bianca Maria Sforza (1472–1510) : herrschaftliche Handlungsspielräume einer Königin vor dem Hintergrund von Hof, Familie und Dynastie (in German). Leopold-Franzens-Universität Innsbruck.
- Wiesflecker, Hellmut (1991). Maximilian I: Die Fundamente des habsburgischen Weltreiches (in German). Vienna/Munich: R. Oldenbourg. ISBN 3-7028-0308-4, 3-486-55875-7
- Lubkin, Gregory (1994). A Renaissance Court: Milan Under Galleazzo Maria Sforza. University of California Press.

Bianca Maria Sforza House of Sforza Born: 5 April 1472 Died: 31 December 1510
Royal titles
Vacant Title last held by Eleanor of Portugal	Holy Roman Empress; 1508–1510	Vacant Title next held by Isabella of Portugal
Vacant Title last held by Eleanor of Portugal	Queen consort of Germany; 1494–1510	Vacant Title next held by Isabella of Portugal
Vacant Title last held by Yolande of France	Duchess consort of Savoy; 1474–1482	Vacant Title next held by Blanche of Montferrat
