= Ernest of Bavaria (1500–1560) =

German administrator of Passau and Salzburg, pledge lord of the County of Glatz

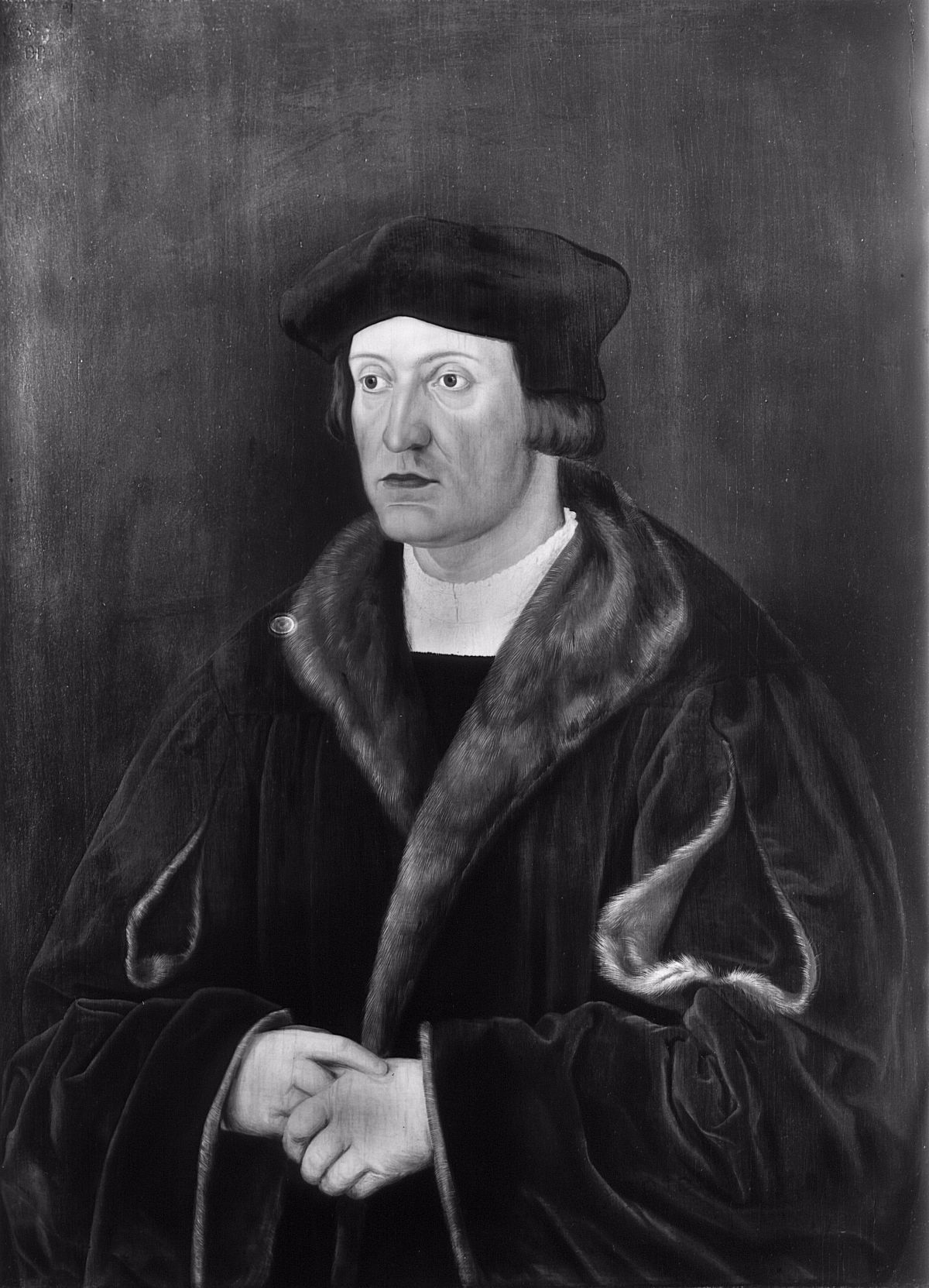
- Ernest of Bavaria (1500–1560)
- Born: 13 June 1500; Munich
- Died: 7 December 1560 (aged 60); Glatz
- Burial: Munich Frauenkirche
- House: House of Wittelsbach
- Father: Albert IV of Bavaria-Munich
- Mother: Kunigunde of Austria

Duke Ernest of Bavaria (13 June 1500 – 7 December 1560) was the Administrator of the dioceses of Passau and Salzburg and pledge lord of Glatz.

== Background and education ==
Ernest was a member of the Bavarian noble Wittelsbach family. He was the third son of Duke Albert IV of Bavaria-Munich and his wife Kunigunde, daughter of Holy Roman Emperor Frederick III.

In 1506 Albert issued a Primogeniture Act, stipulating that Bavaria should remain undivided. The result was that his two younger sons Louis and Ernest were excluded from the government. Louis's parents decided that he should follow an ecclesiastical career instead. After Albert died in 1508, the Bavarian court historian Johannes Aventinus was entrusted with providing Ernest with a suitable education. Ernest and Louis travelled to Italy, here he worked in Pavia and attended lectures from the famous legal scholar Jason Magnus. Ernest also travelled to Paris and to Saxony with John of Malentein, who later became Bishop of Seckau.

In 1515 Louis enrolled at the University of Ingolstadt. He soon became a member of Sodalitas Ingolstatiensis, a literary society founded by Aventinus, after a suggestion by the Humanist Conrad Celtis.

=== Administrator of Passau ===
With the support of Emperor Maximilian I the brothers William and Louis, succeeded in 1514 to have Ernest appointed Coadjutor of Bishop Wiguleus Fröschl of Marzoll in Passau. The papal confirmation the appointment on 28 January 1517.

Although Ernest had not been ordained, he was appointed Administrator of the Diocese of Passau after the death of Bishop Fröschl in 1517. Nevertheless, he did not give up his claim to the co-regency in the Duchy of Bavaria-Munich. His hereditary claims were supported by Archduke Ferdinand I. The issue was finally settled in 1534 by the Treaty of Linz between the royal houses of Habsburg and Wittelsbach. In 1536, Ernest gave up his claims, in exchange for a severance payment of 275000 florins.

As administrator of Passau, Ernest opposed the followers of Martin Luther and against the Anabaptists. In 1522, he participated in the Provincial Synod in Mühldorf am Inn and in 1527 he took part in the conference in Salzburg. In 1524 he joined an alliance between the South German bishops, the dukes of Bavaria and the Archduke Ferdinand to enforce the Edict of Worms. On his instigation, the Reformer Leonhard Kaiser was handed over to the secular authorities in 1527 and burned at the stake in Schärding, then part of the district of Burghausen. In 1532, Ernest was present at the imperial Diet in Augsburg and in 1532 in Regensburg.

As an entrepreneur, Ernest participated in Bohemian mines and traded in precious metals. He carried out transactions to Vienna, Prague, Leipzig and Antwerp, and maintained close relations with the South German trading cities.

=== Administrator of Salzburg ===
In accordance with the agreement from 1516, the brothers William and Louis sought to ensure that Ernest would be the next person to rule the Archdiocese of Salzburg. In 1525, the made an agreement with the Salzburg cathedral chapter whereby Ernest was appointed coadjutor of the archbishop of Salzburg as compensation for the Bavarian help in the German Peasants' War. The chapter duly proposed his appointment to the Pope, who rejected the proposal. To enable a new appointment procedure, Ernest resigned from his position as administrator of the diocese of Passau.

After the death of Bishop Matthäus Lang von Wellenburg of Salzburg, Ernest was elected as administrator of Salzburg by the chapter on 21 April 1540. The Pope confirmed his election on 21 May of that year, subject to the condition that within ten years, Ernest should be ordained as a priest or otherwise he would have to abandon the archdiocese. He took possession of the diocese on 12 October 1540.

In Salzburg, like before in Passau, Ernest was lenient towards the Protestant movement. Perhaps an understanding of the intellectual and social causes of the Reformation may have played a role. He contributed little to the intellectual and spiritual revival of Catholicism; he recognized, however, the social and economic developments of his time. He attended the Diet of Regensburg in 1541 and held provincial synods in 1544 and 1553. He was a capable administrator: he brought order to the country's finances and introduced administrative reforms. Like in Passau he loved economic enterprises. He was involved in Alpine mining, cattle and grain trade, and at dealing in coins.

Even as Archbishop-designate Ernest delayed his ordination. In his will, dated 25 September 1550, he explained that he had never intended to become a priest. He repeatedly asked the Pope for dispensation of the higher orders, but this was finally denied in 1554. The Pope presented him with the choice of being ordained immediately or resignation. Ernest opted to resign and on 16 July 1554 he left to his successor, Michael of Kuenburg.

=== Pledge Lord of Glatz ===
When the end of his ecclesiastical career loomed, Ernest purchased the County of Glatz from Jan IV of Pernštejn in 1549. In 1549, Glatz was considered part of Bohemia. Included in the purchase was the Lordship of Hummel, which Ernest gave to his son Eustace on 10 December 1549. Eustace was his illegitimate son, until he was legitimized as a noble descendant of Ernest by Pope Julius III in 1550. In 1546, Ernest was accepted by the Estates of Bohemia as a landed subject.

Ernest settled permanently in Glatz in 1556. He did not resume hist former economic and business activities. Although he no longer held an ecclesiastical office, he committed himself to the Counter Reformation and in 1558, he and Emperor Ferdinand I, called a synod. The primary aim of this synod was to test the beliefs of the clergy. A questionnaire had been developed by the Cistercian abbots John of Grüssau and Leonhard of Fürstenfeld.

Ernest also reformed the administration of Glatz, employing qualified officials, whom he had brought with him from Salzburg and Bavaria. He expanded the castle of Glatz. His purchase of Glatz included the privilege to mint coins, so he started minting coins showing the Bohemian lion on one side and the coats of arms of Palatinate-Zweibrücken, the Duchy of Bavaria and the County of Glatz on the other side.

To round off his possessions, Ernest purchased in 1556 the East Bohemian Lordships of Rychnov nad Kněžnou, Litice Castle, Potštejn, Solnice and Černíkovice.

Ernest died in 1560 and was buried in Glatz. A short time later, however, his body was transferred to Munich and buried in the Wittelsbach crypt in the Church of Our Lady. The pledge lordship of Glatz was inherited by his nephew Albert V, who sold it to Maximilian II in 1567.

== Ancestors ==
Ancestors of Ernest of Bavaria (1500–1560)

16. John II, Duke of Bavaria
8. Ernest, Duke of Bavaria
17. Catherine of Gorizia
4. Albert III, Duke of Bavaria
18. Bernabò Visconti
9. Elisabetta Visconti
19. Beatrice Regina della Scala
2. Albert IV, Duke of Bavaria
20. Albert I, Duke of Brunswick-Grubenhagen
10. Eric I, Duke of Brunswick-Grubenhagen
21. Agnes of Brunswick-Lüneburg
5. Anna of Brunswick-Grubenhagen-Einbeck
22. Otto I, Duke of Brunswick-Göttingen
11. Elisabeth of Brunswick-Göttingen
23. Margaret of Jülich
1. Ernest of Bavaria
24. Leopold III, Duke of Austria
12. Ernest, Duke of Austria
25. Viridis Visconti
6. Frederick III, Holy Roman Emperor
26. Siemowit IV, Duke of Masovia
13. Cymburgis of Masovia
27. Alexandra of Lithuania
3. Kunigunde of Austria
28. John I of Portugal
14. Edward of Portugal
29. Philippa of Lancaster
7. Eleanor of Portugal, Holy Roman Empress
30. Ferdinand I of Aragon
15. Eleanor of Aragon, Queen of Portugal
31. Eleanor of Alburquerque

== Sources ==
- August Leidl, Franz Ortner, in: Erwin Gatz: Die Bischöfe des Heiligen Römischen Reiches 1448-1648, ISBN 3-428-08422-5, p. 160–163
- Heinrich von Zeißberg (1877). "Ernst, Herzog von Baiern" . Allgemeine Deutsche Biographie (in German). Vol. 6. Leipzig: Duncker & Humblot. pp. 249–250.
- Dieter Albrecht (1959). "Ernst, Herzog von Bayern". Neue Deutsche Biographie (in German). Vol. 4. Berlin: Duncker & Humblot. pp. 619–619.
- Ronny Baier (2003). "Bayern, Ernst Herzog von". In Bautz, Traugott (ed.). Biographisch-Bibliographisches Kirchenlexikon (BBKL) (in German). Vol. 21. Nordhausen: Bautz. cols. 85–87. ISBN 3-88309-110-3.
- Hans und Marga Rall: Die Wittelsbacher in Lebensbildern. Munich, 2005, ISBN 978-3-492-24597-5, p. 114
- Arno Herzig, Małgorzata Ruchniewicz: Geschichte des Glatzer Landes, Hamburg/Wrocław, 2006, ISBN 3-934632-12-2, p. 66–70

Ernest of Bavaria (1500–1560) House of Wittelsbach Born: 13 June 1500 Died: 7 December 1560
Preceded by Wiguleus Fröschl of Marzoll	Administrator of Passau; 1516–1540	Succeeded by Wolfgang of Salm
Preceded by Matthäus Lang von Wellenburg	Administrator of Salzburg; 1540–1554	Succeeded by Michael of Kuenburg
