= Archduchess Maria Anna of Austria (born 1610) =

Electress of Bavaria from 1635 to 1651

Maria Anna of Austria
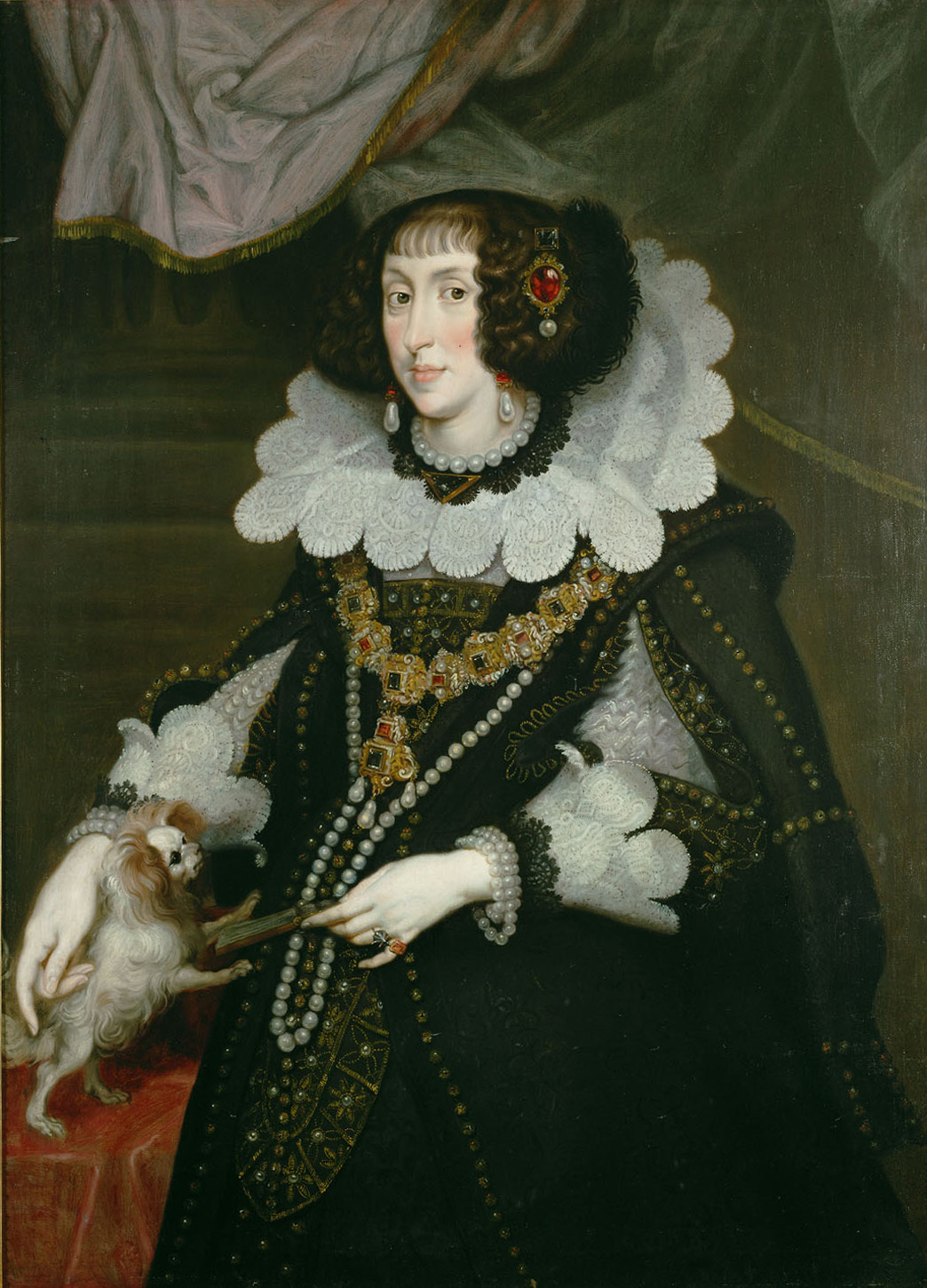
- Oil on canvas by Joachim von Sandrart, 1643, Kunsthistorisches Museum, Vienna

Electress consort of Bavaria
- Tenure: 15 July 1635 – 27 September 1651

Electress Palatine
- Tenure: 15 July 1635 – 24 October 1648

Regent of Bavaria
- Tenure: 27 September 1651 – 1654
- Born: 13 January 1610; Graz, Duchy of Styria, Holy Roman Empire
- Died: 25 September 1665 (aged 55); Munich, Electorate of Bavaria, Holy Roman Empire
- Spouse: Maximilian I, Elector of Bavaria (m. 1635; died 1651)
- Issue: Ferdinand Maria, Elector of Bavaria; Duke Maximilian Philipp Hieronymus
- House: Habsburg
- Father: Ferdinand II, Holy Roman Emperor
- Mother: Maria Anna of Bavaria

Archduchess Maria Anna of Austria (German: Maria Anna von Habsburg, Erzherzogin von Österreich, also known as Maria Anna von Bayern or Maria-Anna, Kurfürstin von Bayern; 13 January 1610 – 25 September 1665), was a German regent, Electress of Bavaria by marriage to Maximilian I, Elector of Bavaria, and co-regent of the Electorate of Bavaria during the minority of her son Ferdinand Maria, Elector of Bavaria from 1651 to 1654.

== Life ==
=== Archduchess of Austria ===
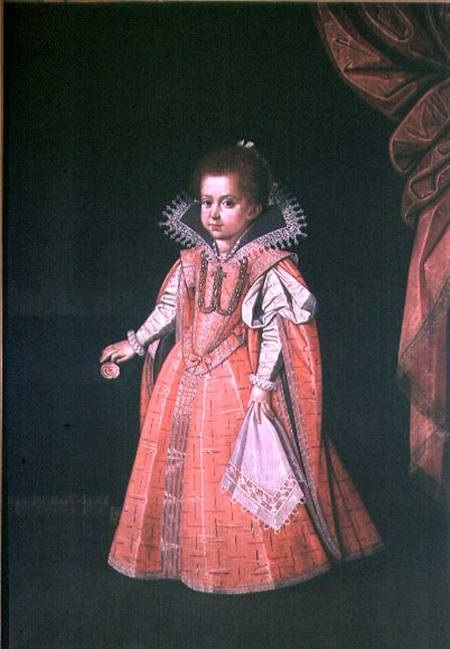
Maria Anna as a child

Born in Graz, she was the fifth child and second, but oldest surviving, daughter of Archduke Ferdinand of Inner Austria by his first wife Maria Anna, a daughter of William V, Duke of Bavaria. She was probably named after her mother, who died in 1616.

Maria Anna, who had a particular fondness for hunting, received a strict Jesuit upbringing and was considered a great beauty with exceptional virtues, such as prudence, orderly life and stateliness. She also spoke fluent Italian in addition to her native German.

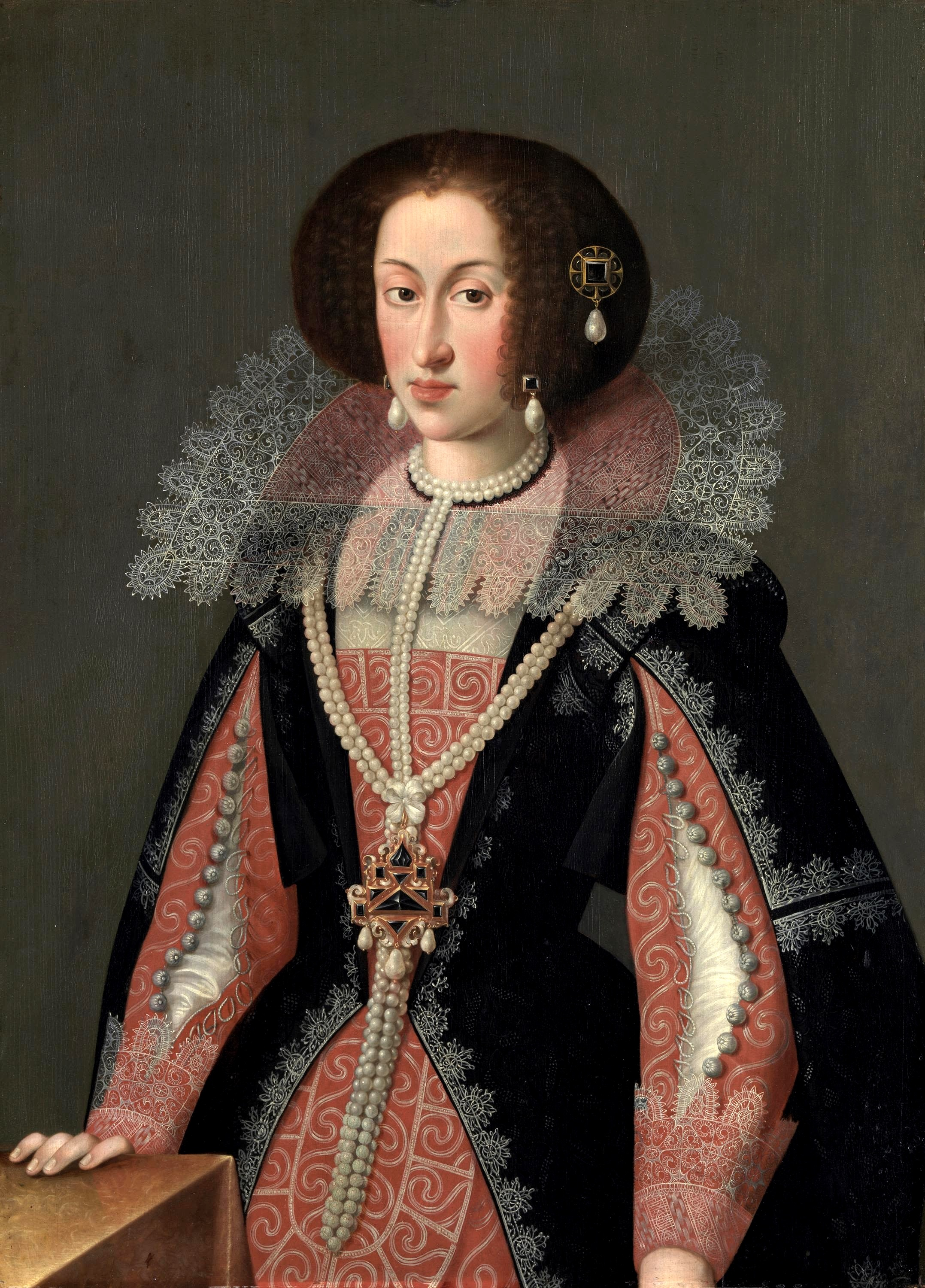
Portrait by anonymous, c. 1635–1645

In 1619 her father became Holy Roman Emperor and King of Bohemia and Hungary, an event that considerably raised her status. Two years later, in 1622, the now Emperor Ferdinand II married again, with Eleonora, daughter of Vincenzo I Gonzaga, Duke of Mantua, with whom he had no children.

=== Marriage ===
On 15 July 1635 at the Augustinian Church, Vienna, Maria Anna married her uncle, Maximilian I, Elector of Bavaria, whose previous wife, Elisabeth of Lorraine, had died a few months earlier. The wedding was celebrated by Franz von Dietrichstein, Bishop of Olomouc.

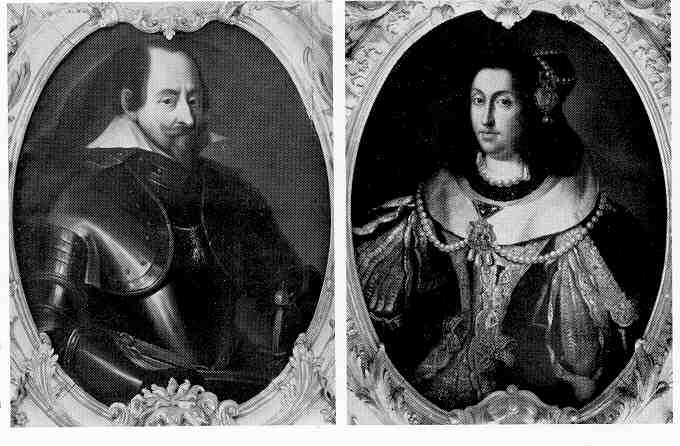
Portraits of Maria Anna and her husband, Maximilian I.

In the marriage contract, which was signed two days later on 17 July, the Emperor made the exceptional stipulation that Maria Anna would not renounce her rights over the Habsburg inheritance (Erbverzicht) as was customary for Austrian Archduchesses when they married foreign princes; this was made probably by Ferdinand II with the intention to secure the rights of his eldest daughter in the case of the extinction of his male descendants. As a dowry, Maria Anna received the amount of 250,000 florins secured from Wasserburg Castle and the districts of Kraiburg and Neumarkt. As a widow's seat she received Trausnitz Castle in Landshut.

With this union, the Bavarian elector not only gained the opportunity to sire the long-waited heir (his first marriage was childless) but also to demonstrate his alliance with the Holy Roman Empire against France, which was prepared for an imminent war. However, this connection only played a minor role in the relations between Austria and Bavaria later.

=== Electress of Bavaria ===
The marriage was very happy and Maximilian I cared for his wife lovingly. During Maria Anna's first pregnancy, the electoral couple made a pilgrimage to Andechs to pray for a happy birth. On 31 October 1636, the Electress gave birth to her first son, who was named Ferdinand Maria after his grandfather Ferdinand II, who also acted as godfather for the child. The childbirth proved to be extremely difficult for Maria Anna; she became so weak that she lost her ability to speak. Her healing was attributed to the help of the relics of Saint Francis of Paola, so Maximilian I founded in Neunburg vorm Wald a monastery consecrated to him. Almost two years later, on 30 September 1638, the Electress gave birth a second son, Maximilian Philipp Hieronymus.

Maria Anna assisted her husband in government affairs and showed interest in the politics of the Bavarian electorate; she even took part in the meetings of the Council of Ministers. Despite her Habsburg origins (she had an extensive correspondence with her brother Ferdinand III and other relatives), she was completely dedicated to the Bavarian viewpoint. In addition, she conducted lively exchanges of opinion with high officials of Munich.

After the conquest of Philipsburg fortress by the French in 1644, Maria Anna urged her brother Leopold Wilhelm, on behalf of her husband, to enter into peace negotiations. (Archduke Leopold Wilhelm had been commander of the Imperial army since 1639.) Shortly before his death in 1650, Maximilian I had a Treuherzige Information (Trust information) written for his wife to give her guidance for her upcoming regency.

=== Regent of the Electorate of Bavaria ===
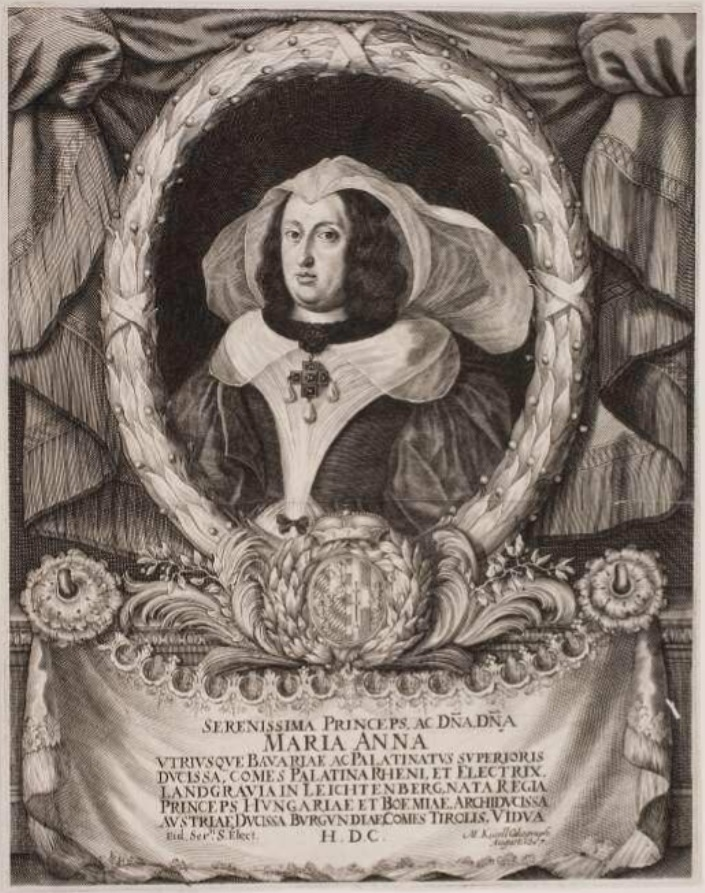
Maria Anna as a widow

When Maximilian I wrote his will in 1641, Maria Anna claimed in this for the eventual reign of her son, a co-signature law in national matters. However, the Office of the Administrator in Bavaria and Saxony claimed that according to the Golden Bull women were excluded from government. She consulted an expert commission without her husband's knowledge and secured a favorable ruling concerning her rights added in Maximilian I's will. Thus, after Maximilian I's death (27 September 1651) his brother Albert VI, Duke of Bavaria legally became the regent for Ferdinand Maria and was confirmed in that position in both Imperial and electoral courts. Maria Anna assumed full responsibility for the Department of Justice and other country administrative tasks, however, which virtually left the Dowager Electress ruler of Bavaria. In addition to Albert VI and the Dowager Electress, the Hofkammerpräsident Mändl belonged to the administration that continued to work with the young elector when he attained his majority in 1654.

In 1664 Maria Anna, who remained a close advisor to her son even after the end of her regency, suggested putting the country under the patronage of Saint Joseph. After the death of her husband, she lived in the so-called Widow's floor (Witwenstock) in the southwestern part of the Munich Residenz. Until her death she was a member of the Privy Council, the highest governmental body, although she hadn't the right of voting.

She died in Munich aged 55 and was buried at St. Michael's Church, while her heart was deposited in the Shrine of Our Lady of Altötting.

== In literature ==
Maria Anna is a central character in the novel, 1634: The Bavarian Crisis (Eric Flint & Virginia DeMarce. Baen Books.) She escaped marriage to Maximilian and escaped to her cousin, Don Fernando, who had declared himself "King in the Low Countries".

== Ancestry ==
Ancestors of Archduchess Maria Anna of Austria (born 1610)

8. Ferdinand I, Holy Roman Emperor
4. Charles II, Archduke of Austria
9. Anna of Bohemia and Hungary
2. Ferdinand II, Holy Roman Emperor
10. Albert V, Duke of Bavaria (= 12)
5. Maria Anna of Bavaria (≠ 3)
11. Anna of Austria (= 13)
1. Archduchess Maria Anna of Austria
12. Albert V, Duke of Bavaria (= 10)
6. William V, Duke of Bavaria
13. Anna of Austria (= 11)
3. Maria Anna of Bavaria (≠ 5)
14. Francis I, Duke of Lorraine
7. Renata of Lorraine
15. Christina of Denmark

== References and notes ==
Archduchess Maria Anna of Austria (born 1610) House of Habsburg Born: 13 January 1610 Died: 25 September 1665
Royal titles
Vacant Title last held by Elisabeth of Lorraine	Electress consort of Bavaria; 1635–1651	Vacant Title next held by Henriette Adelaide of Savoy
Vacant Title last held by Elisabeth of Lorraine	Electress Palatine; 1635–1648	Vacant Title next held by Charlotte of Hesse-Kassel
