= Ferdinand Maria, Elector of Bavaria =

Elector of Bavaria from 1651 to 1679

Ferdinand Maria
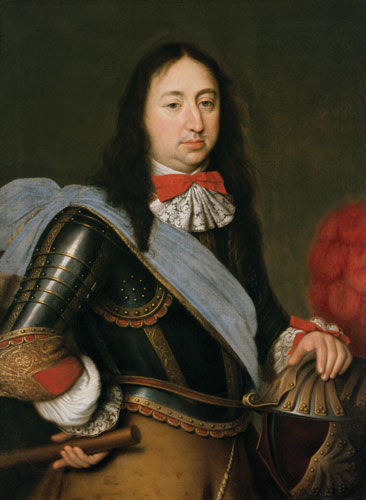
- Portrait by Paul Mignard, 1674

Elector of Bavaria
- Reign: 27 September 1651 – 26 May 1679
- Predecessor: Maximilian I
- Successor: Maximilian II Emanuel
- Born: 31 October 1636; Schleissheim Palace, Electorate of Bavaria, Holy Roman Empire
- Died: 26 May 1679 (aged 42); Schleissheim Palace, Electorate of Bavaria, Holy Roman Empire
- Burial: June 1679; Theatiner Church, Bavaria
- Spouse: Princess Henriette Adelaide of Savoy (m. 1650; died 1676)
- Issue: Maria Anna Victoria, Dauphine of France; Maximilian II Emanuel, Elector of Bavaria; Joseph Clemens, Archbishop of Cologne; Violante Beatrice, Grand Princess of Tuscany
- House: Wittelsbach
- Father: Maximilian I, Elector of Bavaria
- Mother: Maria Anna of Austria
- Religion: Roman Catholicism

Ferdinand Maria (31 October 1636 – 26 May 1679) was a Wittelsbach ruler of Bavaria and a prince-elector of the Holy Roman Empire from 1651 to 1679. The Elector modernized the army and introduced Bavaria's first government code. Besides encouraging agriculture and industry, he also improved building and restoration works on churches and monasteries since the damage caused during the Thirty Years' War.

== Electoral Prince of Bavaria ==
He was born in Munich. He was the eldest son of Maximilian I, Elector of Bavaria (whom he succeeded), and his second wife, Maria Anna of Austria, daughter of Ferdinand II, Holy Roman Emperor.

Born during the reign of his father, he was known as the Electoral Prince from birth. Through his mother, he was a first cousin of Queen Mariana of Spain as well as Leopold I, Holy Roman Emperor.

On 8 December 1650, he married Princess Henriette Adelaide of Savoy, daughter of Victor Amadeus I, Duke of Savoy and Christine Marie of France. The couple had seven children, only two of whom would have offspring.

== Elector ==
Still a minor when he succeeded his father in 1651, his mother became his guardian and his uncle, Albert VI of Bavaria served as Prince Regent of Bavaria for three years.

Ferdinand Maria was crowned on 31 October 1654. His absolutistic style of leadership became a benchmark for the rest of Germany. Though Ferdinand Maria was allied with France, he made no attempt to oppose the Habsburg candidate at the 1658 imperial election after the death of his uncle Ferdinand III, Holy Roman Emperor to avoid conflict. Ferdinand Maria supported the Habsburgs in the Austro-Turkish War (1663–1664) against the Ottoman Empire, providing Bavarian contingents for the Army of the Holy Roman Empire. Under his leadership, Bavaria was officially neutral during the Franco-Dutch War (1672–1678). Plans for a Bavarian colony near New York were discussed but soon abandoned.

The marriage of his eldest daughter Maria Anna Victoria and her cousin le Grand Dauphin in 1680 was the outcome of the Bavarian alliance with France. Ferdinand Maria was the great grandfather of the future French monarch Louis XV.

Ferdinand Maria modernized the Bavarian Army and introduced the first Bavarian local government code. The Elector did much indeed to repair the wounds caused by the Thirty Years' War, encouraging agriculture and industries, and building or restoring numerous churches and monasteries. In 1669, moreover, he again called a meeting of the diet, which had been suspended since 1612. At the end of his reign he left the electorate with a very wealthy treasury.

He died at the Old Schleissheim Palace and was succeeded by his son Maximilian II Emanuel. He was buried in the crypt of the Theatine Church, Munich.

== Cultural legacy ==
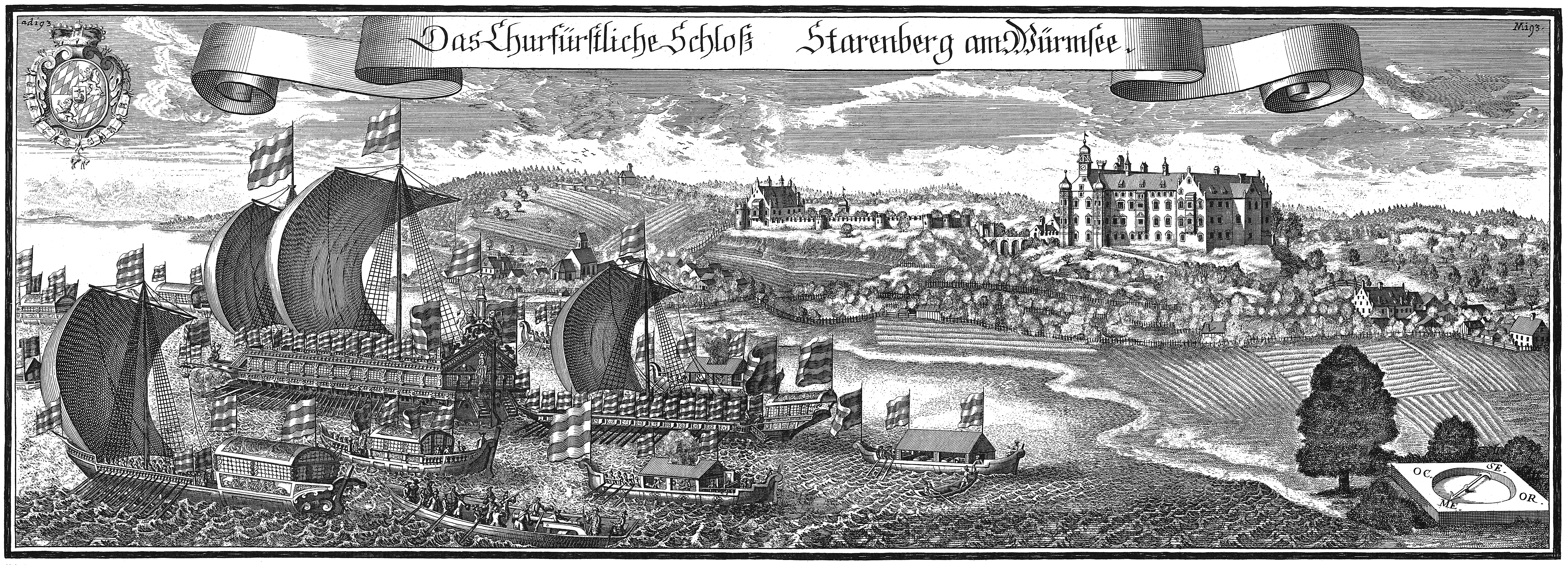
Copperplate engraving by Michael Wening. Starnberg Castle with Ferdinand Maria's gondola Bucentaurus in Topographia Bavariae about 1700

Ferdinand Maria married Princess Henriette Adelaide of Savoy in 1650; and with her, the Italian Baroque was introduced in Bavaria.

The Theatine Church, Munich was built from 1663 onwards as a gesture of thanks for the birth of the long-awaited heir to the Bavarian crown, Prince Maximilian II Emanuel. After that in 1664, Ferdinand Maria and his wife commissioned the building of the Baroque style Nymphenburg Palace near Munich based on the designs of Italian architect Agostino Barelli.

Lake Starnberg was purchased by Ferdinand Maria from the Horwarth family and it became the venue of numerous festivities of the court with the famous fleet of Venetian Gondolas. On the lake's shores, he ordered the construction of Berg Castle in 1676.

The castle was used for festivities there and later reached its zenith when it became the scene of spectacular entertainments and hunts under the rule of his successors, Maximilian Emanuel and Emperor Charles VII. For the Munich Residenz, Ferdinand Maria ordered the creation of the Papal Rooms.

== Issue ==
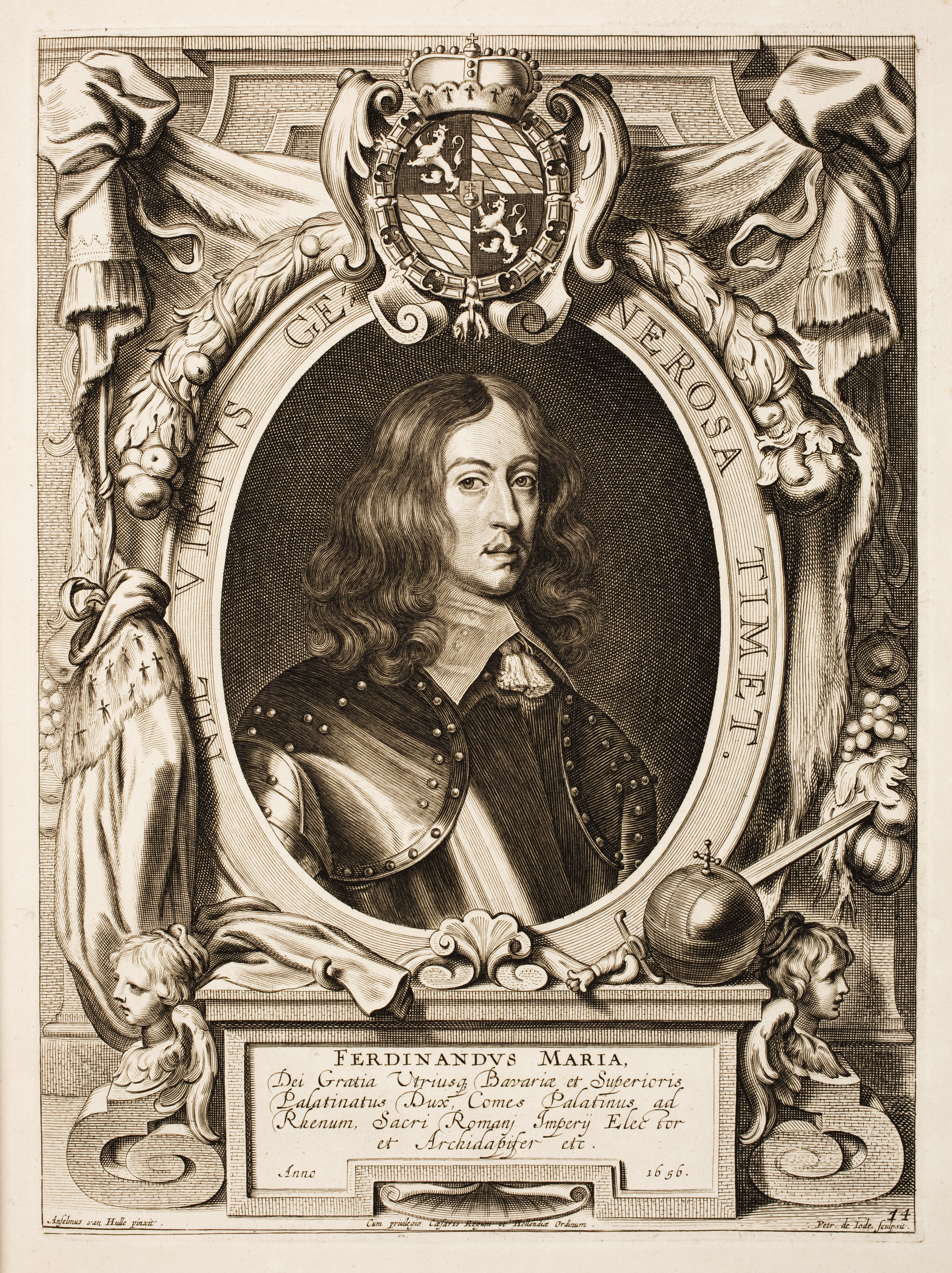
Engraving of Ferdinand Maria, Elector of Bavaria

- Maria Anna Victoria of Bavaria (28 November 1660 – 20 April 1690) married Louis, Dauphin of France, and had issue.
- Maximilian II Emanuel, Elector of Bavaria (11 July 1662 – 26 February 1726); married Maria Antonia of Austria and had issue; married Theresa Kunegunda Sobieska and had issue.
- Luise Margarete Antonie of Bavaria (18 September 1663 – 10 November 1665) died in infancy.
- Ludwig Amadeus Victor of Bavaria (6 April 1665 – 11 December 1665) died in infancy.
- Stillborn son (4 August 1666).
- Kajetan Maria Franz of Bavaria (2 May 1670 – 7 December 1670) died in infancy.
- Joseph Clemens of Bavaria (5 December 1671 – 12 November 1723) Elector and Archbishop of Cologne died unmarried.
- Violante Beatrix of Bavaria (3 April 1673 – 3 June 1731) married Ferdinando de' Medici, Grand Prince of Tuscany and died childless.

In addition, the Electress suffered three miscarriages: in June 1661, March 1664 and 1674.

== Ancestors ==
Ancestors of Ferdinand Maria, Elector of Bavaria

8. Albert V, Duke of Bavaria
4. William V, Duke of Bavaria
9. Archduchess Anna of Austria
2. Maximilian I, Elector of Bavaria
10. Francis I, Duke of Lorraine
5. Princess Renata of Lorraine
11. Princess Christina of Denmark
1. Ferdinand Maria of Bavaria
12. Charles II, Archduke of Austria
6. Ferdinand II, Holy Roman Emperor
13. Maria Anna of Bavaria (1551–1608)
3. Archduchess Maria Anna of Austria
14. William V, Duke of Bavaria =4
7. Maria Anna of Bavaria (1574–1616)
15. Princess Renata of Lorraine =5

Ferdinand Maria, Elector of Bavaria House of Wittelsbach Born: 31 October 1636 Died: 26 May 1679
Regnal titles
Preceded by Maximilian I	Elector of Bavaria; 1651–1679	Succeeded by Maximilian II Emanuel
