= Archduke Leopold Wilhelm of Austria =

Austrian archduke and military commander

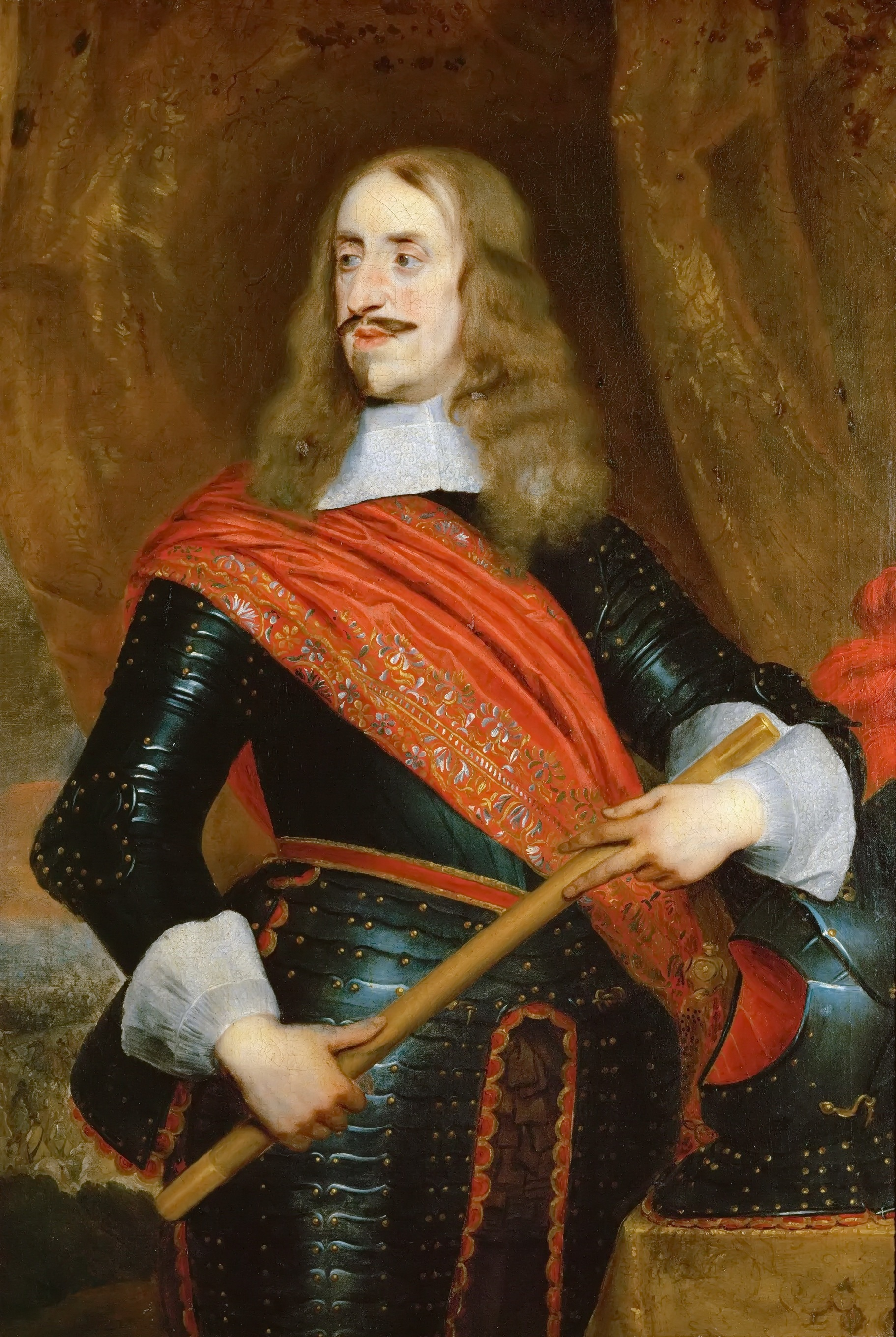
- Archduke Leopold Wilhelm of Austria, by Pieter Thijs
- Born: 5 January 1614; Wiener Neustadt
- Died: 20 November 1662 (aged 48); Vienna
- Relatives: Emperor Ferdinand III (brother); Leopold I (nephew)
- Military career
- Allegiance: Holy Roman Empire
- Branch: Army of the Holy Roman Empire
- Service years: 1640–1656
- Rank: Generalfeldmarschall
- Conflicts: Thirty Years' War: Battle of Breitenfeld (1642); Battle of Jankau; Franco-Spanish War (1635–1659): Siege of Gravelines (1644); Battle of Lens
- Other work: Prince-bishop; Halberstadt Passau Breslau Olmütz Strasbourg; Grand Master, Teutonic Order 1641–1662

Governor-General of the Spanish Netherlands
- In office 10 April 1647 – 11 May 1656
- Monarch: Philip IV
- Valido: Luis de Haro
- Preceded by: Manuel de Moura Corte Real, 2nd Marquis of Castelo Rodrigo
- Succeeded by: John Joseph of Austria

Archduke Leopold Wilhelm of Austria (5 January 1614 – 20 November 1662), younger brother of Emperor Ferdinand III, was an Austrian soldier, administrator and patron of the arts.

He held a number of military commands, with limited success, and served as Governor of the Spanish Netherlands, before returning to Vienna in 1656. Despite being nominated as Holy Roman Emperor after Ferdinand's death in 1657, he stood aside in favour of his nephew Leopold I.

His main interest was in art, and he patronised artists including David Teniers the Younger, Frans Snyders, Peter Snayers, Daniel Seghers, Peter Franchoys, Frans Wouters, Jan van den Hoecke and Pieter Thijs. His collection of 17th century Venetian and Dutch paintings are now held by the Kunsthistorisches Museum in Vienna.

== Life ==
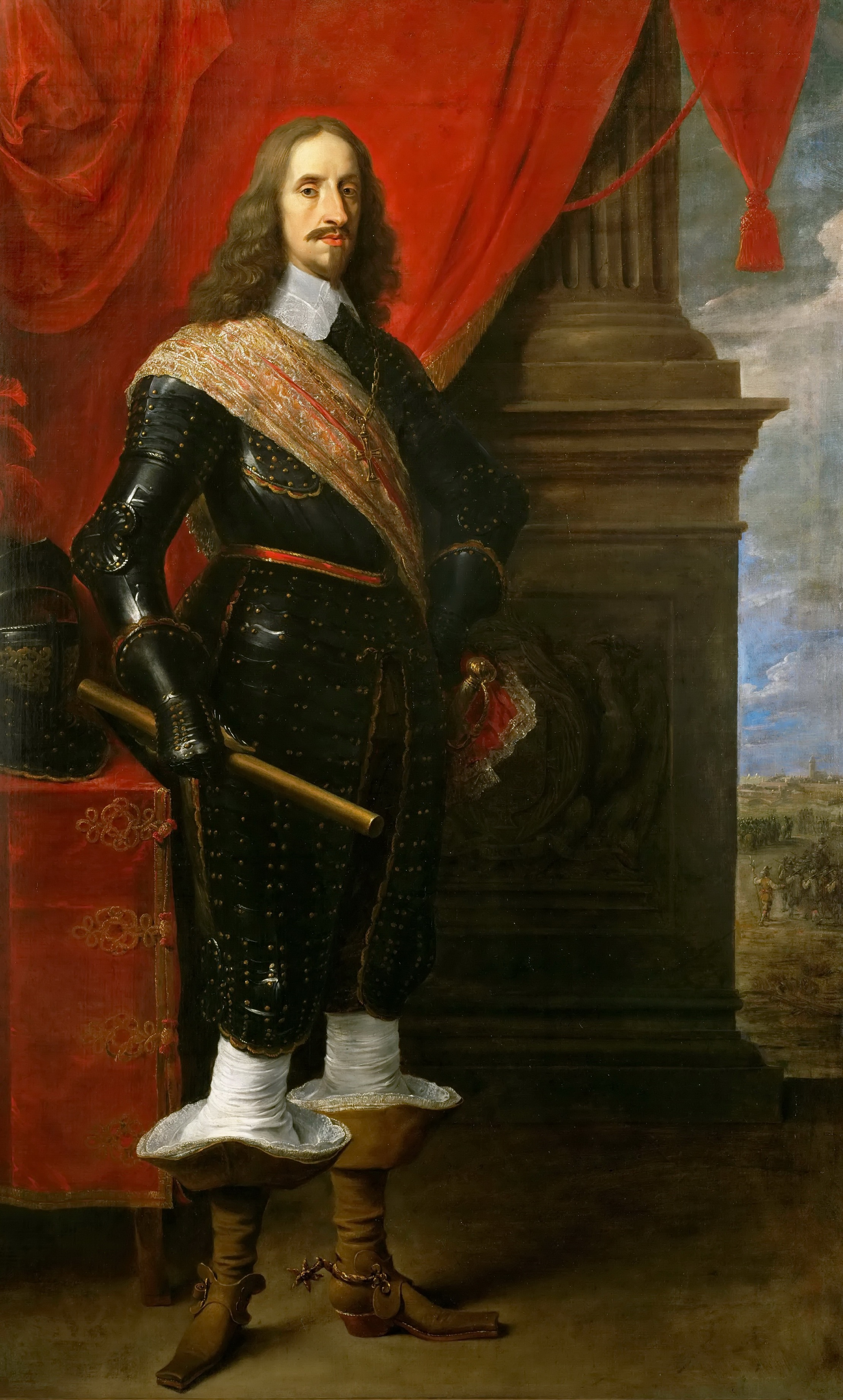
Archduke Leopold Wilhelm of Austria, ca 1650s by David Teniers the Younger

Born at Wiener Neustadt on 5 January 1614, he was the final of seven children born to Emperor Ferdinand II (1578-1637) and his first wife, Maria Anna of Bavaria (1574–1616). His elder brother became Emperor Ferdinand III (1608–1657).

== Career ==
As a younger son, Leopold was educated for the church. However, he was never ordained. In spite of the reforms of the Council of Trent that were meant to weaken the basis for Protestant claims of impropriety, Leopold accumulated a variety of ecclesiastical titles. In 1626, at the age of 12, he became bishop of Strasbourg and Passau, succeeding his uncle Archduke Leopold V.

While this title can be understood as a traditional sinecure for a noble who was the youngest of his siblings, he also held the title of bishop of Halberstadt beginning in 1627 and archbishop of Magdeburg beginning in 1629. These latter two titles can be best understood as related to the ambitions of his father, Emperor Ferdinand II, to re-Catholicize these Protestant areas where Catholic infrastructure had largely disappeared. This attempt was unsuccessful, as Magdeburg was secularized in 1635 and given to the duke of Saxony, while Halberstadt passed to Brandenburg and out of Catholic hands in 1648.

In the case of Magdeburg, the title had come with no power at all. This was similar to the bishopric of Olmütz, which was located in the Margraviate of Moravia and therefore belonged to the Habsburg Monarchy. Nonetheless, Leopold received the title of bishop of Olmütz, along with a rich stipend, in 1637 and bishop of Breslau in 1555, again primarily for the monetary advantages the title afforded. He became the Grand Master of the Teutonic Order in 1641.

During his lifetime, the Habsburg rulers of Spain and the Holy Roman Empire faced the 1568 to 1648 Dutch Revolt, the 1618 to 1648 Thirty Years War and other conflicts, including the Franco-Spanish War (1635–1659). Despite his reluctance, Ferdinand made him Imperial commander in 1639, largely due to lack of reliable subordinates; he resigned following a disastrous defeat at Second Breitenfeld in 1642, a battle fought against the advice of his generals.

He was re-appointed after another Imperial defeat at the 1645 Battle of Jankau, then Governor of the Spanish Netherlands in 1647. In that role, he lost the Battle of Lens against Condé and then he helped negotiate an end to the war in the 1648 Treaty of Westphalia; the Franco-Spanish War continued, obliging him to remain in Brussels until 1656.

== Art collection ==
While in Brussels, he employed David Teniers the Younger as keeper of his collection, spending immense sums on works by Frans Snyders, Peter Snayers, Daniel Seghers, Peter Franchoys, Frans Wouters, Jan van den Hoecke, Pieter Thijs, Jan van de Venne and others. He also acquired a number of Italian masters, purchased from the sale of collections owned by Bartolomeo della Nave and Charles I. His most prized pieces engraved in the book Theatrum Pictorium, which is often called the first "art catalogue".

When the tomb of Childeric I, an early Merovingian king, was discovered in 1653 by a mason doing repairs in the church of Saint-Brice in Tournai, it was Leopold Wilhelm who had the find published in Latin. On his return to Vienna in 1656, his collection relocated to the Hofburg Palace, where Jan Anton van der Baren, a Flemish priest and artist, served as director. The collection was bequeathed to his nephew Leopold I, and is now part of the collections of the Kunsthistorisches Museum in Vienna.

He played an active role in court politics and was close to his stepmother, Eleonora of Mantua (1598-1655), who shared his interest in Italian art and was a prominent supporter of the Catholic Counter-Reformation. Although suggested as a candidate to replace Ferdinand as Holy Roman Emperor in 1657, he ensured his nephew Leopold I was elected when he reached 18 in July 1658.

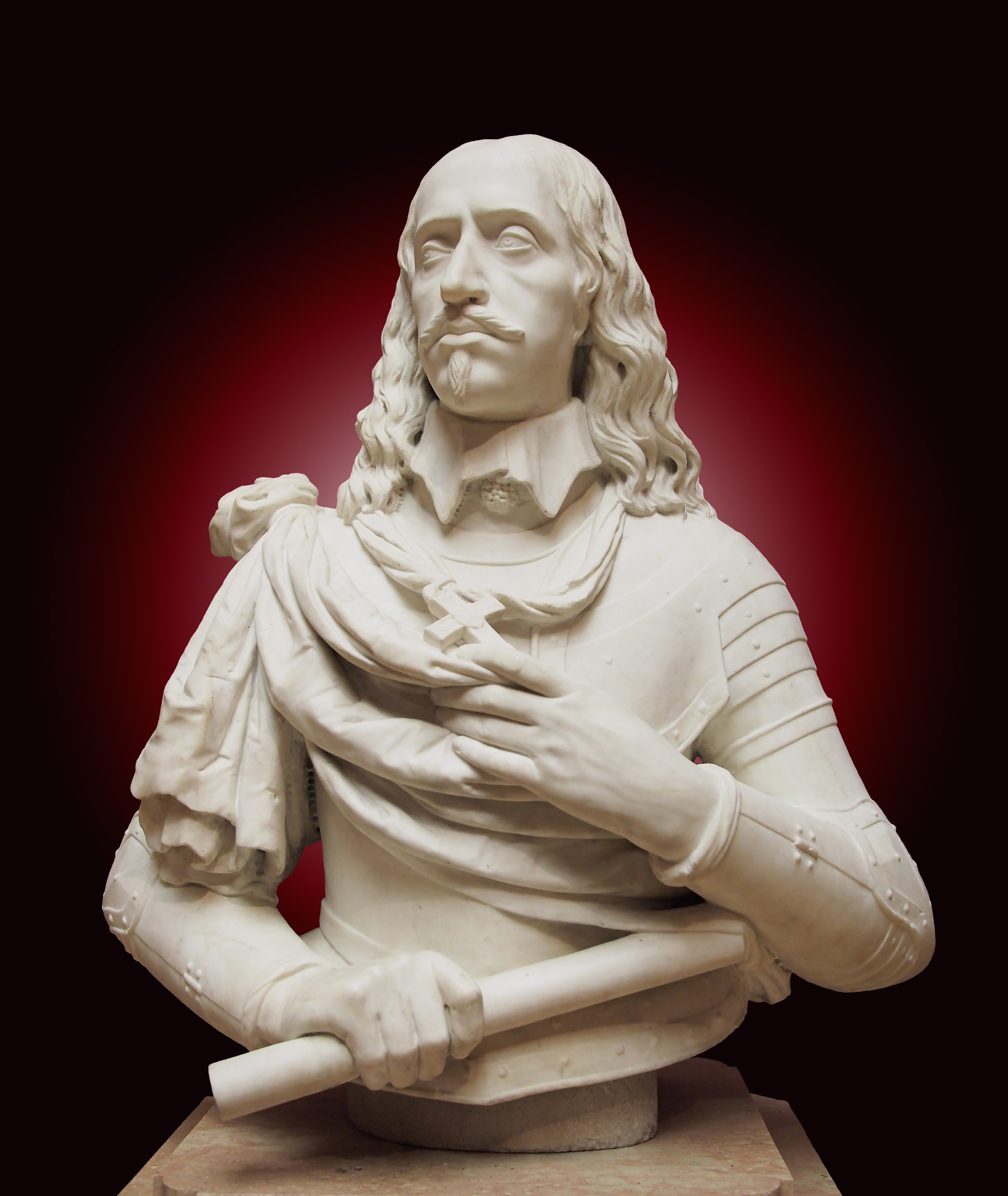
Bust of Archduke Leopold Wilhelm of Austria, by Francois Dieussart (1656). Kunsthistorisches Museum

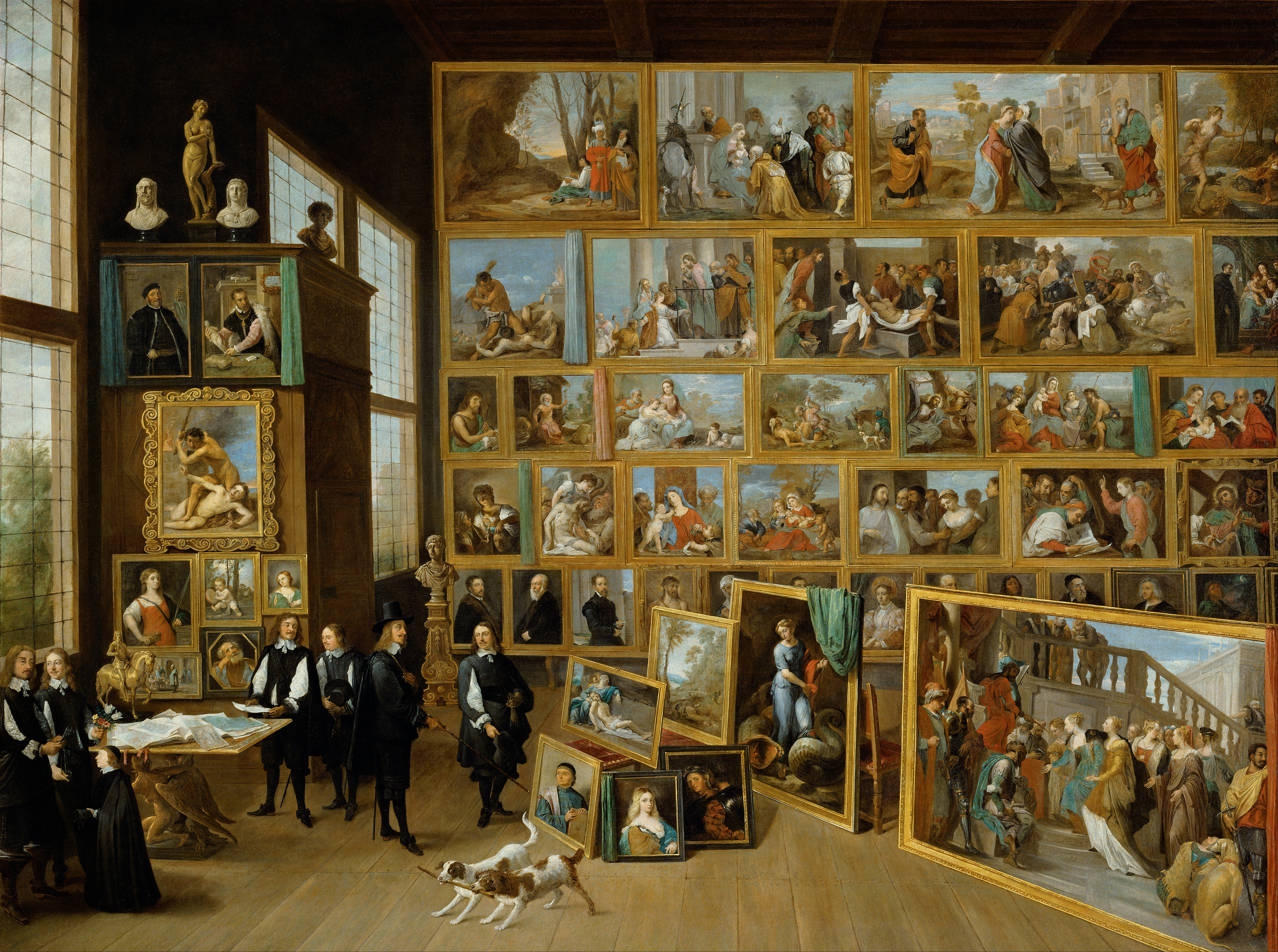
Archduke Leopold Wilhelm in his Gallery in Brussels, by David Teniers the Younger, c. 1650

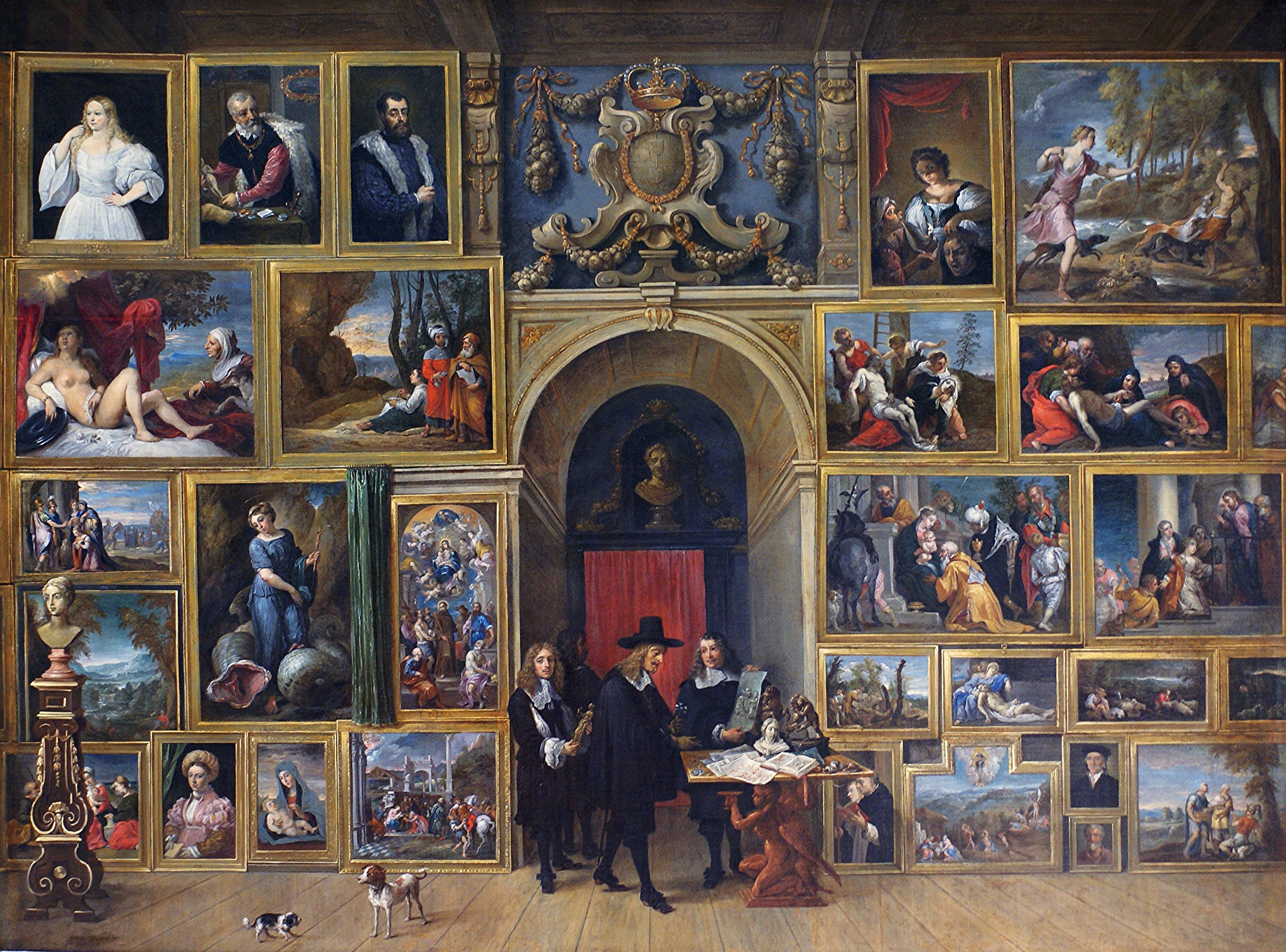
Gallery of the Archduke Leopold Wilhelm in Brussels; by David Teniers the Younger, 1651

== Ancestors ==
Ancestors of Archduke Leopold Wilhelm of Austria

16. Philip I of Castile
8. Ferdinand I, Holy Roman Emperor (= 22, 26)
17. Joanna of Castile
4. Charles II, Archduke of Austria
18. Vladislas II of Bohemia and Hungary
9. Anna of Bohemia and Hungary (= 23, 27)
19. Anna of Foix-Candale
2. Ferdinand II, Holy Roman Emperor
20. William IV, Duke of Bavaria (= 24)
10. Albert V, Duke of Bavaria (= 12)
21. Marie of Baden-Sponheim (= 25)
5. Maria Anna of Bavaria (≠ 3)
22. Ferdinand I, Holy Roman Emperor (= 8, 26)
11. Anna of Austria (= 13)
23. Anna of Bohemia and Hungary (= 9, 27)
1. Archduke Leopold Wilhelm of Austria
24. William IV, Duke of Bavaria (= 20)
12. Albert V, Duke of Bavaria (= 10)
25. Marie of Baden-Sponheim (= 21)
6. William V, Duke of Bavaria
26. Ferdinand I, Holy Roman Emperor (= 8, 22)
13. Anna of Austria (= 11)
27. Anna of Bohemia and Hungary (= 9, 23)
3. Maria Anna of Bavaria (≠ 5)
28. Antoine, Duke of Lorraine
14. Francis I, Duke of Lorraine
29. Renée of Bourbon-Montpensier
7. Renata of Lorraine
30. Christian II of Denmark
15. Christina of Denmark
31. Isabella of Austria

== Male-line family tree ==
House of Habsburg

Original line
Albert; Count of Habsburg c. 1188–1239
Rudolf I of Germany c. 1218–1291
Albert I of Germany; 1255–1308	Hartmann; 1263–1281	Rudolf II; Duke of Austria; 1270–1290
Rudolf I of Bohemia; 1281–1307	Frederick the Fair c. 1289–1330	Leopold I Duke of Austria; 1290–1326	Albert II; Duke of Austria; 1298–1358	Henry the Friendly; 1299–1327	Otto; Duke of Austria; 1301–1339	John; Parricida c. 1290–1312/1313
Albertinian line	Leopoldian line
Rudolf IV; Duke of Austria; 1339–1365	Frederick III; 1347–1362	Albert III; Duke of Austria; 1349–1395	Leopold III; Duke of Austria; 1351–1386	Frederick II; Duke of Austria; 1327–1344	Leopold II; Duke of Austria; 1328–1344
Albert IV; Duke of Austria; 1377–1404	William; Duke of Austria c. 1370–1406	Leopold IV; Duke of Austria; 1371–1411	Ernest; Duke of Austria; 1377–1424	Frederick IV; Duke of Austria; 1382–1439
Albert II of Germany; 1397–1439	Frederick III; HRE; 1415–1493	Albert VI; Archduke of Austria; 1418–1463	Sigismund; Archduke of Austria; 1427–1496
Ladislaus the Posthumous; 1440–1457	Maximilian I HRE; 1459–1519
Philip I of Castile; 1478–1506
Spanish / Iberian line	Austrian / HRE line
Charles V HRE; 1500–1558	Ferdinand I HRE; 1503–1564
Philip II of Spain; 1527–1598	Maximilian II; HRE; 1527–1576	Ferdinand II; Archduke of Austria; 1529–1595	Charles II; Archduke of Austria; 1540–1590
Carlos; Prince of Asturias; 1545–1568	Philip III of Spain; 1578–1621	Rudolf II; HRE; 1552–1612	Ernest of Austria; 1553–1595	Matthias; HRE; 1557–1619	Maximilian III; Archduke of Austria; 1558–1618	Albert VII; Archduke of Austria; 1559–1621	Wenceslaus; Archduke of Austria; 1561–1578	Andrew; Margrave of Burgau; 1558–1600	Charles; Margrave of Burgau; 1560–1618	Ferdinand II; HRE; 1578–1637	Maximilian Ernest of Austria; 1583–1616	Leopold V Archduke of Austria; 1586–1632	Charles of Austria; 1590–1624
Philip IV of Spain; 1605–1665	Charles of Austria; 1607–1632	Ferdinand of Austria; 1609–1641	John-Charles of Austria; 1605–1619	Ferdinand III; HRE; 1608–1657	Leopold Wilhelm of Austria; 1614–1662	Ferdinand Charles; Archduke of Austria; 1628–1662	Sigismund Francis; Archduke of Austria; 1630–1665
Balthasar Charles; Prince of Asturias; 1629–1646	Charles II of Spain; 1661–1700	Ferdinand IV; King of the Romans; 1633–1654	Leopold I HRE; 1640–1705	Charles Joseph of Austria; 1649–1664
Joseph I HRE; 1678–1711	Charles VI; HRE; 1685–1740
Lorraine
Maria Theresa; HRE; 1740–1780	Francis I HRE; 1745–1765
Habsburg-Lorraine
Joseph II; HRE; 1765–1790	Leopold II; HRE; 1790–1792
Francis II; HRE; 1792–1806

== Sources ==
- González Cuerva, Rubén; Tercero Casado, Luis (2017). "The Imperial Court during the Thirty Years War". In Caesar, Mathieu (ed.). Factional Struggles: Divided Elites in European Cities & Courts (1400-1750). BRILL. ISBN 978-9004344150.
- Schreiber, Renate (2004). "Ein Galeria nach meinem Humor": Erzherzog Leopold Wilhelm. Vienna: Kunsthistorisches Museum. ISBN 3854970854.
- Liedtke, Walter A. (1984). Flemish paintings in the Metropolitan Museum of Art. New York: The Metropolitan Museum of Art. ISBN 0870993569. (See index, v. 1, for more information on Leopold Wilhelm's patronage)

Leopold William of Austria House of Habsburg Born: 5 January 1614 in Wiener Neustadt Died: 20 November 1662 in Vienna
Catholic Church titles
Regnal titles
Preceded by Christian William of Brandenburg as Lutheran Administrator	Prince-Archbishop of Magdeburg^{1} 1631–1638	Succeeded by Augustus, Duke of Saxe-Weissenfels as Lutheran Administrator
Preceded by Christian William of Brandenburg as Lutheran Administrator	Prince-Bishop of Halberstadt^{1} 1628–1648	Secularised to the Principality of Halberstadt
Preceded by Frederick II, Crown Prince of Denmark as Lutheran Administrator	Prince-Archbishop of Bremen^{2} 1635–1645	Succeeded by Franz Wilhelm, Count of Wartenberg as Vicar Apostolic
Preceded by Leopold V, Archduke of Austria	Prince-Bishop of Strasbourg^{1} 1626–1662	Succeeded by Franz Egon of Fürstenberg
Preceded by Leopold V, Archduke of Austria	Prince-Bishop of Passau^{1} 1625–1662	Succeeded by Archduke Charles Joseph of Austria
Preceded by John Ernest Plateis of Plattenstein	Prince-Bishop of Olmütz^{1} 1637–1662	Succeeded by Archduke Charles Joseph of Austria
Preceded by Karol Ferdynand Vasa	Prince-Bishop of Breslau^{1} 1656–1662	Succeeded by Archduke Charles Joseph of Austria
Catholic Church titles
Preceded by John Caspar I, Lord of Stadion	Grand Master of the Teutonic Order; 1641–1662	Succeeded by Archduke Charles Joseph of Austria
Government offices
Preceded by Manuel de Moura, Marquis of Castelo Rodrigo	Governor of the Spanish Netherlands; 1647–1656	Succeeded by John of Austria, the Younger
Notes and references
1. Catholic Administrator, due to lack of canonical qualification 2. De jure only; de facto he was barred by the Swedish occupants
