= Maximilian Philipp Hieronymus, Duke of Bavaria-Leuchtenberg =

German noble

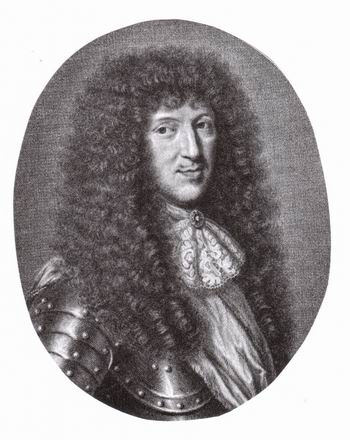
Maximilian Philipp Hieronymus, Duke of Bavaria-Leuchtenberg

Maximilian Philipp Hieronymus (30 September 1638, Munich - 20 March 1705, Turkheim) was a German prince. He was Duke of Bavaria-Leuchtenberg from 1650 until his death, and regent of Bavaria from 1679 to 1680 during the minority of his nephew Maximilian II, Elector of Bavaria.

== Early life ==
He was the second of two sons born to the Elector Maximilian I and his wife Archduchess Maria Anna of Austria. In 1650 his father exchanged the Reichsgrafschaft of Haag for the Landgraviate of Leuchtenberg with his brother Albert VI and invested Maximilian with Leuchtenberg and the Herrschaft of Schwabegg. Maximilian also acquired the lordships of Angelberg and Mattsies from the Fuggers.

== Personal life ==
In 1668 he married, at the Château-Thierry, Mauricienne Fébronie de La Tour d’Auvergne (1652-1706) (a.k.a. Princesse d'Evreux) daughter of Frédéric Maurice, sovereign Duke of Bouillon and his wife, Countess Eleonore-Catherine van Bergh, but the marriage remained childless and on Maxilimilian's death his duchy was re-absorbed into the domains of his nephew, Elector Maximilian II.

Preceded by Ferdinand Maria (Prince Elector)	Prince Administrator (Kuradministrator) of Bavaria; 1679–1680	Succeeded by Maximilian II Emanuel (Prince Elector)
