= Maximilian I of Bavaria =

Maximilian I of Bavaria may refer to:

- Maximilian I, Elector of Bavaria (1573–1651)
- Maximilian I Joseph of Bavaria (1756–1825)
