= Philipp of Bavaria =

German cardinal (1576-1598)

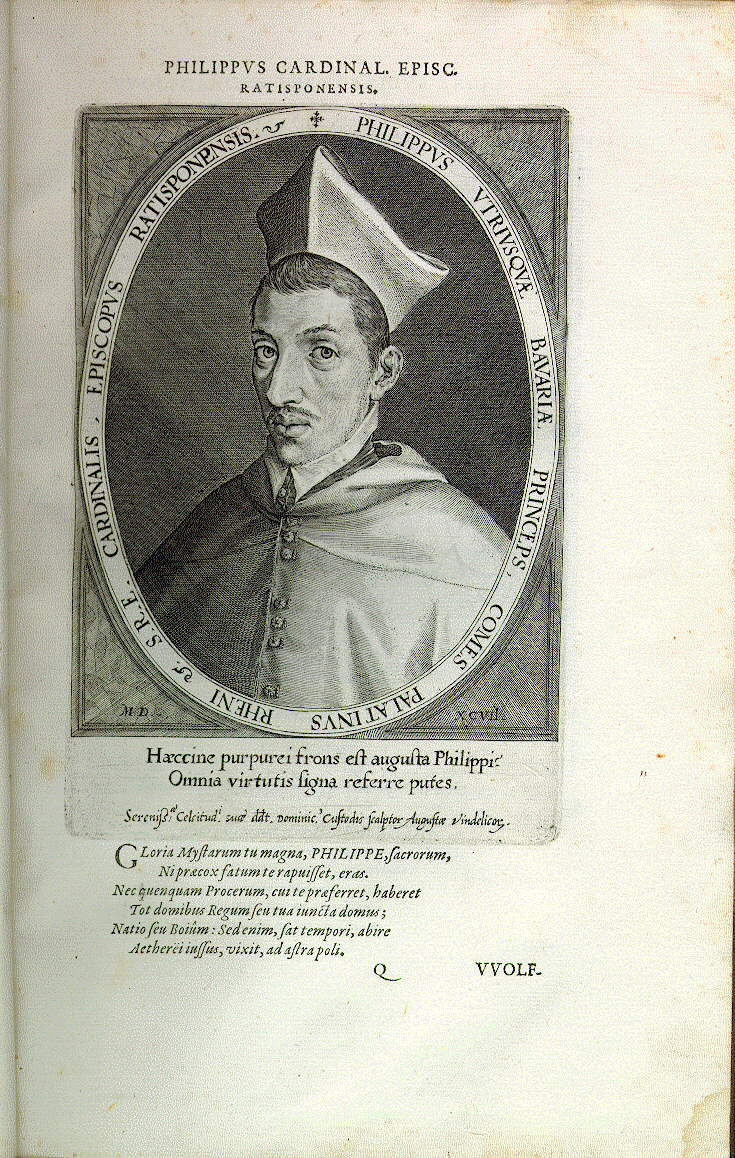
Philipp von Bayern

Philipp Wilhelm of Bavaria (born 22 September 1576, Munich; died 18 May 1598, Dachau) was a German cardinal.

== Life ==
The son of William V, Duke of Bavaria and Renata of Lorraine, he studied theology and philosophy at Ingolstadt University with his younger brother Ferdinand (later archbishop of Cologne). He was given the honorary posts of canon of Cologne, Mainz, Salzburg and Trier, having already been made prince bishop of Regensburg aged three. His father hoped Philipp's election as bishop would bind the diocese more strongly to the duchy of Bavaria and defend against the Protestant forces in the city of Regensburg. During his minority Philipp was represented by Felizian Ninguarda. In 1582, his post was given to the Bohemian Baron Zbinko Berka. In 1586, Zbinko and Philipp's father came into tension and so Zbinko handed over the diocese's administration to Jakob Miller in 1586. Philipp was made a cardinal by pope Clement VIII in the consistory of 18 December 1596, but he died in a riding accident two years later and is buried in the Munich Frauenkirche (there is also a bronze memorial to him in Regensburg Cathedral).
