= Hans Krumpper =

German sculptor (c.1570–1634)

Hans Krumpper (c.1570 – between 7 and 14 May 1634) was a German sculptor, plasterer, architect, and painter. He was an intendant of the arts who served the Bavarian dukes William V and Maximilian I.

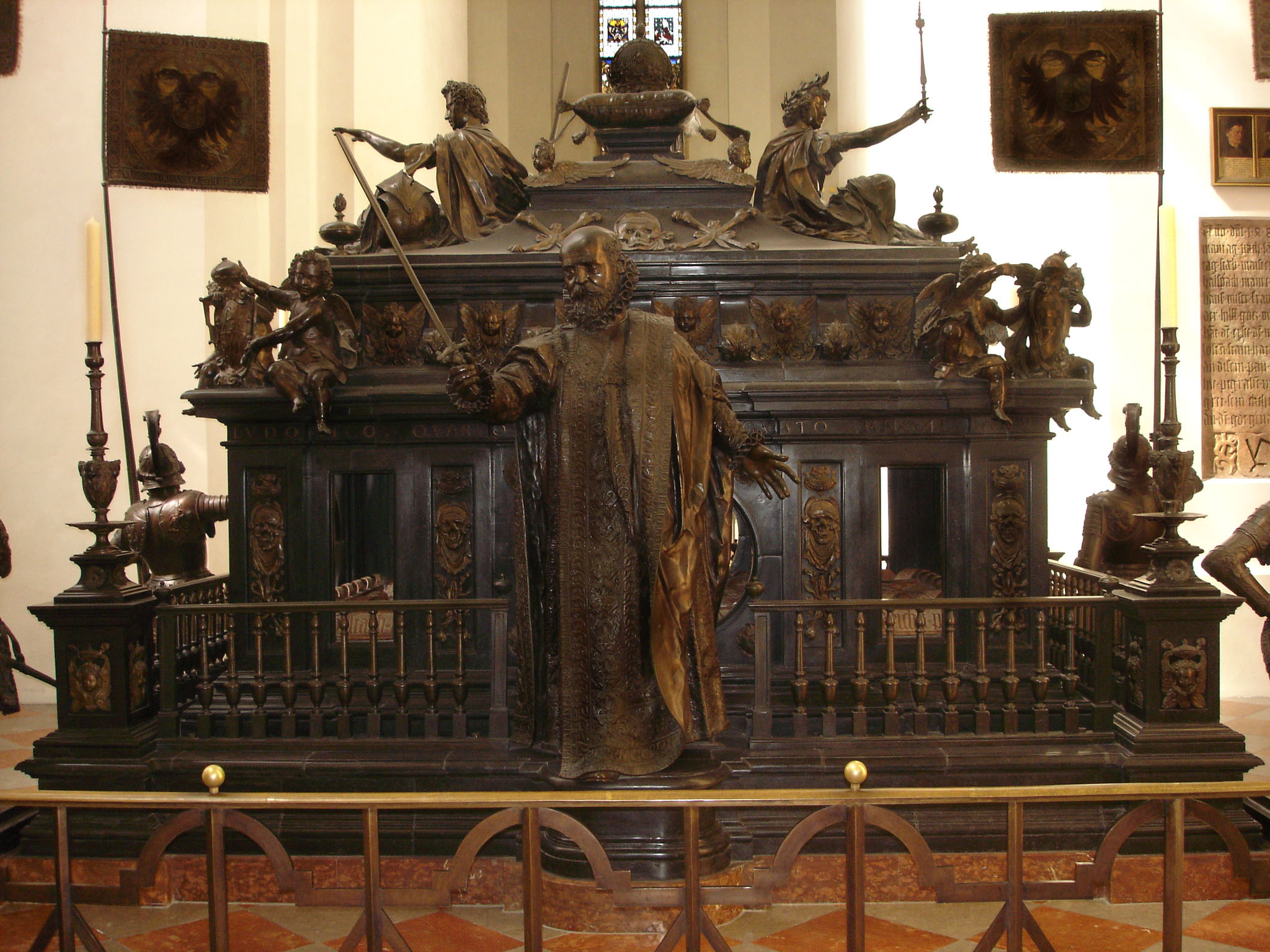
Tomb monument of Emperor Louis IV in the Frauenkirche, Munich

Krumpper was born in Weilheim in Oberbayern.

He worked for the Bavarian court from 1584, where he trained as a sculptor with Hubert Gerhard. In 1599 he succeeded Friedrich Sustris, and in 1609 he became the chief sculptor to the court. He was strongly influenced by the Italian and Dutch mannerism and became the creator of the first self-contained Bavarian Early Baroque sculptures. He died in Munich.

Among his masterpieces are the Old Residence in Munich and the Tomb monument of Emperor Louis IV in the Munich Frauenkirche. His main work, the church of the minims in Munich was demolished in 1902.

== Gallery ==
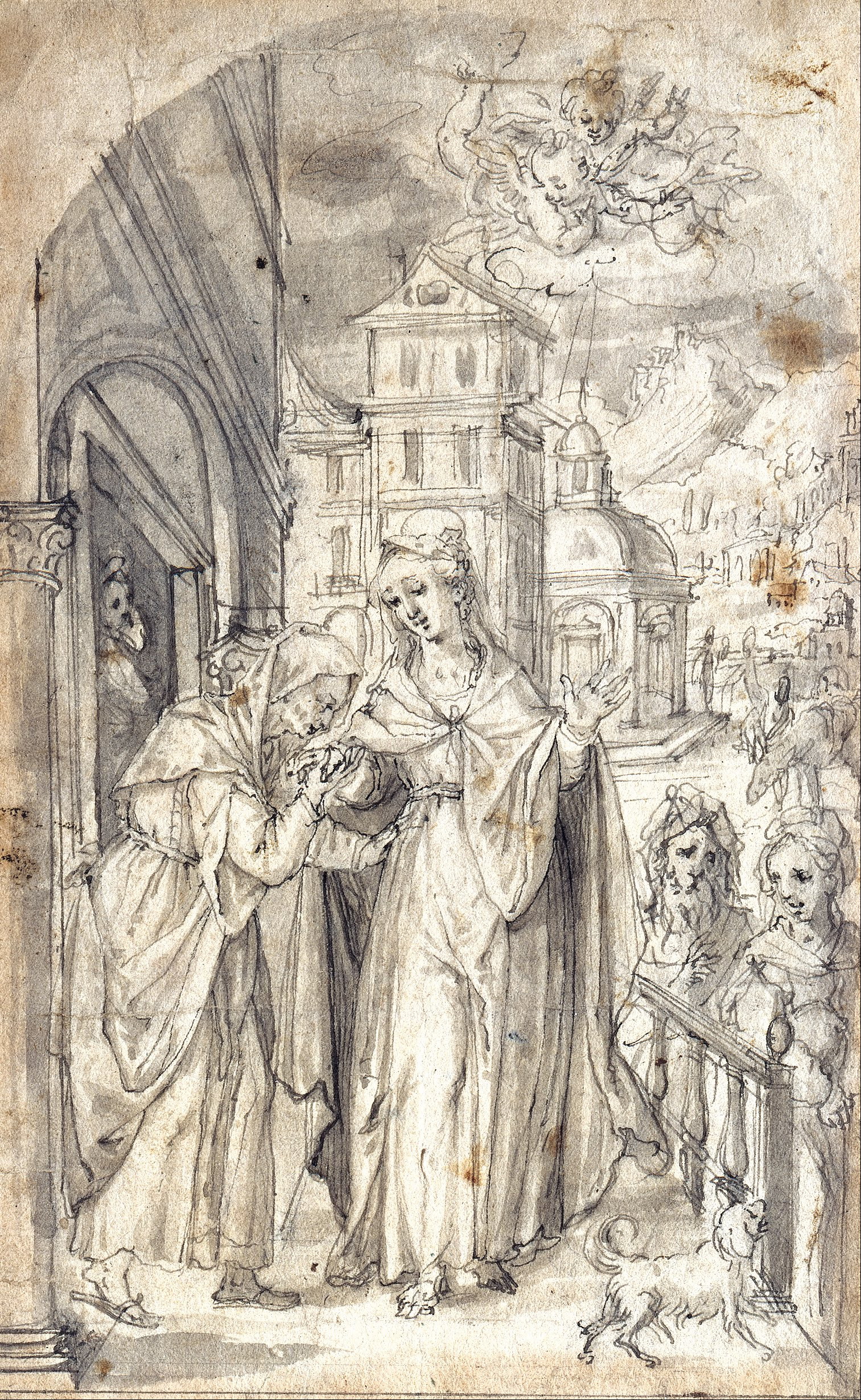
The Visitation (1610 - 1620)

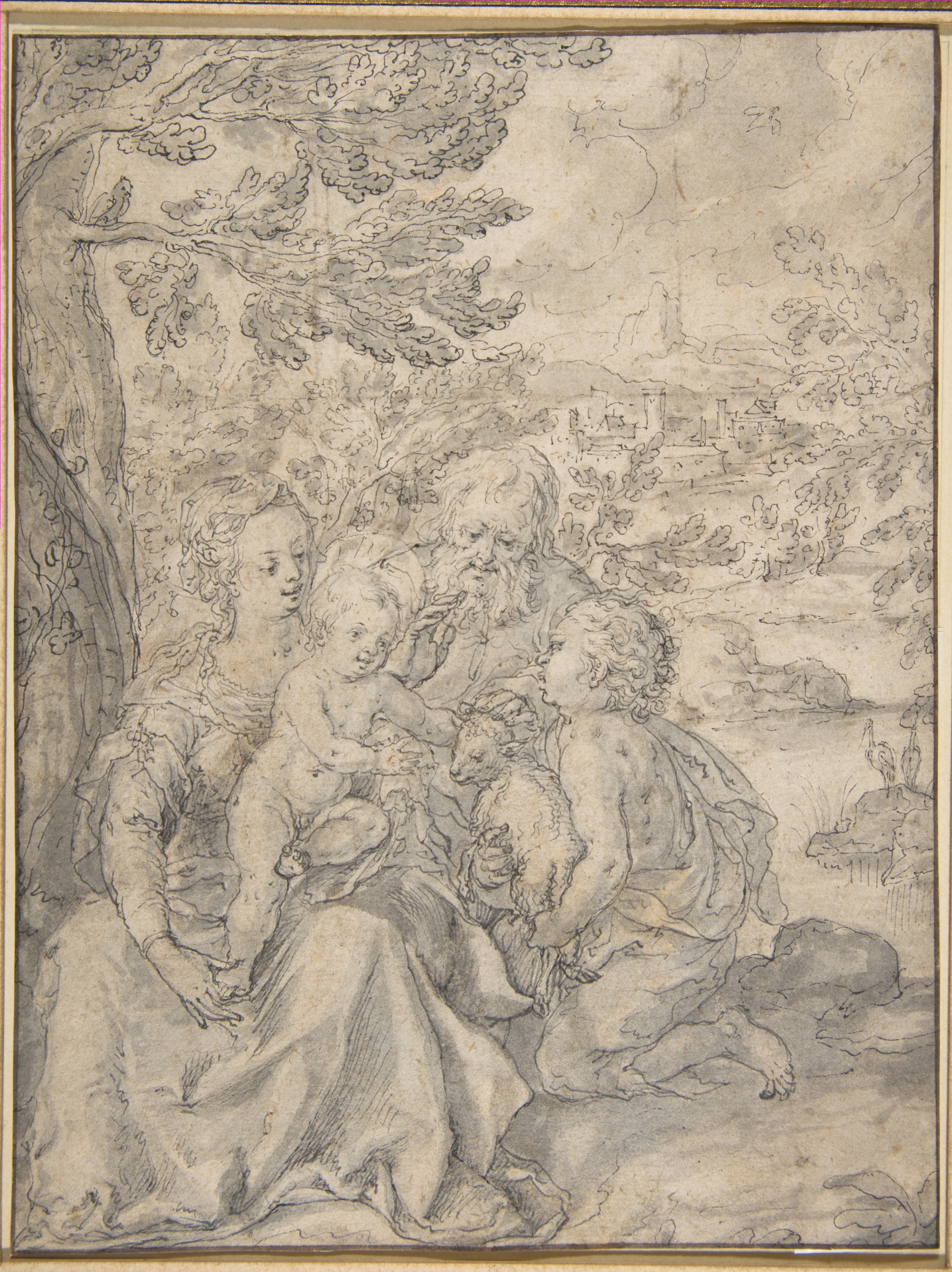
Holy Family with the Infant Saint John the Baptist

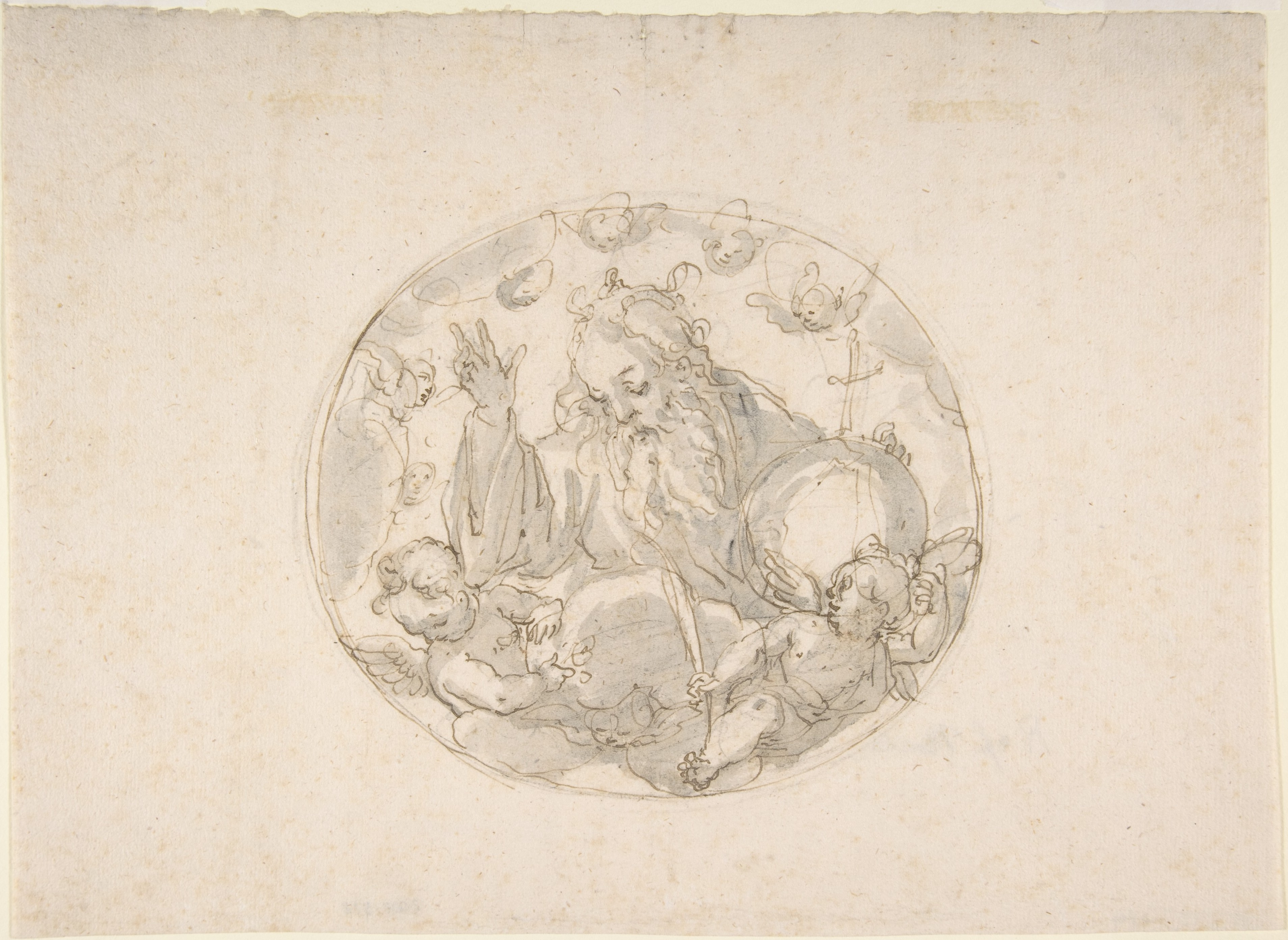
God the Father with the Globe
