= Marco Bragadino =

Venetian conman (c.1545-1591)

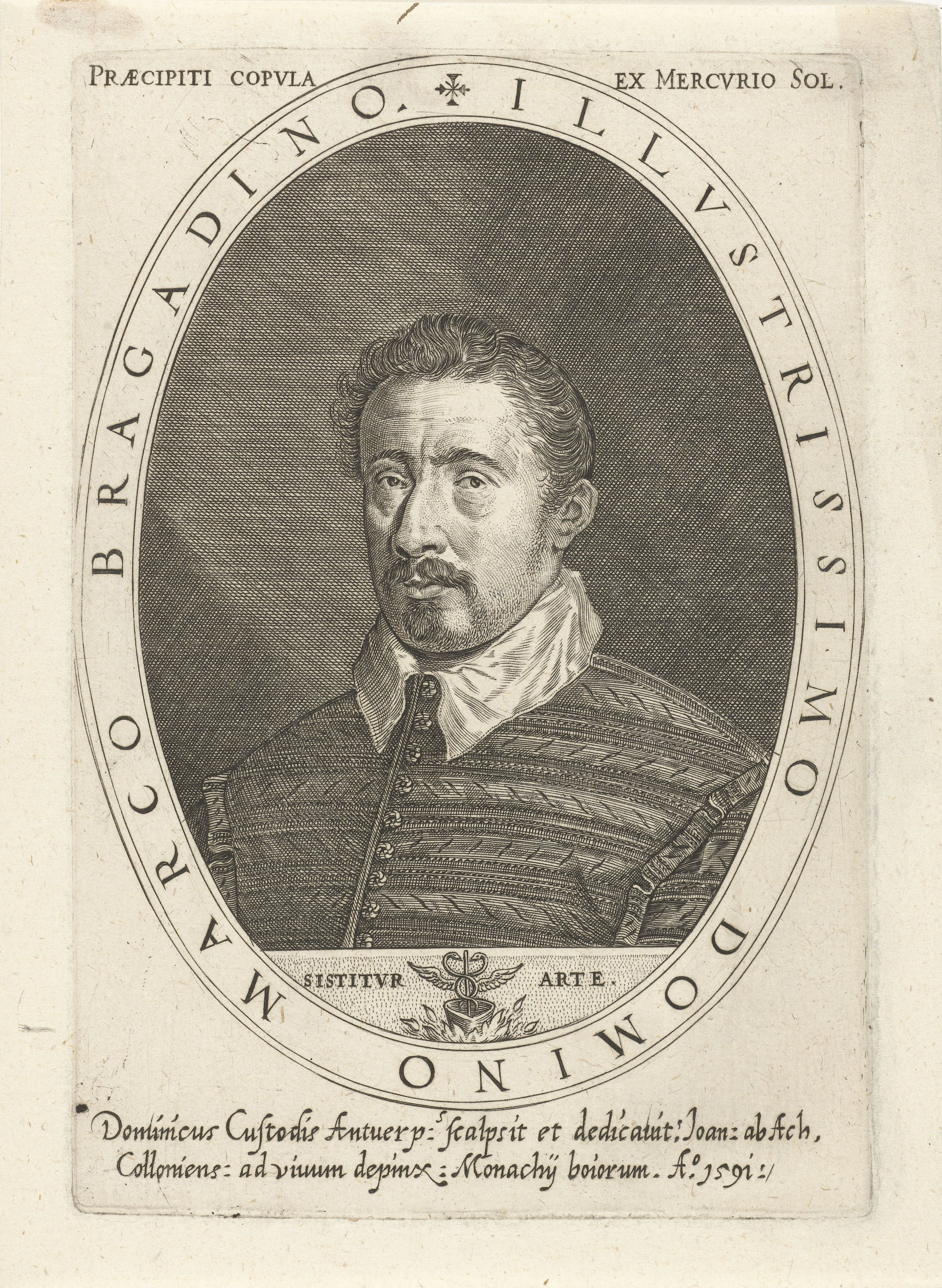
Bragadino's portrait

Marco Bragadino or Marco Bragadini (c. 1545 – 26 April 1591) was a Venetian confidence man who claimed to be an alchemist. His name at birth is said to have been Mamugna, but he impersonated the son of the dead military officer Marco Antonio Bragadin. He convinced the government of Venice to finance his research into producing gold from base metals.

== Life ==
Almost nothing is known about Bragadino's childhood and youth. After the conquest of Cyprus by the Ottoman Empire, his family presumably left the island for Venice like many other Christians. He was of Greek descent, but pretended to be an illegitimate son of Venetian condottiero Marco Antonio Bragadin, murdered by the Turks after the siege of Famagusta. In Venice, Bragadino is thought to have met Hieronymus Scotus, from whom he learned the secrets of alchemy and the tricks of pretending to make gold.

=== Journeyman in Italy ===
It is unknown why Bragadino had to leave Venice, but from 1574 to 1579 he stayed in Florence and was in contact with Grand Duchess Bianca Cappello, whom he promised to heal from infertility with the philosopher's stone. This may explain the large amount of money (Minucci writes of at least 40,000 scudi) that Bragadino spent during this period. Later, Bragadino moved to Rome to escape his creditors, and became a monk in a Capuchin monastery. He received the minor consecrations and also a higher one, becoming Subdeacon. In 1588, he left the cloister without permission. He is reported to have visited Geneva, England and France. As he returned to Italy, as a renegade monk, he had to face the Inquisition. To protect himself, Bragadino used his "gold-making" alchemy to make numerous influential friends. The most prominent of these friends was the Duke of Mantua, who paid 25,000 scudi to Bragadino.

=== Venice ===
The Republic of Venice invited its former citizen as an official guest to profit from his abilities. On 26 November 1589 Bragadino entered the city as a celebrated alchemist. But because he was not able to "create" any noteworthy amounts of money he escaped Venice in April 1590, heading for Padua.

=== Bavaria ===
In Padua, he was called upon by William V, Duke of Bavaria. In August 1590, Bragadino arrived at the Duke's court on Trausnitz Castle in Landshut. He quickly gained the Duke's trust, not only by promising to make copious amounts of gold to erase the Duke's debts, but also by offering to cure the Duke's severe headache. Moreover, he tried to receive a dispensation of his priestly consecration from the Pope, using the Duke's envoys, but in vain.

By order of the Duke, Bragadino was executed by beheading on 26 April 1591 in Munich's Weinmarkt square. The act turned into a disaster as the executioner had to use three strikes with the sword until Bragadino's head was eventually cut off.

== Legacy ==
His role as a colourful figure in the history of alchemy is still remembered today in the carnival lecture of the Institute of Anorganic Chemistry at the Technical University of Munich.

His adventurous life provides input for thematic conducted tours in Munich and Landshut.
