= Maria Anna of Bavaria (born 1574) =

Archduchess of Austria from 1600 to 1616

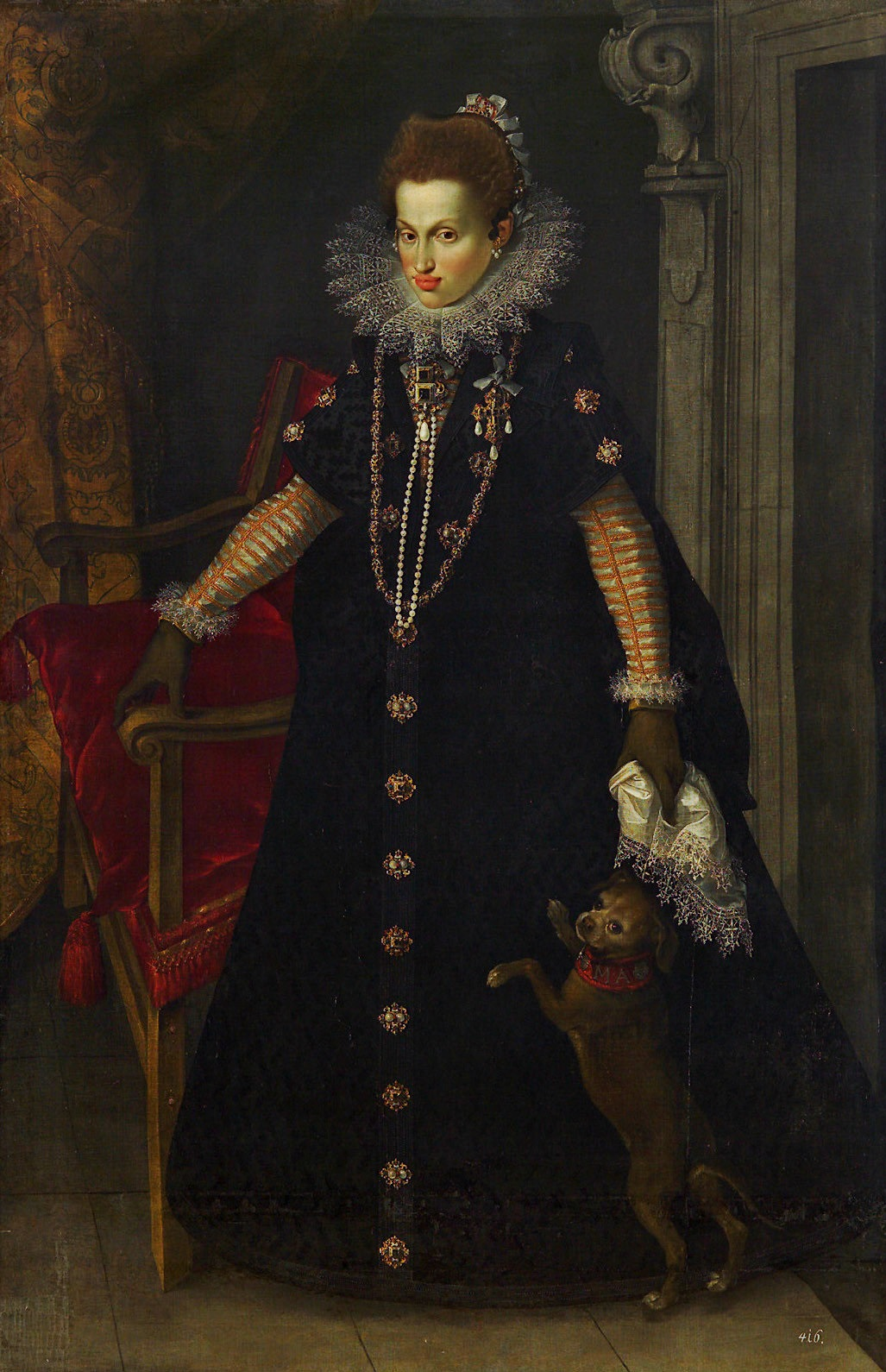
- Portrait by Joseph Heintz the Elder, 1604

Archduchess consort of Inner Austria
- Tenure: 23 April 1600 – 8 March 1616
- Born: 18 December 1574; Munich, Duchy of Bavaria, Holy Roman Empire
- Died: 8 March 1616 (aged 41); Graz, Archduchy of Austria, Holy Roman Empire
- Spouse: Ferdinand II, Holy Roman Emperor (m. 1600)
- Issue: Ferdinand III, Holy Roman Emperor; Maria Anna, Electress of Bavaria; Cecilia Renata, Queen of Poland; Archduke Leopold Wilhelm of Austria
- House: Wittelsbach
- Father: William V, Duke of Bavaria
- Mother: Renata of Lorraine

Maria Anna of Bavaria (18 December 1574 – 8 March 1616) was a German princess, a member of the House of Wittelsbach by birth and an Archduchess consort of Inner Austria by marriage.

Born in Munich, she was the fourth child and second (but eldest surviving) daughter of William V, Duke of Bavaria and Renata of Lorraine.

== Life ==
On 23 April 1600, Maria Anna married her first cousin Ferdinand, Archduke of Inner Austria at Graz Cathedral. This marriage reaffirmed the alliance between the House of Habsburg and House of Wittelsbach. Without interfering in politics, Maria Anna lived in her husband's shadow. She gave him seven children, five of whom lived to adulthood.

Maria Anna died in Graz aged 41, three years before the coronation of her husband as King of Bohemia and King of Hungary and his elevation to Holy Roman Emperor, so she was never a Holy Roman Empress. She was buried in the Mausoleum near the Cathedral in Graz.

== Issue ==
- Archduchess Christine (25 May 1601 – 12/21 June 1601), died in infancy.
- Archduke Charles (born and died 25 May 1603).
- Archduke John-Charles (1 November 1605 – 28 December 1619), died unmarried.
- Ferdinand III (13 July 1608 – 2 April 1657), Holy Roman Emperor, King of Hungary and Bohemia, who married:
  - Maria Anna of Spain in 1631
  - Maria Leopoldine of Austria in 1648
  - Eleanor Gonzaga in 1651
- Archduchess Maria Anna (13 January 1610 – 25 September 1665), who was married on 15 July 1635 to Maximilian I, Elector of Bavaria (her uncle).
- Archduchess Cecilia Renata (16 July 1611 – 24 March 1644), who was married on 9 August 1637 to Wladyslaw IV, King of Poland (her cousin).
- Archduke Leopold Wilhelm (6 January 1614 – 20 November 1662), Bishop of Passau and Strasbourg (1625–37), Olmütz (1637–55), Breslau (1655–62), Governor of the Spanish Netherlands (1647–56), Grand Master of the Teutonic Order (1641–62). He died unmarried.

== Ancestry ==
Ancestors of Maria Anna of Bavaria (born 1574)

16. Albert IV, Duke of Bavaria
8. William IV, Duke of Bavaria
17. Kunigunde of Austria
4. Albert V, Duke of Bavaria
18. Philip I, Margrave of Baden
9. Jakobaea of Baden
19. Elisabeth of the Palatinate
2. William V, Duke of Bavaria
20. Philip I of Castile (=30)
10. Ferdinand I, Holy Roman Emperor
21. Joanna I of Castile (=31)
5. Anna of Austria
22. Vladislaus II of Bohemia and Hungary
11. Anna of Bohemia and Hungary
23. Anne of Foix-Candale
1. Maria Anna of Bavaria
24. René II, Duke of Lorraine
12. Antoine, Duke of Lorraine
25. Philippa of Guelders
6. Francis I, Duke of Lorraine
26. Gilbert, Count of Montpensier
13. Renée of Bourbon-Montpensier
27. Clara Gonzaga
3. Renata of Lorraine
28. John of Denmark
14. Christian II of Denmark
29. Christina of Saxony
7. Christina of Denmark
30. Philip I of Castile (=20)
15. Isabella of Austria
31. Joanna I of Castile (=21)
