= 1658 imperial election =

Elections for the emperor of the Holy Roman Empire

- 18 July 1658

7 Prince-electors (Note: One elector, Leopold I, holding the Bohemian electoral vote, abstained from the ballot.) 5 votes needed to win
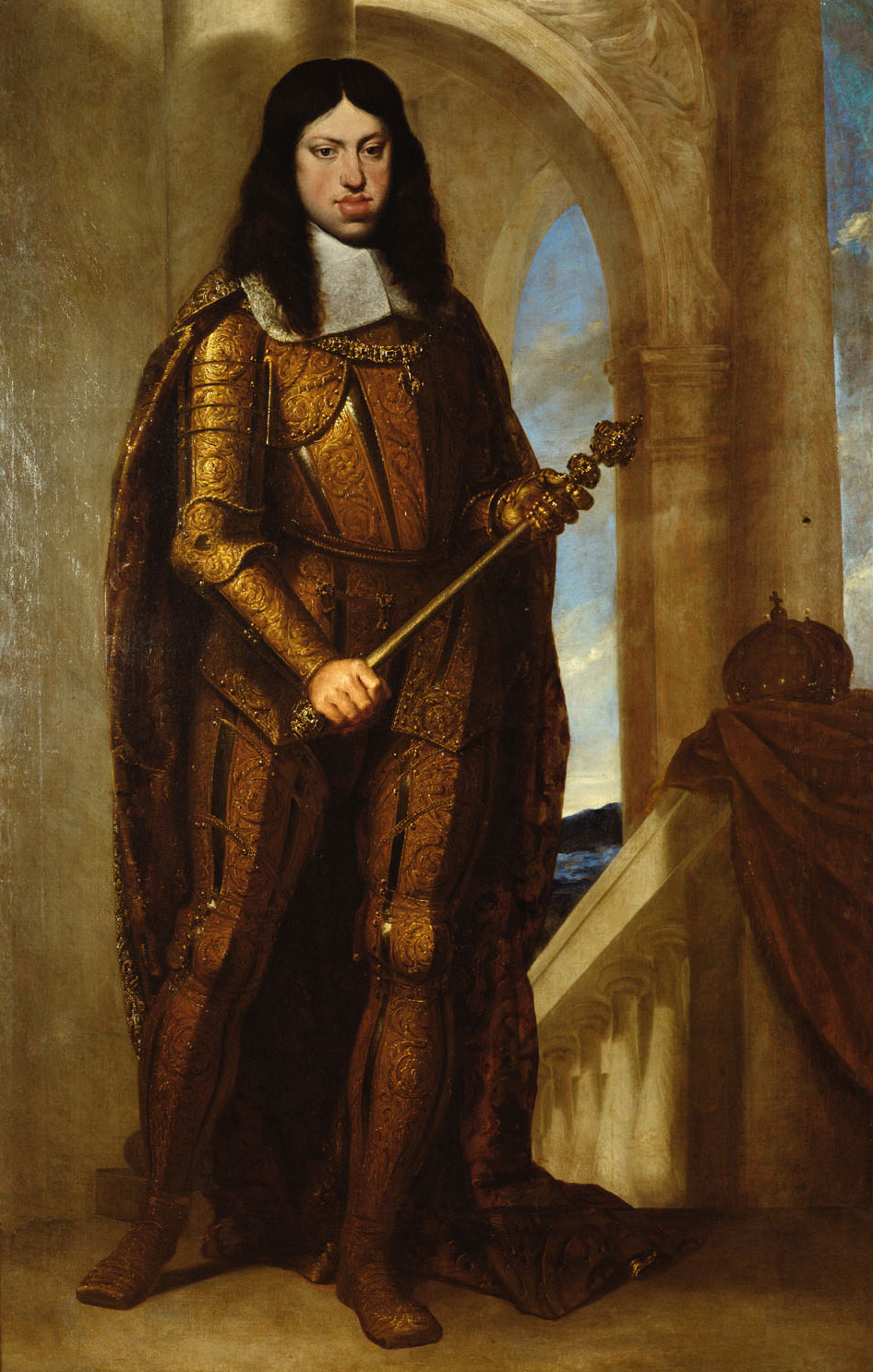
Candidate	Leopold I
House	Habsburg
Electoral vote	7
Percentage	100%
Emperor before election
Ferdinand III
House of Habsburg
Elected Emperor
Leopold I
House of Habsburg

The imperial election of 1658 was an imperial election held to select the emperor of the Holy Roman Empire. It took place in Frankfurt on 18 July.

== Background ==
The death of Ferdinand III, Holy Roman Emperor, on 2 April 1657 was followed by the longest interregnum since the 13th century. This was largely a result of the youth of Ferdinand's surviving son Leopold, who was only seventeen at the time of his father's death. It was generally agreed that the emperor had to be at least eighteen years old. Cardinal Mazarin, the French chief minister, hoped to prevent Leopold's election and to secure either the election of his king Louis XIV or, at least, a candidate from outside the House of Habsburg such as Ferdinand Maria, Elector of Bavaria. The electors called to choose Ferdinand's successor were:

- Johann Philipp von Schönborn, elector of Mainz
- Karl Kaspar von der Leyen, elector of Trier
- Maximilian Henry of Bavaria, elector of Cologne
- Ferdinand Maria, elector of Bavaria
- John George II, elector of Saxony
- Frederick William, elector of Brandenburg
- Charles I Louis, elector of the Electoral Palatinate
- Leopold I, King of Bohemia

Following the precedent set by his elder brother in the election of 1653, Leopold abstained from the vote.

== Election results ==
Mazarin's efforts were unsuccessful and Leopold was elected with little difficulty. He was crowned at Frankfurt on August 1.
