= Maximilian I, Elector of Bavaria =

Duke of Bavaria from 1597 to 1623, Elector of Bavaria from 1623 to 1651

Maximilian I
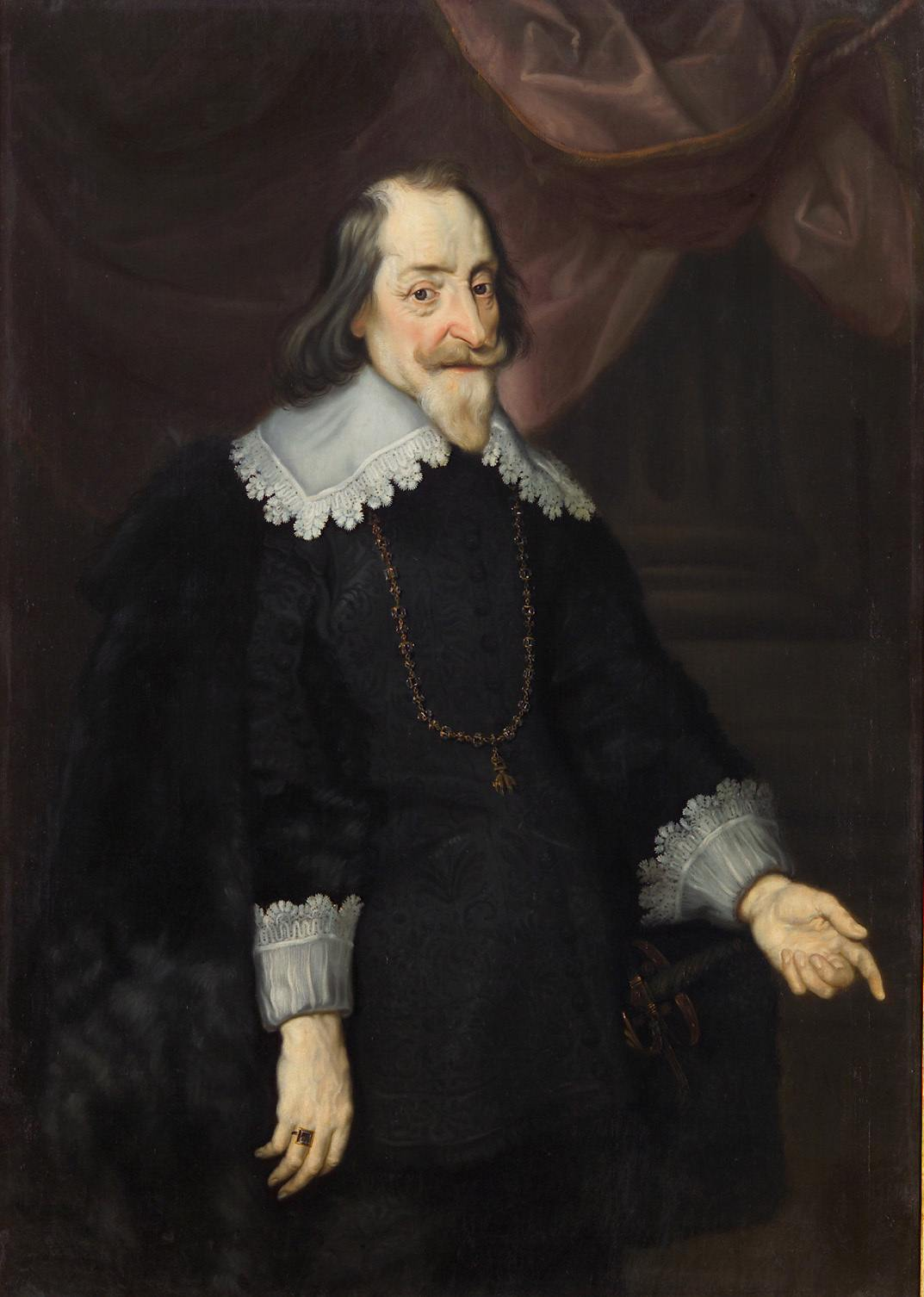
- Portrait by Joachim von Sandrart (1643)

Duke of Bavaria
- Reign: 15 October 1597 – 25 February 1623
- Predecessor: William V

Elector of Bavaria
- Reign: 25 February 1623 – 27 September 1651
- Successor: Ferdinand Maria

Elector Palatine
- Reign: 23 February 1623 – 24 October 1648
- Predecessor: Frederick V
- Successor: Charles I Louis
- Born: 17 April 1573; Munich, Duchy of Bavaria, Holy Roman Empire
- Died: 27 September 1651 (aged 78); Ingolstadt, Electorate of Bavaria, Holy Roman Empire
- Burial: St. Michael's Church, Munich
- Spouses: Elisabeth of Lorraine (m. 1595; died 1635) Maria Anna of Austria (m. 1635)
- Issue: Ferdinand Maria, Elector of Bavaria; Duke Maximilian Philipp Hieronymus
- House: Wittelsbach
- Father: William V, Duke of Bavaria
- Mother: Renata of Lorraine
- Religion: Roman Catholicism

Maximilian I (17 April 1573 – 27 September 1651), occasionally called the Great, a member of the House of Wittelsbach, ruled as Duke of Bavaria from 1597. His reign was marked by the Thirty Years' War during which his title was elevated to that of prince-elector of the Holy Roman Empire at the 1623 Diet of Regensburg.

Maximilian was a capable monarch who, by overcoming the feudal rights of the local estates (Landstände), laid the foundations for absolutist rule in Bavaria. A devout Catholic, he was one of the leading proponents of the Counter-Reformation and founder of the Catholic League of Imperial Princes. In the Thirty Years' War, he was able to conquer the Upper Palatinate region, as well as the Electoral Palatinate affiliated with the electoral dignity of his Wittelsbach cousin, the "Winter King" Frederick V. The 1648 Peace of Westphalia affirmed his possession of Upper Palatinate and the hereditary electoral title, though it returned the Electoral Palatinate to Frederick's heir and created an eighth electoral dignity for them.

== Background ==
Maximilian I was born in Munich, the eldest son of William V, Duke of Bavaria and Renata of Lorraine to survive infancy. He was educated by the Jesuits, and following his father's increasing difficulties in ruling the country, began to take part in the government round 1591, but latest 1594. In 1595 he married his cousin, Elisabeth Renata (also known as Elizabeth of Lorraine), daughter of Charles III, Duke of Lorraine, and became Duke of Bavaria upon his father's abdication in 1597.

His first marriage to Elisabeth Renata was childless. A few months after the death of Elisabeth Renata, Maximilian married, on 15 July 1635 in Vienna, his 25-year-old niece Maria Anna of Austria (1610–1665), the daughter of Ferdinand II, Holy Roman Emperor and Maximilian's sister, Maria Anna of Bavaria (1574–1616). The main motivation for this swift remarriage was not so much political grounds as the hope of producing a prince to inherit. In contrast to the Elector's first wife, Maria Anna was very interested in politics and well instructed about developments. She was not bound to the Habsburgs, but rather completely advocated the Bavarian standpoint. Additionally, she conducted lively exchanges of opinion with high officials of the Munich court and took part in meetings of the cabinet. By her he left two sons, Ferdinand Maria, who succeeded him, and Maximilian Philip.

As the ablest prince of his age, he sought to prevent Germany from becoming the battleground of Europe, and although a rigid adherent of the Catholic faith, was not always subservient to the church. Weak in health, Maximilian had high ambitions both for himself and his duchy, and was resourceful in prosecuting his designs.

== German politics and the Thirty Years' War ==
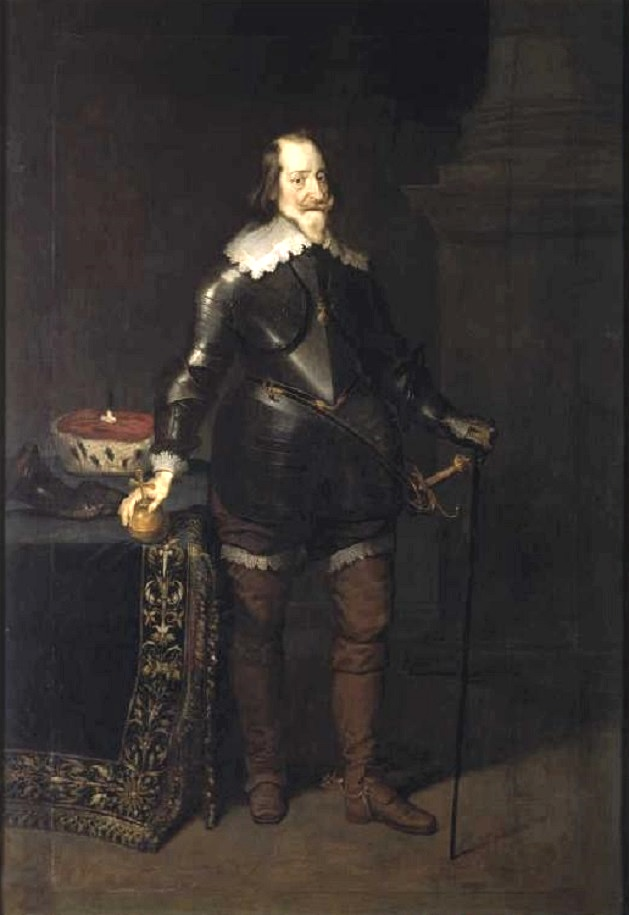
Portrait in armour by Nikolaus Prucker

Maximilian refrained from any interference in German politics until 1607, when he was entrusted with the duty of executing the imperial ban against the free city of Donauwörth, a Protestant stronghold. In December 1607 his troops occupied the city, and vigorous steps were taken to restore the supremacy of Catholicism. Some Protestant princes, alarmed at this action, formed the Protestant Union to defend their interests, which was answered in 1609 by the establishment of the Catholic League, in the formation of which Maximilian took an important part. Under his leadership an army was set on foot, but his policy was strictly defensive and he refused to allow the League to become a tool in the hands of the House of Habsburg. Dissensions among his colleagues led the duke to resign his office in 1616, but the approach of trouble brought about his return to the League about two years later.

The arms of Maximilian, Duke of Bavaria, Arch-Steward and Prince-Elector

Having refused to become a candidate for the imperial throne in the 1619 imperial election, Maximilian was faced with the complications arising from the Bohemian Revolt. After some delay he made a treaty with Ferdinand II, Holy Roman Emperor in October 1619, and in return for large concessions placed the forces of the League at the emperor's service. Anxious to curtail the area of the struggle, he made a treaty of neutrality with the Protestant Union, and occupied Upper Austria as security for the expenses of the campaign. On 8 November 1620 his troops under Johann Tserclaes, Count of Tilly defeated the forces of Frederick, King of Bohemia and Count Palatine of the Rhine, at the Battle of White Mountain near Prague. Subsequently Ferdinand II released Upper Austria as a pawn for Maximilian until 1628.

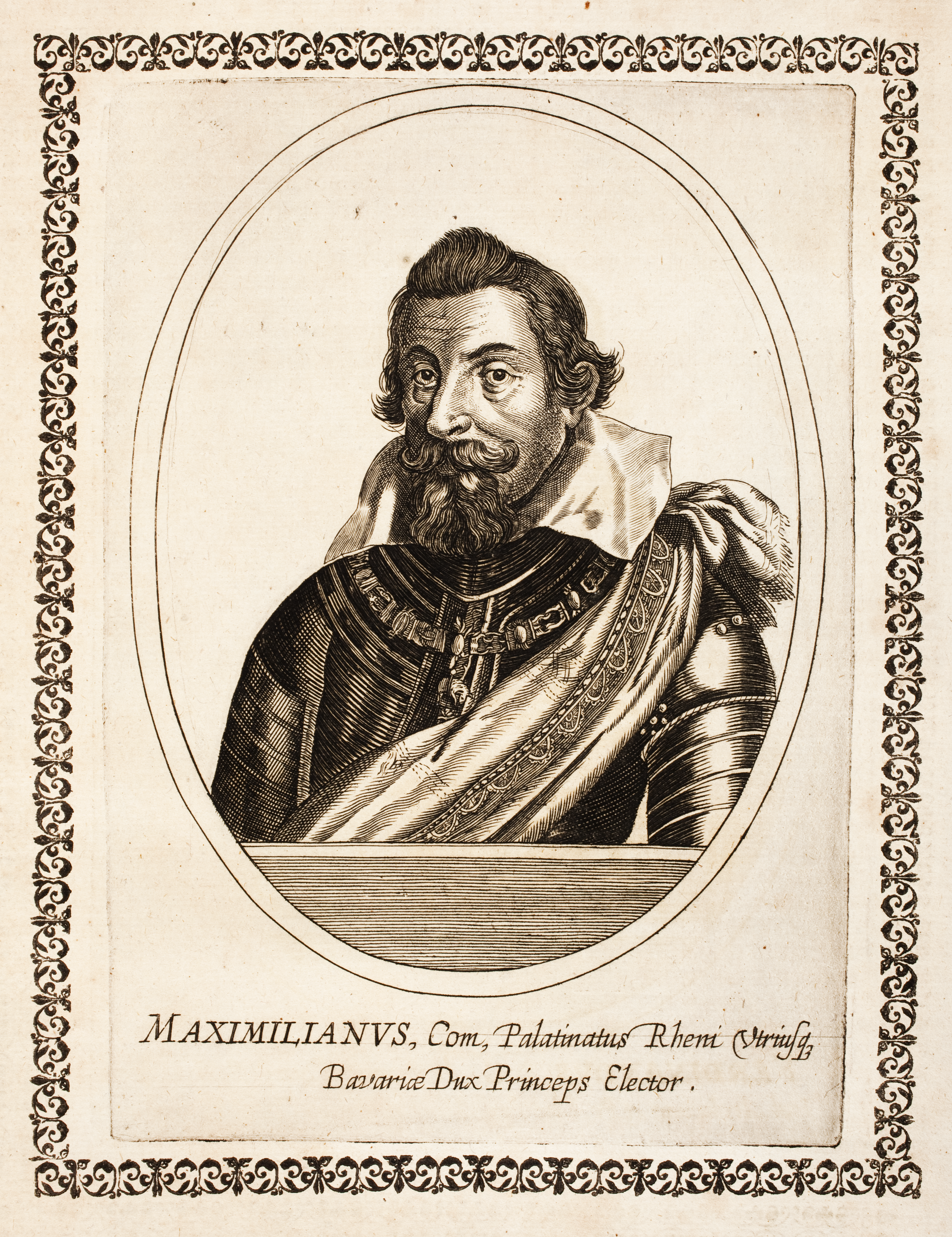
Engraving of Maximilian I

In spite of the arrangement with the Union, Tilly then devastated the Rhenish Palatinate, and in February 1623 Maximilian was formally invested with the electoral dignity and the attendant office of Arch-Steward, which had been enjoyed since 1356 by the Counts Palatine of the Rhine. After receiving the Upper Palatinate and restoring Upper Austria to Ferdinand, Maximilian became leader of the party which sought to bring about Albrecht von Wallenstein's dismissal from the imperial service. At the Diet of Regensburg (1630) Ferdinand was compelled to assent to this demand, but the sequel was disastrous both for Bavaria and its ruler. Attempting to remain neutral during the war, Maximilian signed the secret Treaty of Fontainebleau (1631) with the Kingdom of France, but this proved worthless.

Early in 1632 Gustavus Adolphus of Sweden marched into the electorate and occupied Munich, and Maximilian could only obtain the assistance of the Imperial troops by placing himself under the orders of Wallenstein, now restored to the command of the emperor's forces. The ravages of the Swedes and their French allies induced the elector to enter into negotiations for peace with the Swedes and Cardinal Richelieu of France. He also wooed the Protestants by proposing modifications to the Edict of Restitution of 1629, but these efforts were abortive.

In September 1638 Baron Franz von Mercy was made master-general of ordnance in the army of Bavaria, then the second largest army in the Holy Roman Empire. Mercy and Johann von Werth as lieutenant field-marshal fought with varying success France and Sweden.

In March 1647 Maximilian concluded the Truce of Ulm (1647) with France and Sweden, but the entreaties of Ferdinand III, Holy Roman Emperor led him to disregard his undertaking. Bavaria was again ravaged, and the elector's forces were defeated in May 1648 at the Battle of Zusmarshausen. The Peace of Westphalia soon put an end to the struggle. By this treaty it was agreed that Maximilian would retain the electoral dignity, which was made hereditary in his family along with the Upper Palatinate. Maximilian had to give up the Lower Palatinate, which was restored to Charles Louis, Frederick V's son and heir.

== Administrative and cultural activities ==
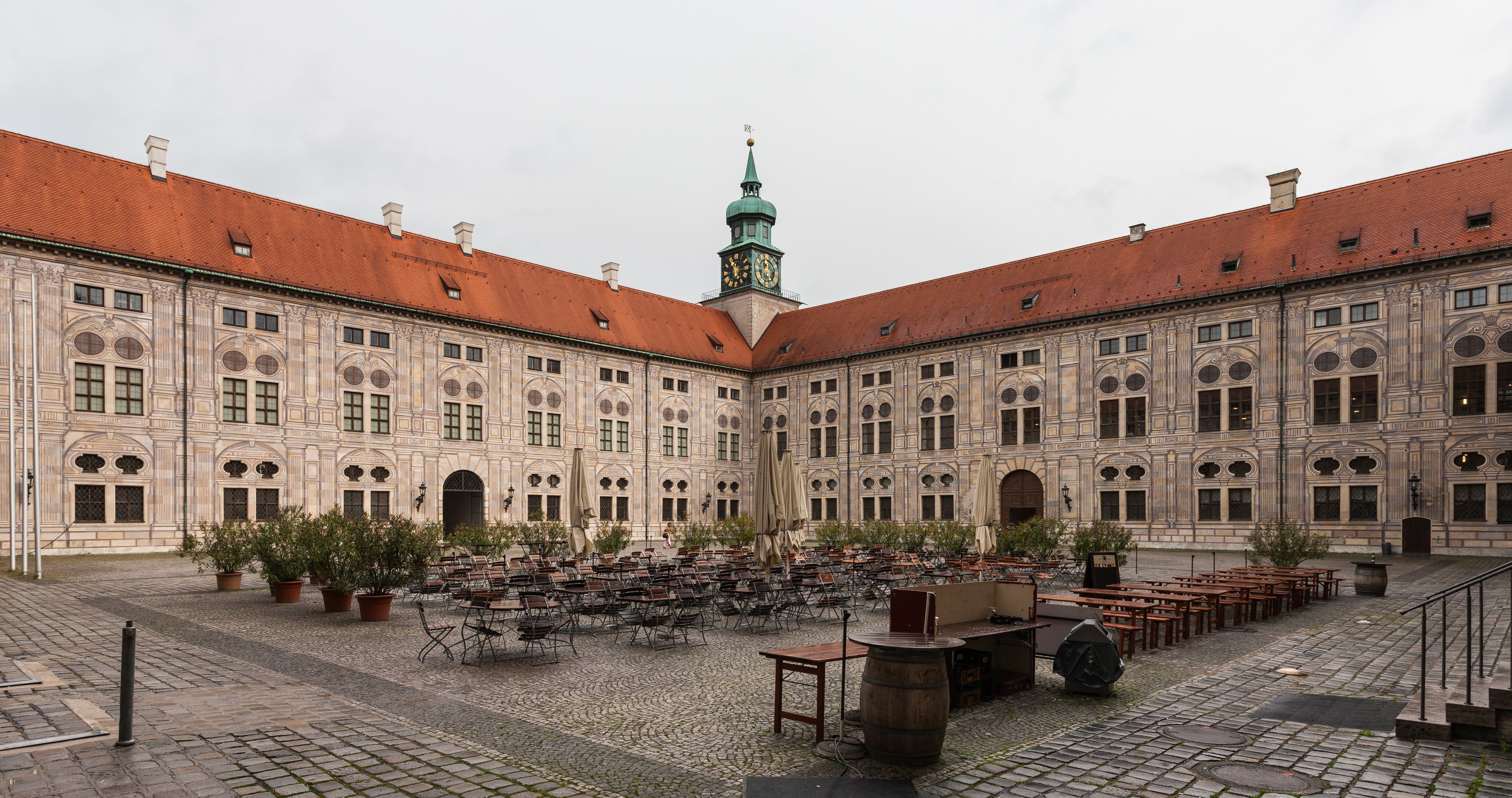
Kaiserhof, part of Maximilian's Residenz in Munich

Maximilian rehabilitated the Bavarian state finances, reorganised the Bavarian administration and army, and introduced mercantilist measures as well as a new corpus juris, the Codex Maximilianeus. In 1610 Maximilian ordered to enlarge the Munich Residenz and to upgrade the Hofgarten. The original buildings of Schleissheim Palace were extended between 1617 and 1623 by Heinrich Schön and Hans Krumpper to the so-called Old Palace. Maximilian acquired numerous paintings of Albrecht Dürer, Peter Paul Rubens and additional artists for the Wittelsbach collection. In 1616 for example Maximilian I commissioned four hunt paintings from Peter Paul Rubens. He even obtained Dürer's The Four Apostles in the year 1627 due to pressure on the Nuremberg city fathers. Among his court artists were Peter Candid, Friedrich Sustris, Hubert Gerhard, Hans Krumpper, Adrian de Vries and Georg Petel.

The Duke died at Ingolstadt on 27 September 1651. He is buried in St. Michael's Church, Munich. In 1839 a statue was erected to his memory at Munich by King Ludwig I of Bavaria.

== Family and children ==
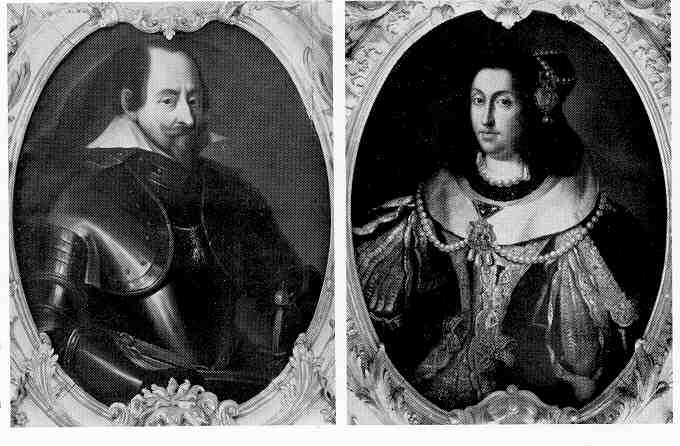
Maximilian I, Elector and Duke of Bavaria and his second wife, Maria Anna of Austria

On 6 February 1595, Maximilian married his first cousin princess Elisabeth (1574–1635), daughter of Charles III, Duke of Lorraine and Claudia of France, daughter of Henry II of France, in Nancy. They had no issue.

On 15 July 1635, Maximilian married his niece Maria Anna of Austria (1610–1665), daughter of Ferdinand II, Holy Roman Emperor and Maria Anna of Bavaria (1574–1616), in Vienna. They had two sons:

- Ferdinand Maria (1636–1679), who married in 1652 Henriette Adelaide of Savoy (1636–1676)
- Maximilian Philipp Hieronymus, Duke of Leuchtenberg (1638–1705), who married in 1668 Mauritia Febronia de La Tour d'Auvergne (1652–1706)

== Bibliography ==
- Dieter Albrecht: Maximilian I. von Bayern 1573–1651, München (Munich) 1998, ISBN 3-486-56334-3. (latest biography, which was received with great appreciation among German scholars)

Maximilian I, Elector of Bavaria House of Wittelsbach Born: 17 April 1573 Died: 27 September 1651
Regnal titles
Preceded by William V	Duke later Elector of Bavaria; 1597–1651	Succeeded by Ferdinand Maria
Preceded by Frederick V	Elector Palatine; 1623–1648	Succeeded by Charles I Louis
