= Renata of Lorraine =

Duchess of Bavaria from 1579 to 1597

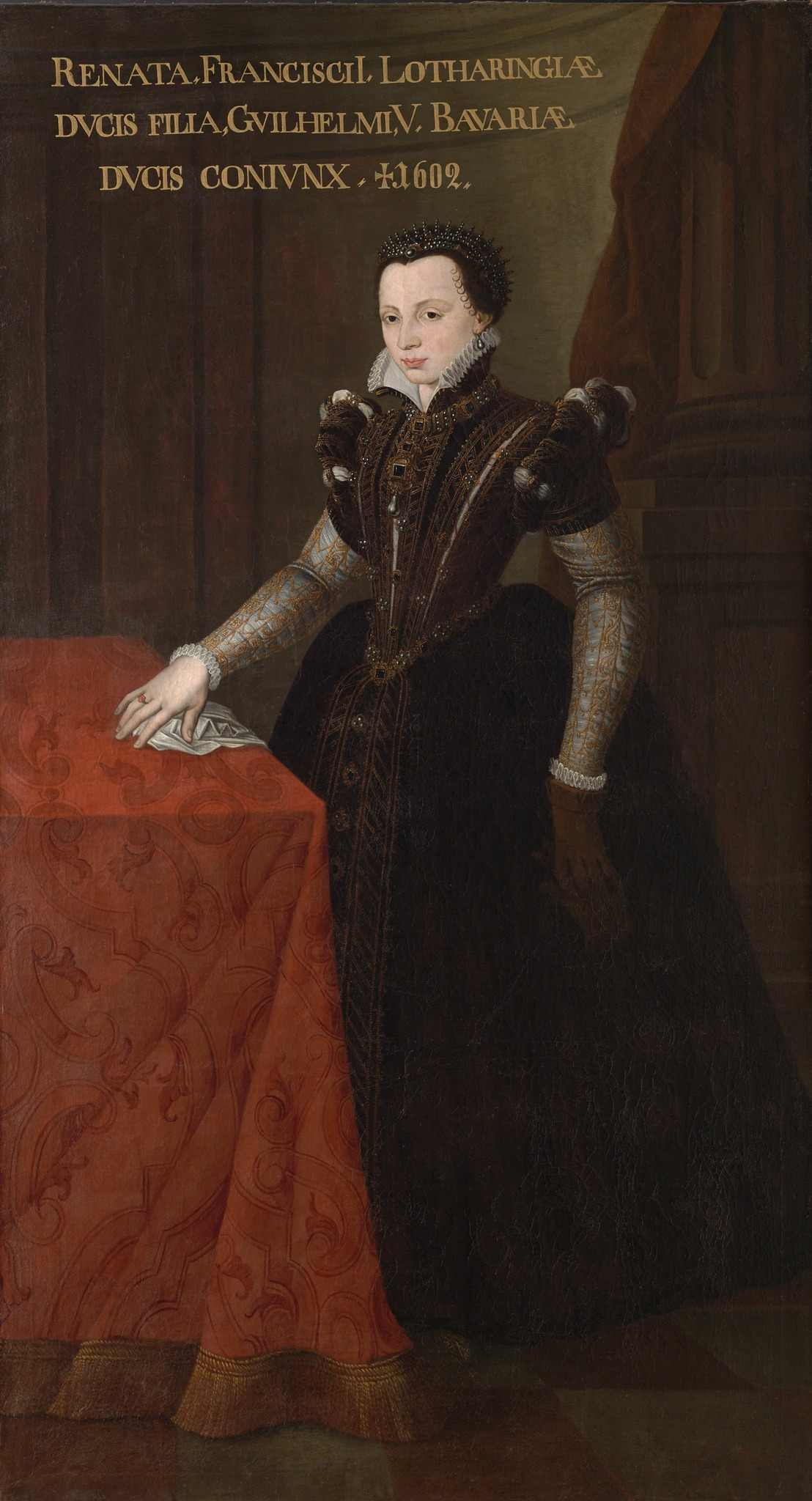
- Portrait by Hans von Aachen

Duchess consort of Bavaria
- Tenure: 24 October 1579 - 15 October 1597
- Born: Renée de Lorraine; 20 April 1544; Nancy, Duchy of Lorraine
- Died: 22 May 1602 (aged 58); Munich, Duchy of Bavaria
- Spouse: William V, Duke of Bavaria (m. 1568)
- Issue: Maximilian I, Elector of Bavaria; Maria Anna, Archduchess of Austria; Philipp William, Bishop of Regensburg; Ferdinand of Bavaria; Karl of Bavaria; Albert VI, Duke of Bavaria; Magdalene of Bavaria
- House: Lorraine
- Father: Francis I, Duke of Lorraine
- Mother: Christina of Denmark

Renata of Lorraine (French: Renée de Lorraine, German: Renata von Lothringen; 20 April 1544 – 22 May 1602) was a noblewoman of the House of Lorraine who became a Duchess of Bavaria by her marriage to Duke William V.

== Early life ==
Born in Nancy, Renata was the second child and eldest daughter of Francis I, Duke of Lorraine and Christina of Denmark.

Renata was described as a beauty and a desirable match. In 1558, after the death of his first wife Prince William of Orange expressed a desire to marry Renata. Her mother, Christina, liked the idea, and it was further cemented after the Treaty of Cateau-Cambrésis. This match was however prevented by King Philip of Spain. Christina declined the plan of Cardinal of Lorraine to arrange a marriage between Renata and the prince of Joinville, and also a match proposed by the Spanish king to marry Renata to Juan d'Austria.

In 1561, Renata's mother planned to marry her to king Frederick II of Denmark. However, the outbreak of the Nordic Seven Years' War between Denmark and Sweden in 1563, interrupted these plans. From 1565 to 1567, Christina negotiated with King Eric XIV of Sweden to create an alliance between Sweden and Denmark through his marriage to Renata. The plan was for Christina to conquer Denmark with the support of Sweden, a plan Eric supported.

However, Holy Roman Emperor Ferdinand opposed the plan due to the destructive effect it could have on the balance of power among the German nations, if Saxony (being strongly allied with Denmark) opposed Christina's claims. Neither did she manage to acquire the support of Philip of Spain. The planned marriage alliance between Lorraine and Sweden was finally ended when Eric XIV married his non-noble lover Karin Månsdotter in 1567.

== Duchess consort of Bavaria ==
Finally, on 22 February 1568, Renata married her paternal second, but maternal first cousin William, hereditary prince of Bavaria, in a large, elaborate ceremony and celebration in Munich that lasted 18 days. The event was described in detail by Massimo Troiano in his Dialoghi (1569). Approximately 5,000 riders took part in it, and the music was composed by Orlande de Lassus.

Despite their large wedding and status, Renata, along with her husband, led a life of charity and humility. They left the Munich Residenz and lived in the Jesuit Kollegienbau west of Munich. Renata cared for the sick, the poor and religious pilgrims. In this task, she was completely supported by her husband. They had ten children, but only six of them lived to adulthood.

After her husband inherited the duchy in 1579 as William V of Bavaria, Renata spent much of her time in the Herzogspitalkirche in Munich, founded in 1555 by her father-in-law. She died in Munich, aged 58. Her grave is located in the St. Michael's Church in Munich, the consecration of which was the last high point in both her and her husband's lives. She was revered as a saint by the people, but never canonized. Her husband, who abdicated in 1597, survived her by twenty-four years, dying in 1626.

== Issue ==
Renata and William had:

- Christoph (born and died 23 January 1570).
- Christine (23 September 1571 – 27 April 1580), died in childhood.
- Maximilian I (17 April 1573 – 22 September 1651), future Duke and Elector of Bavaria.
- Maria Anna (8 December 1574 – 8 March 1616), married on 23 April 1600 to Ferdinand, Archduke of Inner Austria and future Holy Roman Emperor
- Philipp Wilhelm (22 September 1576 – 18 May 1598), Bishop of Regensburg from 1595, Cardinal from 1597.
- Ferdinand (6 October 1577 – 13 September 1650), Archbishop and prince-elector of Cologne (1612–1650)
- Eleonore Magdalene (7 October 1578 – 18 April 1579), died in infancy.
- Karl (30 May 1580 – 27 October 1587), died in childhood.
- Albert VI (26 February 1584 – 5 July 1666), Landgrave of Leuchtenberg by marriage.
- Magdalene (4 July 1587 – 25 September 1628), married on 11 November 1613 married Wolfgang Wilhelm, Count Palatine of Neuburg

== Sources ==
- Thomas, Andrew L. (2010). A House Divided: Wittelsbach Confessional Court Cultures in the Holy Roman, c.1550-1650. Brill.
- van Tol, Jonas (2019). Germany and the French Wars of Religion, 1560-1572. Brill.
- Anna de Crignis-Mentelberg: Herzogin Renata. Die Mutter Maximilians des Großen von Bayern. Freiburg im Breisgau 1912.
- Helmut Dotterweich: Der junge Maximilian. Jugend und Erziehung des bayerischen Herzogs und späteren Kurfürsten Maximilian I. von 1573 bis 1593. München 1962.
- Andrea Rueth: Renata von Lothringen, Herzogin von Bayern. In: Wurst, Jürgen und Langheiter, Alexander (Hrsg.): Monachia. München: Städtische Galerie im Lenbachhaus, 2005. p. 142.

Renata of Lorraine House of Lorraine Born: 20 April 1544 Died: 22 May 1602
Royal titles
Preceded by Anna of Austria	Duchess consort of Bavaria; 1579–1597	Succeeded by Elisabeth of Lorraine
