= William V of Bavaria =

Duke of Bavaria from 1579 to 1597

William V
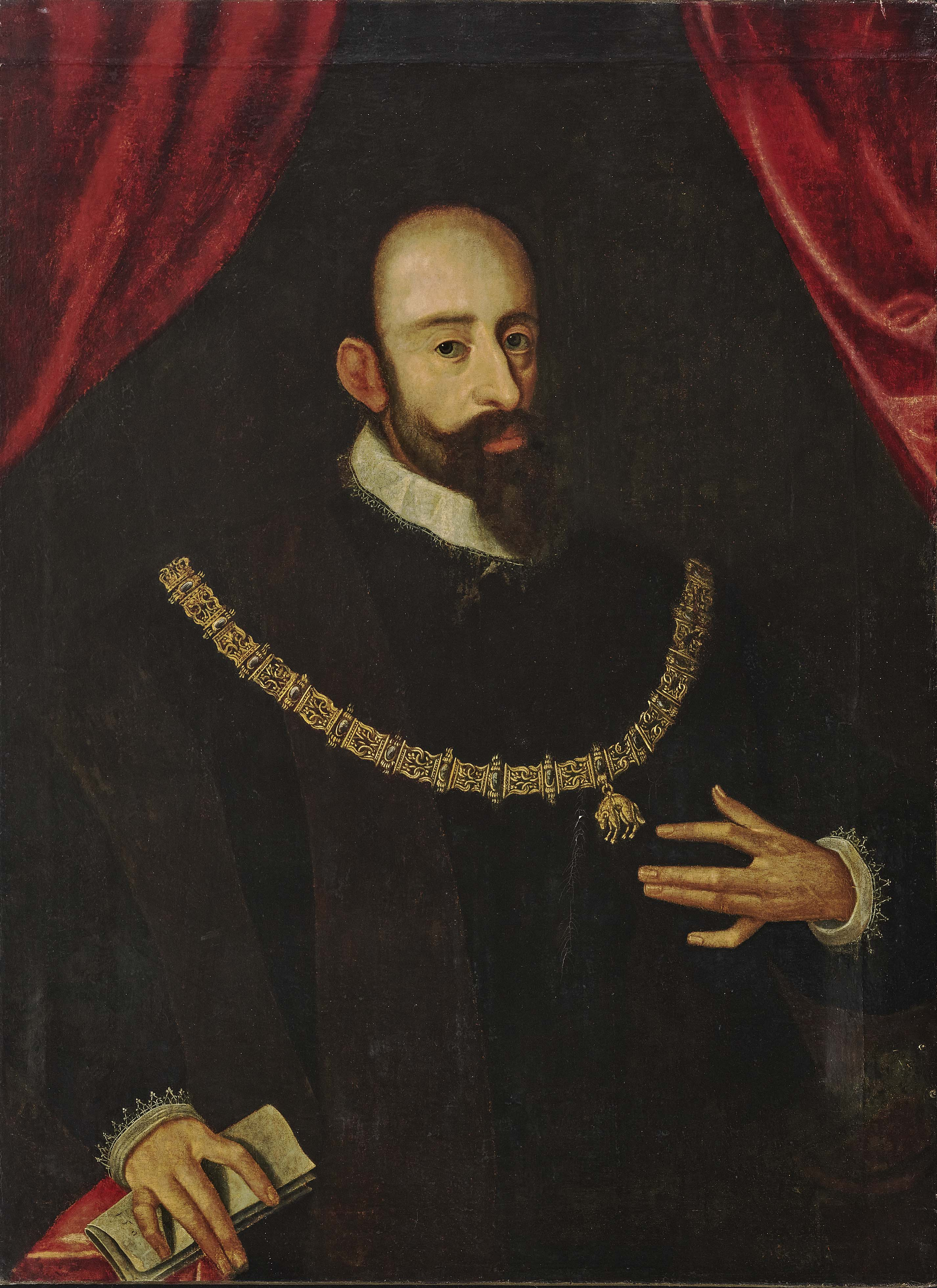
- William V of Bavaria wearing the insignia of the Order of the Golden Fleece

Duke of Bavaria
- Reign: 24 October 1579 – 15 October 1597 (abdication)
- Predecessor: Albert V
- Successor: Maximilian I
- Born: 29 September 1548; Landshut, Duchy of Bavaria
- Died: 7 February 1626 (aged 77); Schleissheim Palace
- Burial: St. Michael's Church, Munich
- Spouse: Renata of Lorraine (m. 1568; died 1602)
- Issue more...: Maximilian I, Elector of Bavaria; Maria Anna, Archduchess of Inner Austria; Philipp William, Bishop of Regensburg; Ferdinand of Bavaria; Albert VI of Bavaria; Magdalene, Countess Palatine of Neuburg
- House: Wittelsbach
- Father: Albert V, Duke of Bavaria
- Mother: Anna of Austria
- Religion: Roman Catholicism

William V (29 September 1548 – 7 February 1626), called the Pious, (German: Wilhelm V., der Fromme, Herzog von Bayern) was the duke of Bavaria from 1579 to 1597.

== Education and early life ==
William V was born in Landshut, the son of Albert V and Archduchess Anna of Austria.

He received a Jesuit education and showed keen attachment to the Jesuit Counter Reformation tenets. His title 'the Pious' was given to him because he devoted his daily routine to Masses (when possible, several times a day), prayer, contemplation, and devotional reading. He took part in public devotions, processions, and pilgrimages.

William V's residence as crown prince was the ancient fortified Wittelsbach seat Trausnitz Castle, which he renovated extensively between 1568 and 1578. His projects, including the construction of an arcaded inner court, changed the Gothic castle into a Renaissance palace complex.

== Reign ==
Like his Wittelsbach father and grandfather, William V was a strong supporter of the Counter-Reformation. He secured the archbishopric of Cologne for his brother Ernest with his campaign in 1583; his brother Ferdinand commanded the Bavarian army in the first 18 months of the Cologne War in an effort to secure the Electorate. Eventually, the Spanish army, under the command of Alexander Farnese, Duke of Parma expelled the Calvinist contender for the Electorate, Gebhard Truchsess von Waldburg, and Ernst secured sole possession of both the Electorate and the Archdiocese of Cologne. This dignity remained in the possession of the family for nearly 200 years. Two of William V's sons also followed ecclesiastical careers: Philipp Wilhelm of Bavaria became the Bishop of Regensburg and eventually a Cardinal, and Ferdinand of Bavaria succeeded his uncle as Archbishop of Cologne. In 1591, Philipp Wilhelm expelled Salzburg from the Berchtesgaden Provostry, the future possession of his son Ferdinand.

During William V's reign, non-Catholics were forced to leave Bavaria, and the so-called Geistlicher Rat, an ecclesiastical council, was formed to advise William V on theological affairs, independent of the traditional privy council or the treasury, which administered secular affairs. The Geistlicher Rat supervised and disciplined the duchy's Catholic clergy through regular visitations; it controlled the Catholicism of all the state officials by issuing certificates documenting their annual confession and communion; it funded new Catholic schools, new Catholic colleges, new houses of religious orders, especially the missionary and educational ones, such as the Jesuits and Capuchins for men and the Ursulines for women. William V is responsible for numerous executions due to witch-hunts in his duchy.

In 1582 William V gifted a Trumpeter Automaton with five trumpeters and one drummer to the Habsburg Archduke of Tyrol Ferdinand II (1529-1595). The Automaton was crafted in the Free Imperial City of Augsburg by the jeweler Valentin Drausch and the clockmaker Hans Schlottheim.

The Jesuit St. Michael's Church and college of the Jesuits were built in Munich between 1583 and 1597 as spiritual centers for the counter-reformation. William V's spending on Church-related projects, including funding missionaries outside Bavaria—as far away as Asia and the Americas—put tremendous strain on the Bavarian treasury. The Venetian confidence man Marco Bragadino who was promising to make copious amounts of gold to erase the Dukes's debts was called upon by William V in 1590, and executed after he had failed. William V abdicated on 15 October 1597 in favour of his son, Maximilian I and retired into a monastery where he spent the remainder of his life in contemplation and prayer. He died in 1626 at the Old Schleissheim Palace and was buried at St. Michael's Church, Munich.

== Cultural activity ==
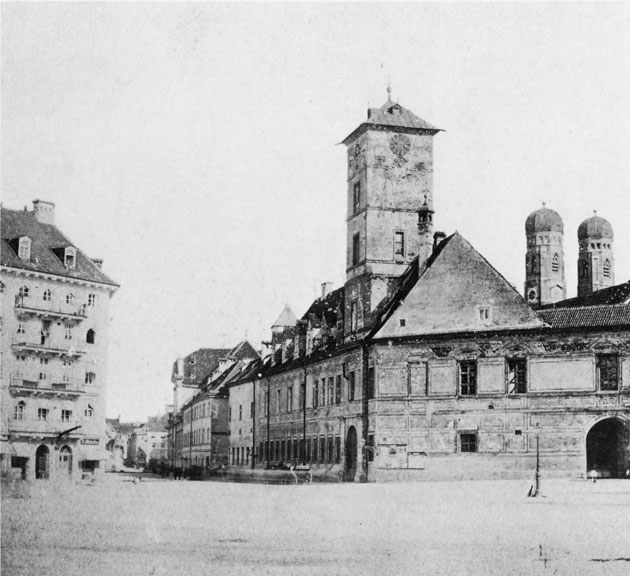
Wilhelminische Veste (1860)

Already as crown prince in Landshut, William V patronised the arts. His court architect Friedrich Sustris was in charge of the decoration and remodelling of Trausnitz Castle in Landshut. Later when he ascended to rule, Sustris also undertook the expansion of the Munich Residenz, the construction of the adjoining college, the palace Wilhelminische Veste (the so-called Maxburg) in Munich, and St. Michael's Church.

In 1589, William V built the Hofbräu Brewery.

The Old Schleissheim Palace was founded by William V in 1598 as a renaissance country house and hermitage located close to Dachau Palace. The sculptors Hans Krumpper and Hubert Gerhard along with painters Peter Candid and Hans von Aachen were engaged at his court.

== Family and children ==
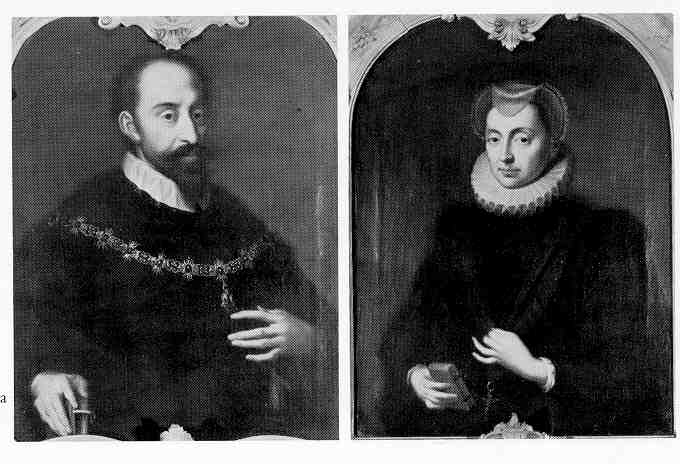
William V, Duke of Bavaria and his wife, Renata of Lorraine

Married Renata of Lorraine (1544–1602) in Munich on 22 February 1568. They had:

- Christoph (born and died 23 January 1570).
- Christine (23 September 1571 – 27 April 1580), died in childhood.
- Maximilian I (1573–1651), future Duke and Elector of Bavaria
- Maria Anna of Bavaria (Maria Anna v. Bayern), 1574–1616, married Ferdinand II, Holy Roman Emperor in 1600
- Philipp Wilhelm (22 September 1576 – 18 May 1598), Bishop of Regensburg from 1595, Cardinal from 1597
- Ferdinand (6 October 1577 – 13 September 1650), Archbishop and prince-elector of Cologne (1612–1650)
- Eleonore Magdalene (7 October 1578 – 18 April 1579), died in infancy.
- Karl (30 May 1580 – 27 October 1587), died in childhood.
- Albert VI (1584–1666), in 1612 married Mechthilde v. Leuchtenberg (1588–1634)
- Magdalene of Bavaria (4 July 1587 – 25 September 1628), married in 1613, Wolfgang Wilhelm, Pfalzgraf von Neuburg (1578–1663)

== Sources ==
- Keating, Jessica (2018). Animating Empire: Automata, the Holy Roman Empire, and the Early Modern World. Penn State University Press. ISBN 9780271081519.
- Thomas, Andrew L. (2010). A House Divided: Wittelsbach Confessional Court Cultures in the Holy Roman, c.1550-1650. Brill.

William V of Bavaria House of Wittelsbach Born: 29 September 1548 Died: 7 February 1626
Regnal titles
Preceded by Albert V	Duke of Bavaria; 1579–1597	Succeeded by Maximilian I
