= St. Martin's Church, Landshut =

St Martin's Church
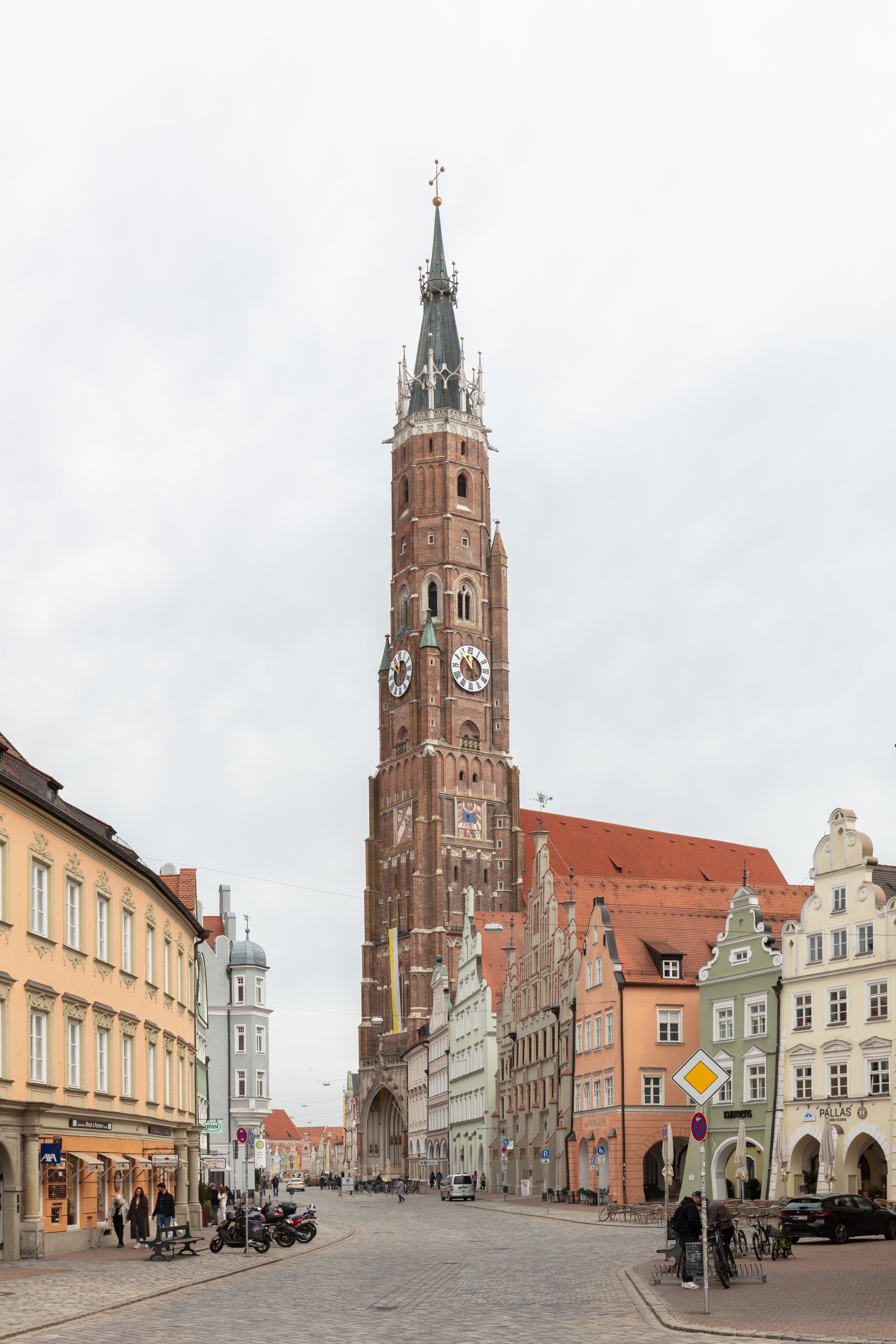
- St Martin's Church
- St Martin's Church
- 48°32′03″N 12°09′04″E
- Location: Landshut, Bavaria
- Country: Germany
- Denomination: Roman Catholic

History
- Status: Church
- Founded: 1389^{1}
- Dedication: Saint Martin

Architecture
- Designated: 1500
- Architectural type: Church
- Style: Gothic
- Completed: 1500^{1}

Specifications
- Height: 130.6 m (428 ft 6 in)^{1}
- Materials: Brick

The Church of St. Martin is a medieval church in Landshut, Bavaria. St. Martin's Church, along with Trausnitz Castle and the celebration of the Landshuter Hochzeit (wedding), are the most important landmarks and historical events of Landshut. The Brick Gothic building features Bavaria's tallest church tower, and this steeple is also the 2nd tallest brick structure in the world (after Anaconda Smelter Stack) made without steel supports. St. Martin's church's bell tower has a height of 130.6 metres (428 ft), which makes it one of the tallest churches in the world.^{1}

== History ==
In the year 1204, the town of Landshut was founded by Duke Louis I, Duke of Bavaria the Kelheimer. He established Castle Trausnitz and built a small church on the site of the present-day St. Martin's Church. That structure was superseded by building the existing church, which began in 1389.^{1} It took about 110 years to finish the church. During this period, five architects managed the building site. It took 55 years just to build the tower. The church was finally dedicated in 1500.^{1}

== Features ==
The choir elbow cross of 1495 has an overall length of 8 m (22 feet). The crucifix is one of the largest of the late Gothic period. The body was carved from a lime tree trunk and has a length of 5.80 m (16 feet) and an arm width of 5.40 m (15 feet). Sculpted by Michel Erhart, it was installed in 1495.

Other important works of art in the church include the high altar, the hexagonal pulpit carved from a single stone, and the "rose wreath/ring Madonna" (about 1520), created by Hans Leinberger and considered one of his most important works of art.

== Construction and renovations ==
Construction of the church began around 1389, under the architect Hans von Burghausen. The exact date for the beginning of construction of the church is not well known, but its construction was first noted in the city chronicle in 1392. The building was completed in 1500.

The church was built from brick and mortar. Five thousand wooden stakes were used for the foundation. The stakes are located completely in the groundwater, in order to delay rot caused by bacteria.

With a height of 130.6 m (428 feet), the church tower is considered to be the tallest brick building in the world, surpassing the Church of Our Lady, Bruges, in Belgium by 8.6 meters. In the year 2001, St. Martin's Church received the title of basilica minor from the Pope.

The church is built in Gothic style, demonstrated by the pointed shape of its windows and arches.

== Gallery ==
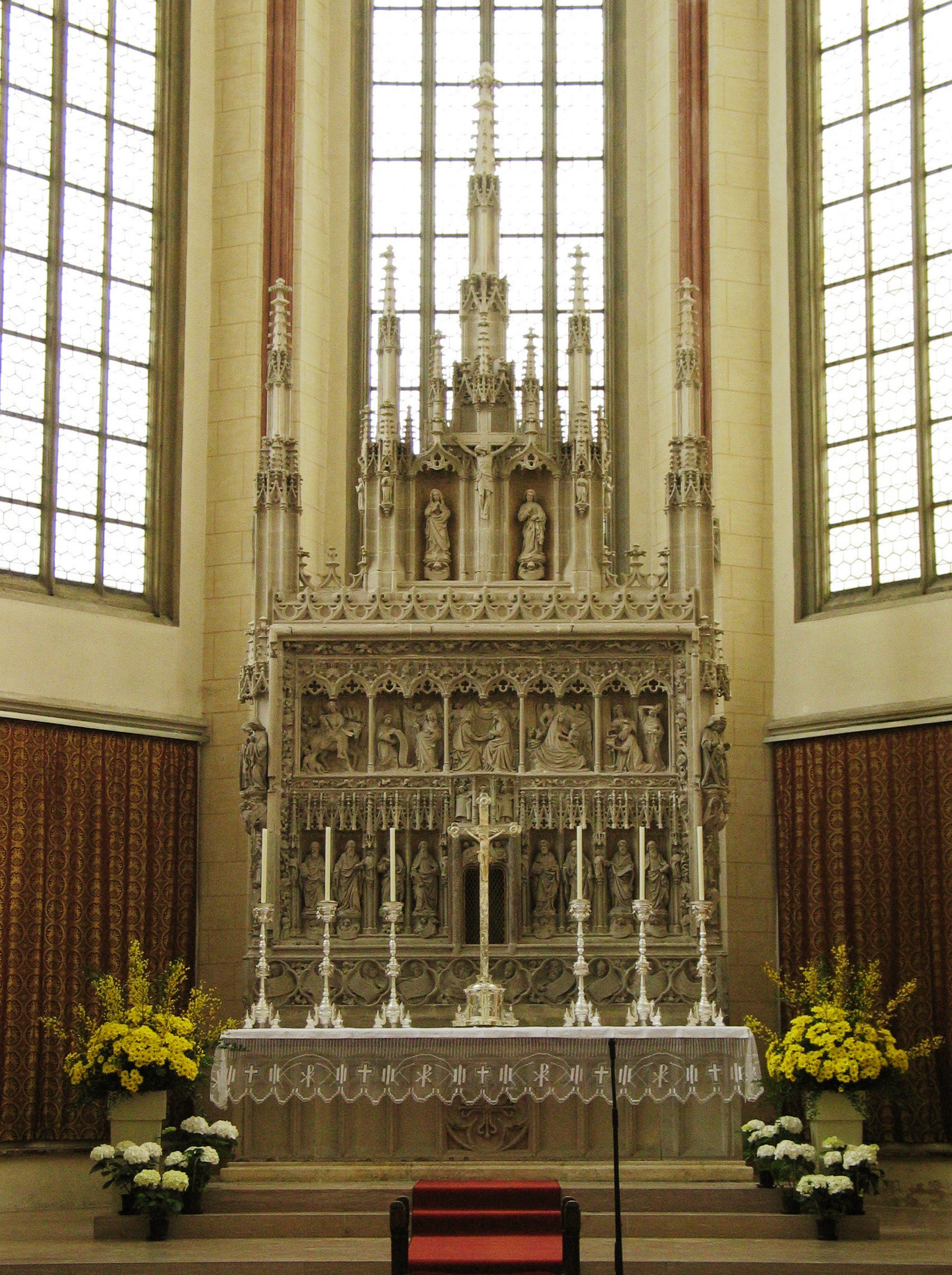
the main altar

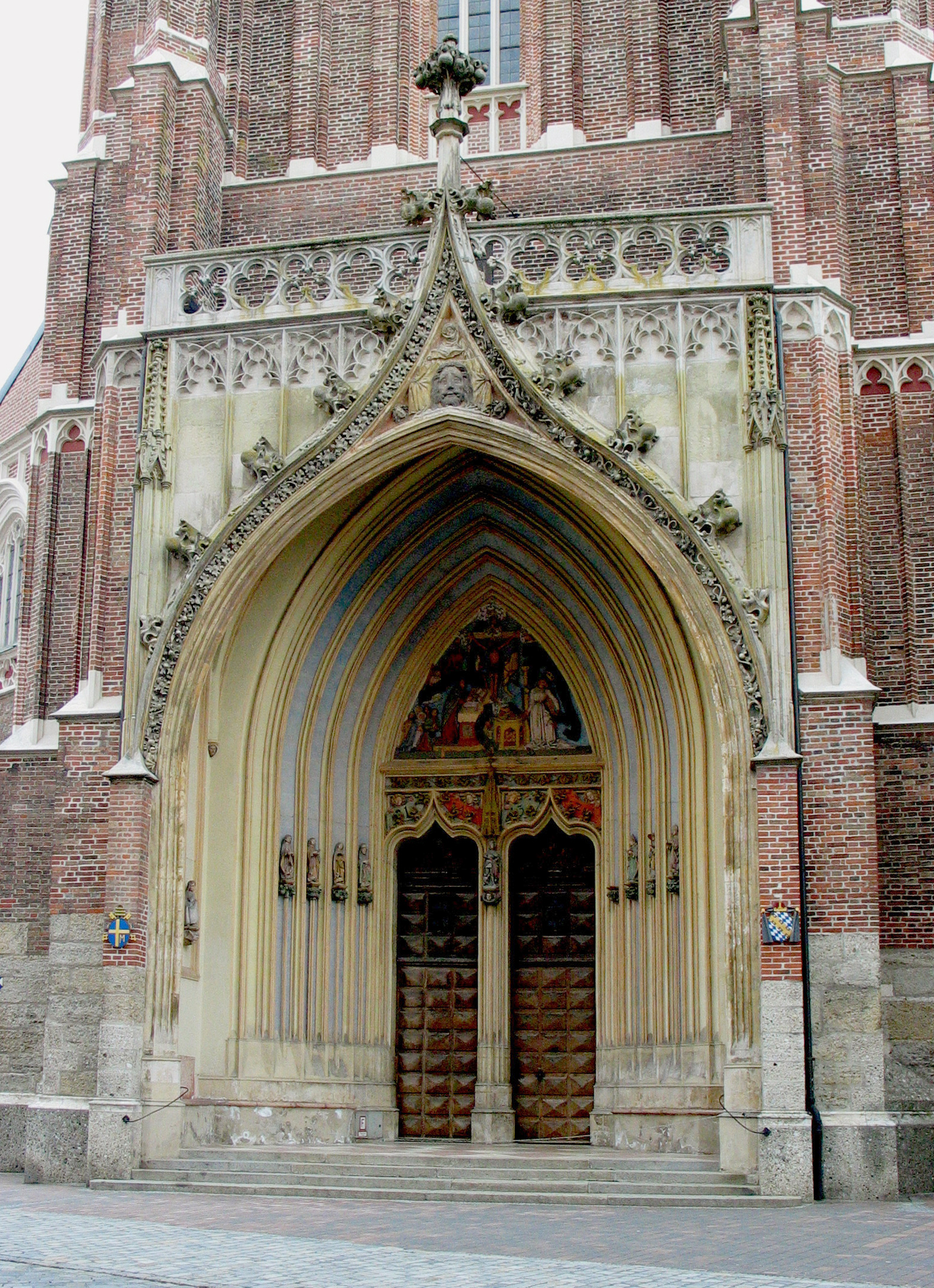
the west gate

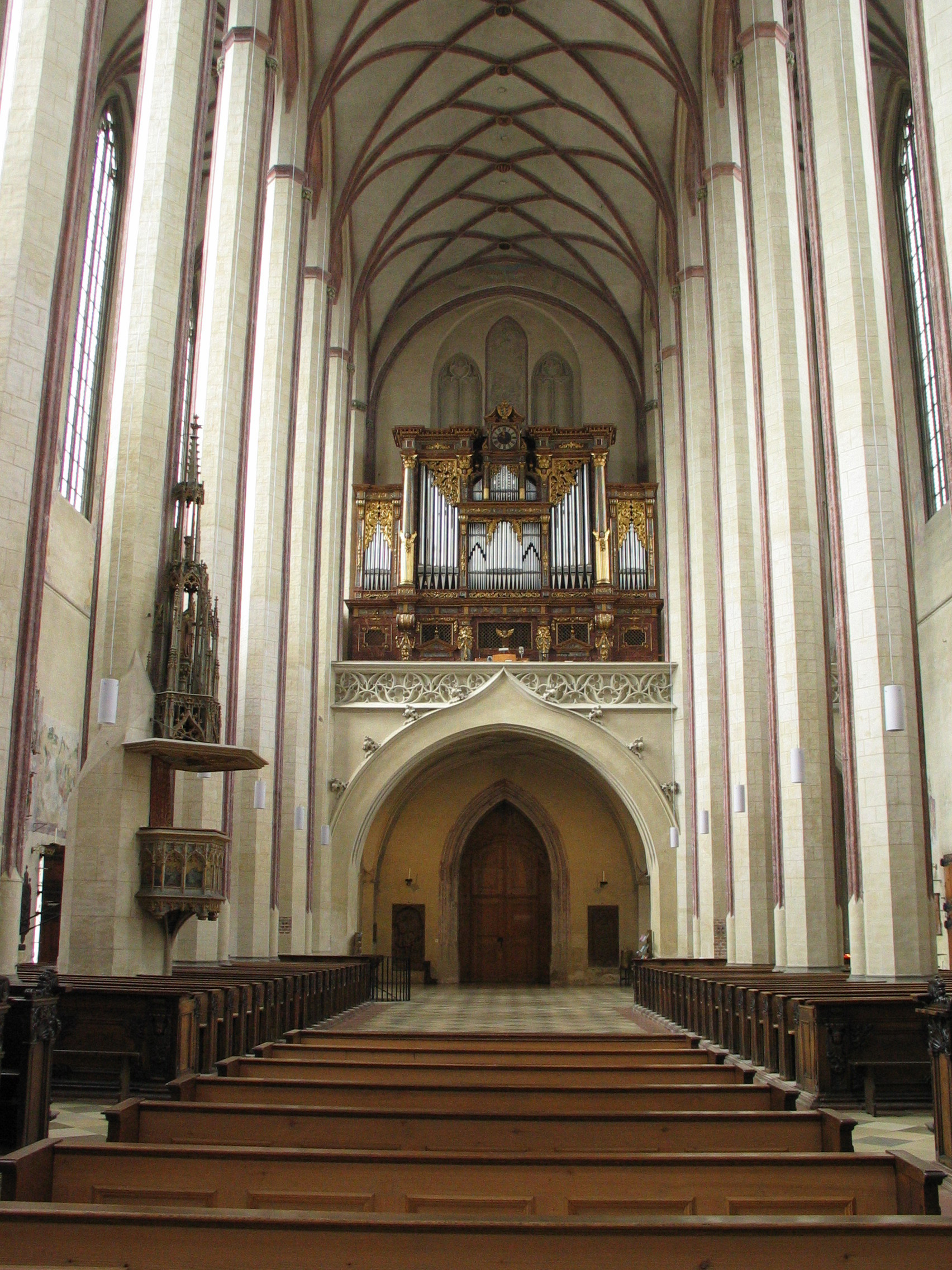
View of the organ

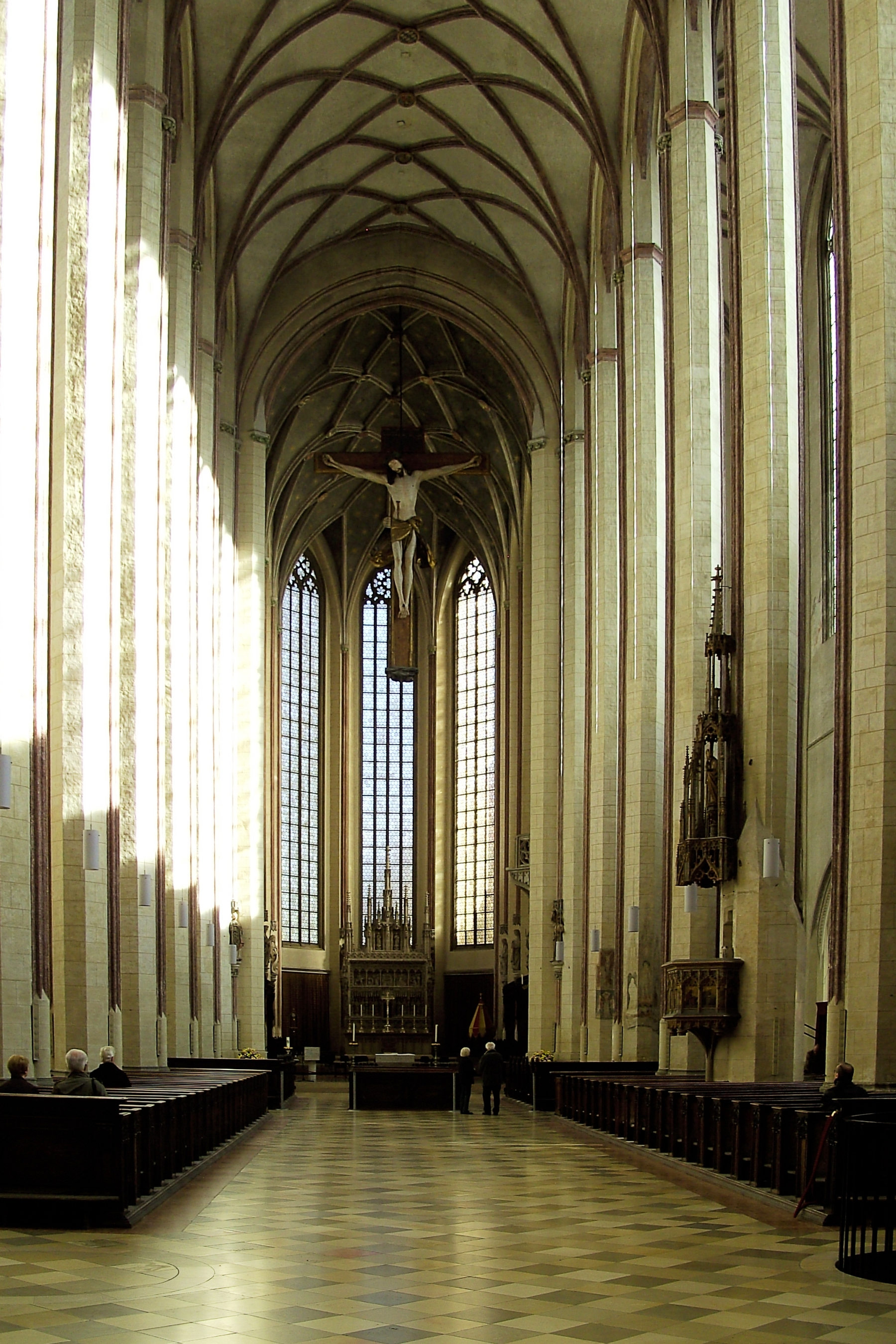
View of the choir

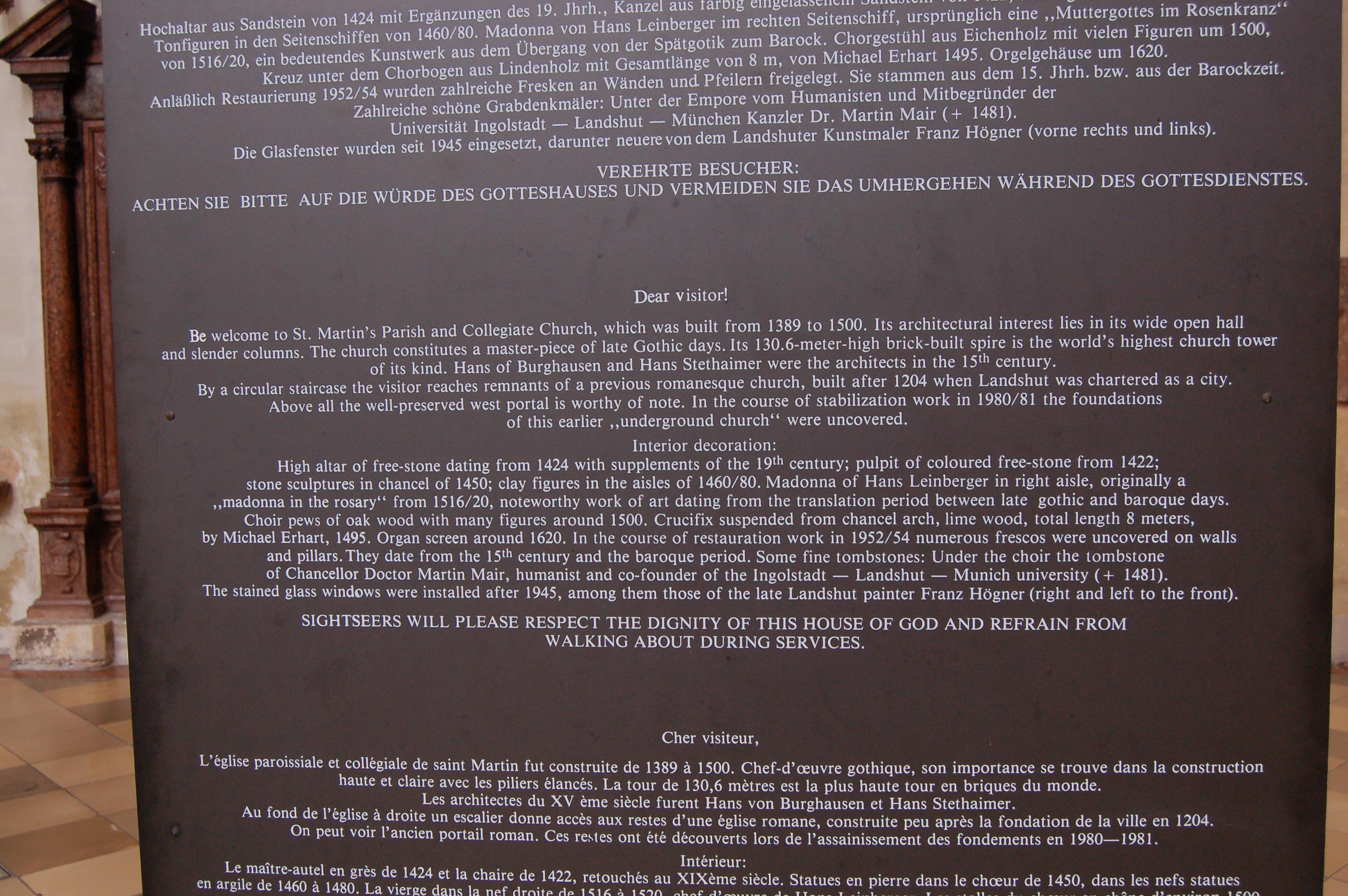
Official information about the church

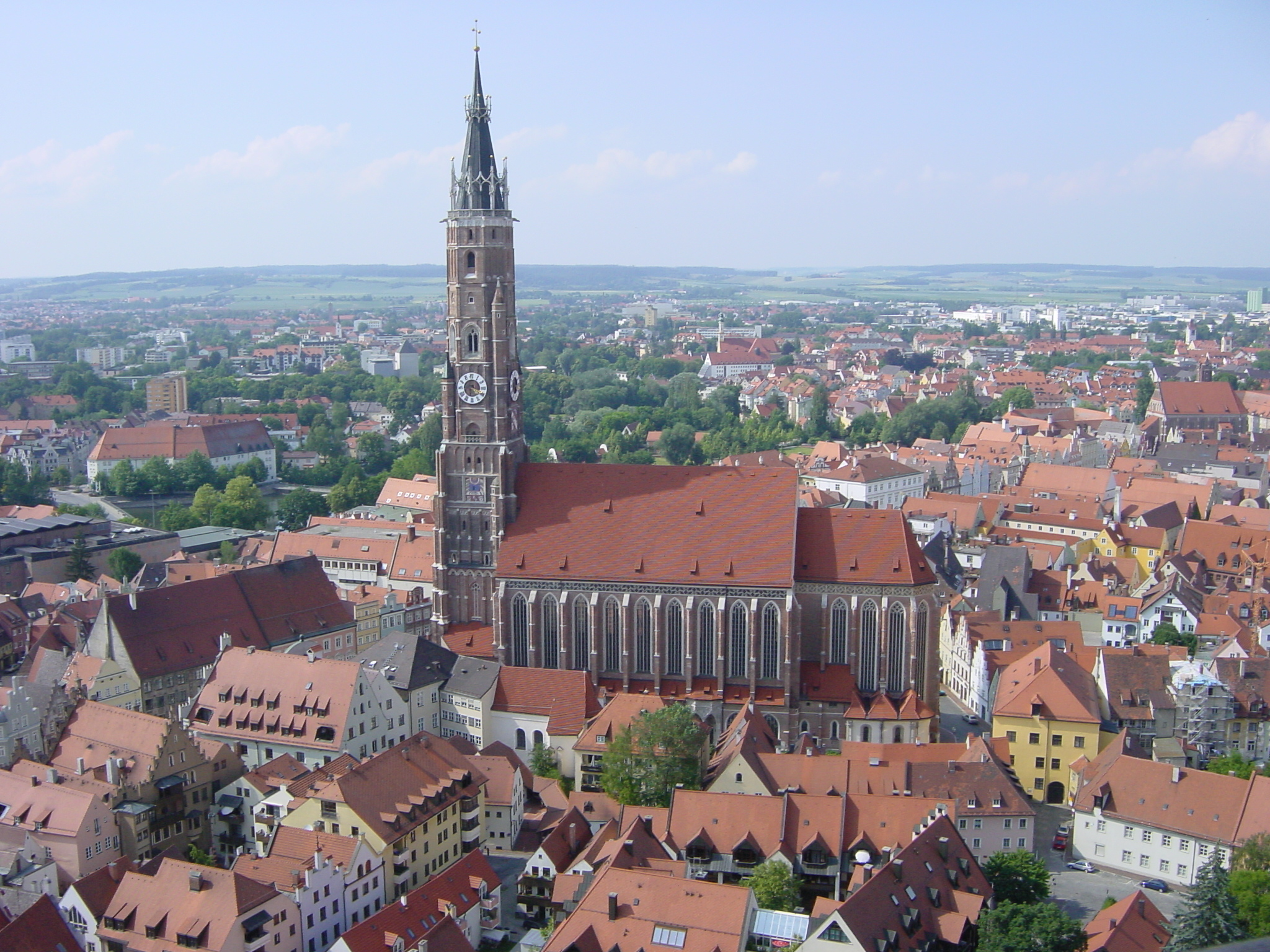
neighborhood of the building

== See also ==
- List of tallest structures built before the 20th century

== References and notes ==
- The SkyscraperPage's source showed that St. Martin's Church is 133.0 m (436 ft) tall, and construction began in 1385 and finished in 1507.
