= Landshut =

- Town
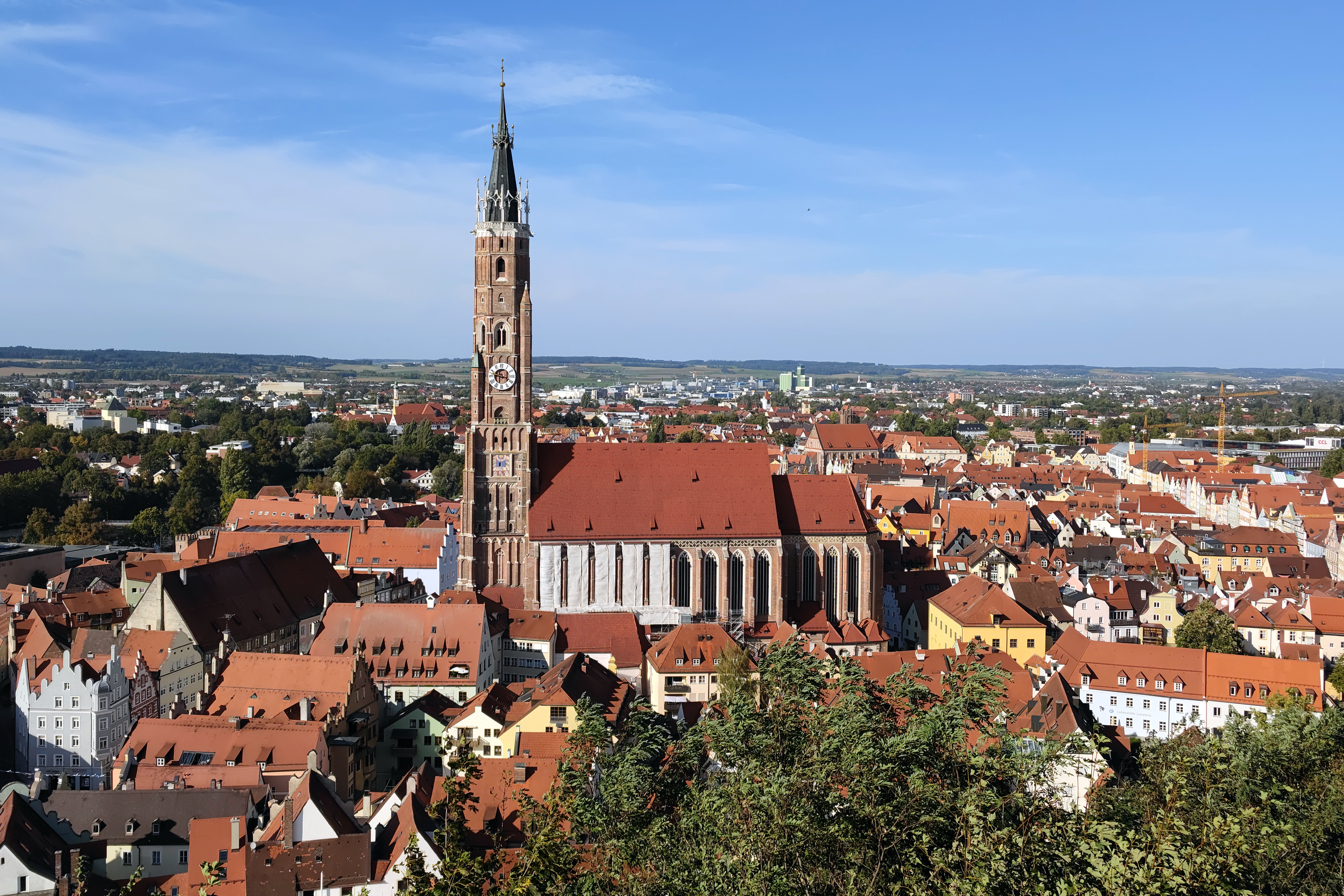
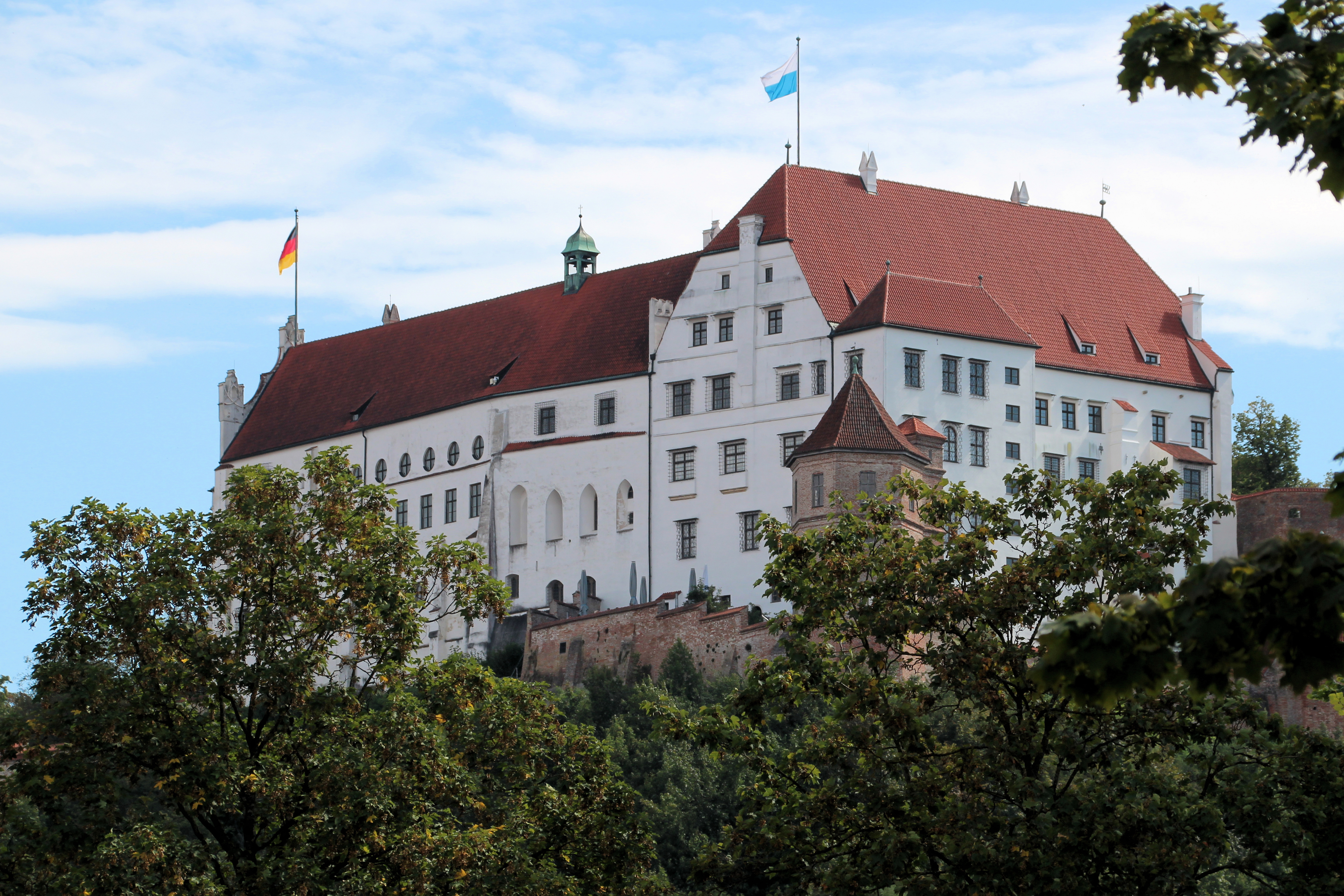
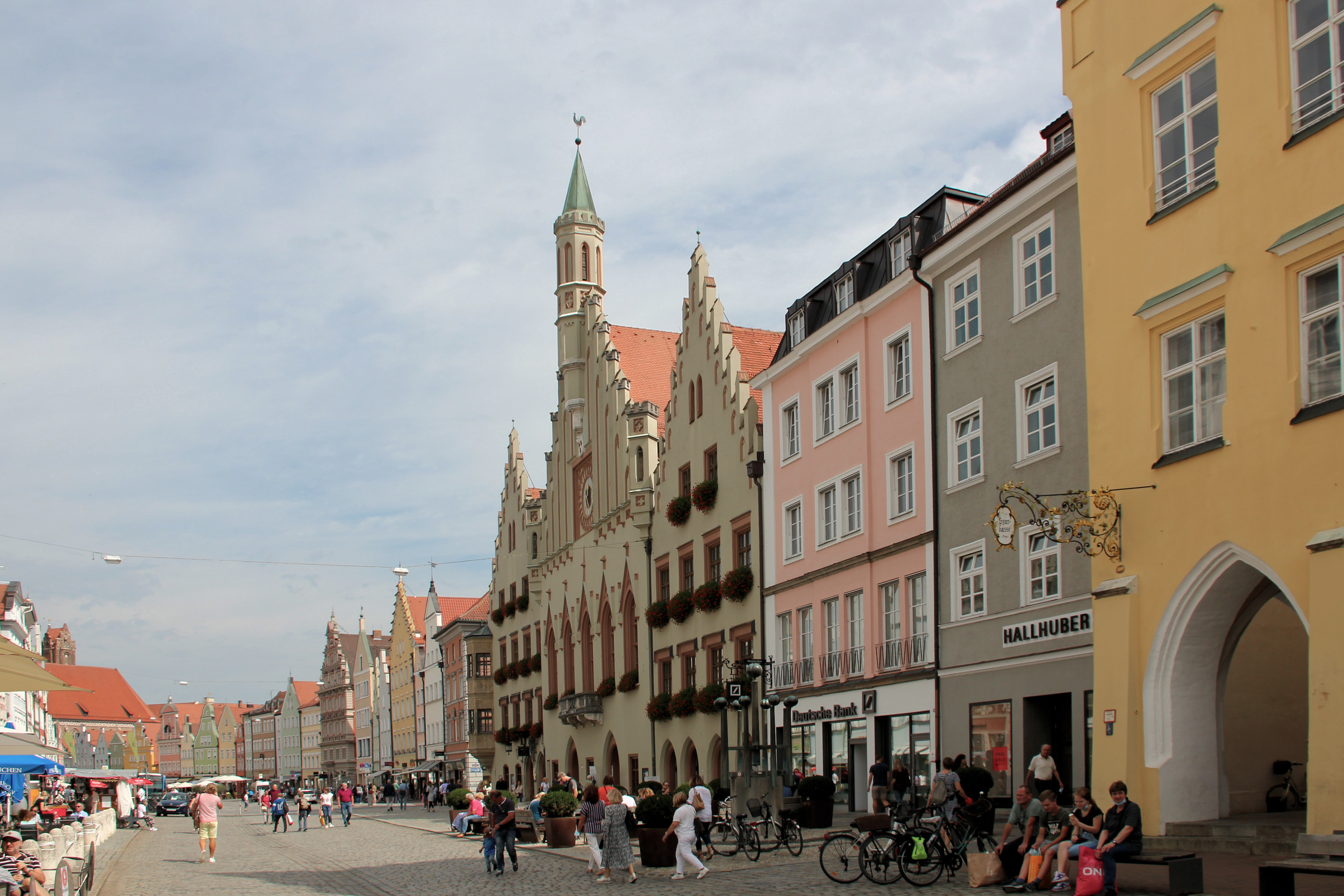
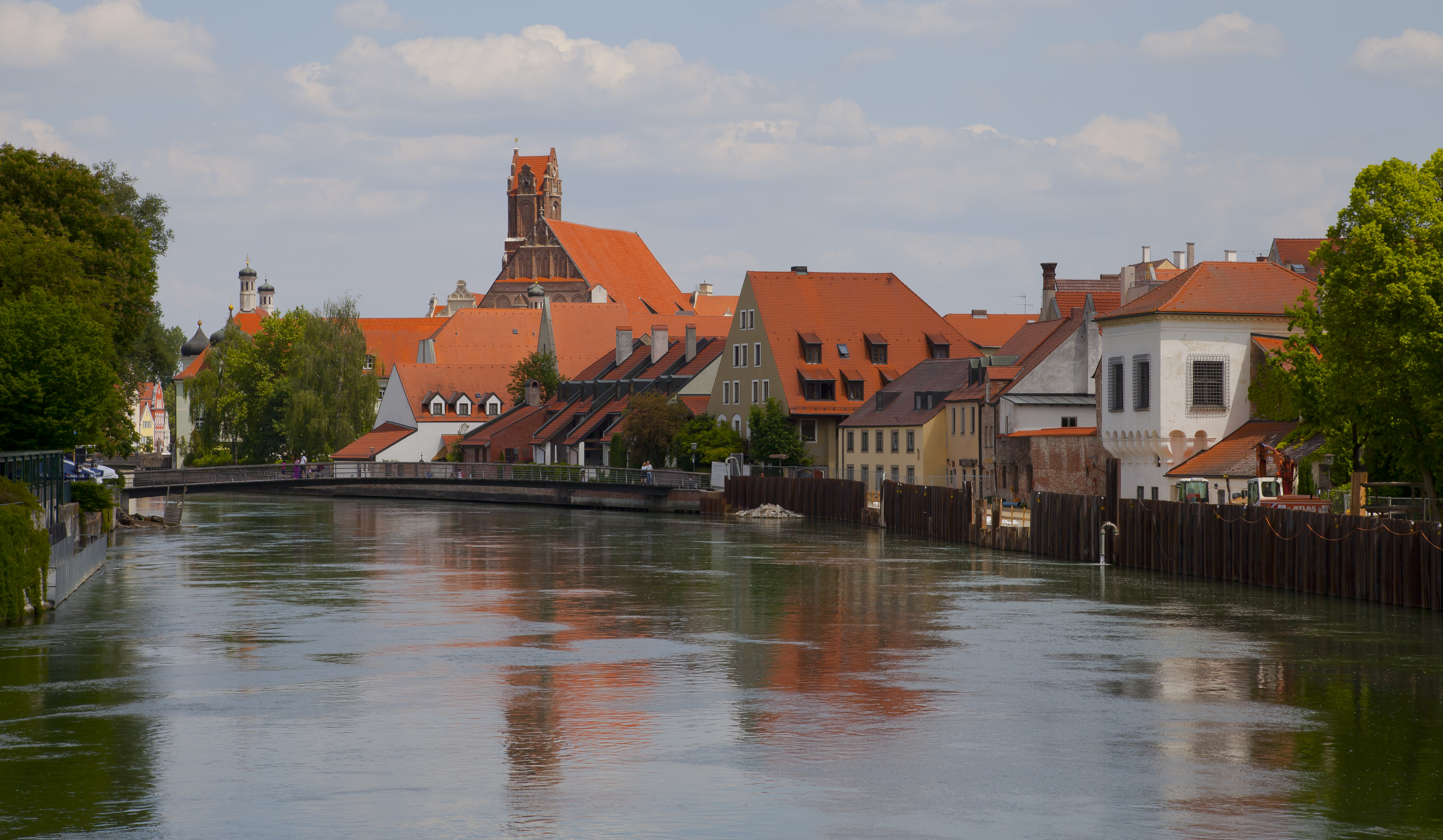
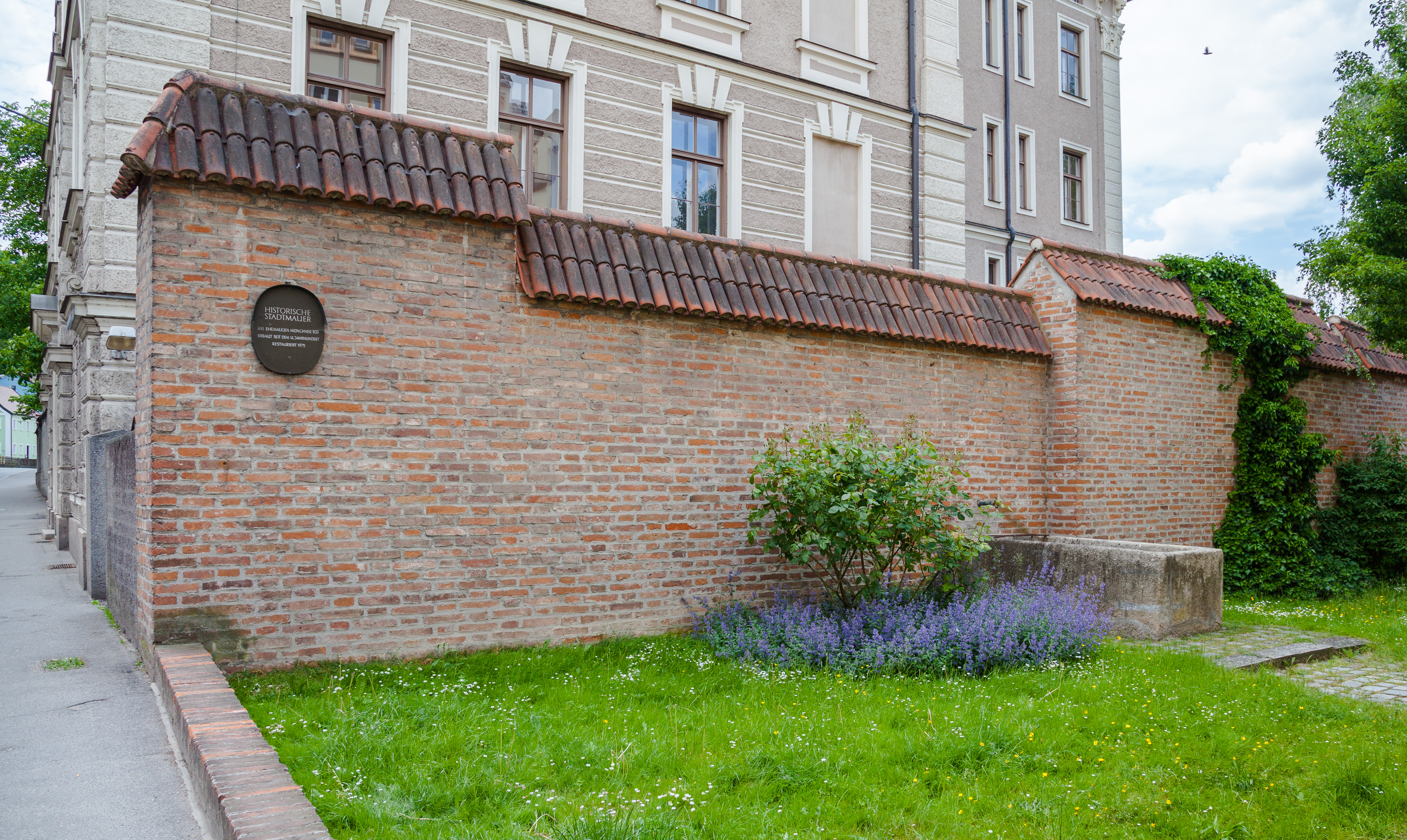
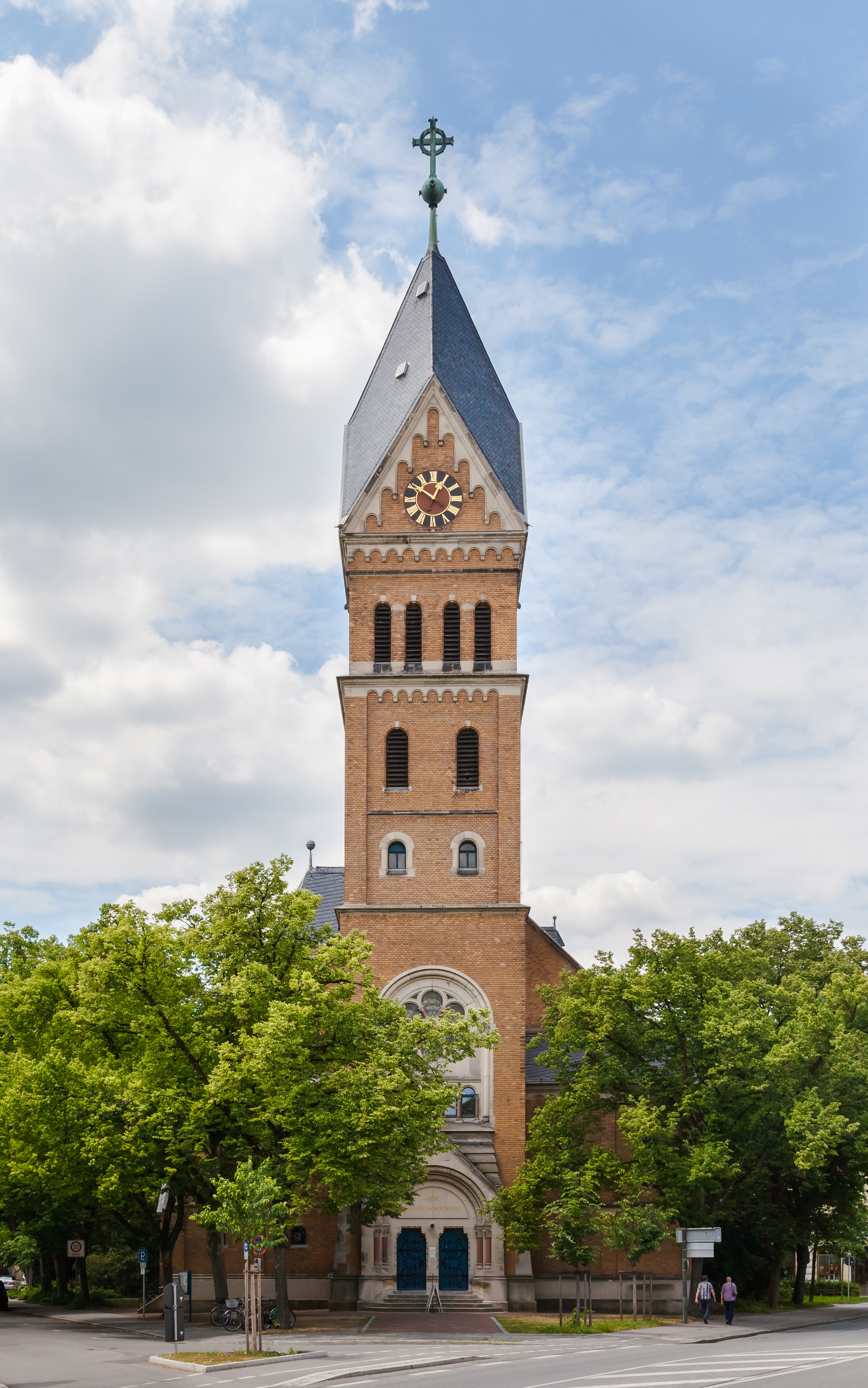
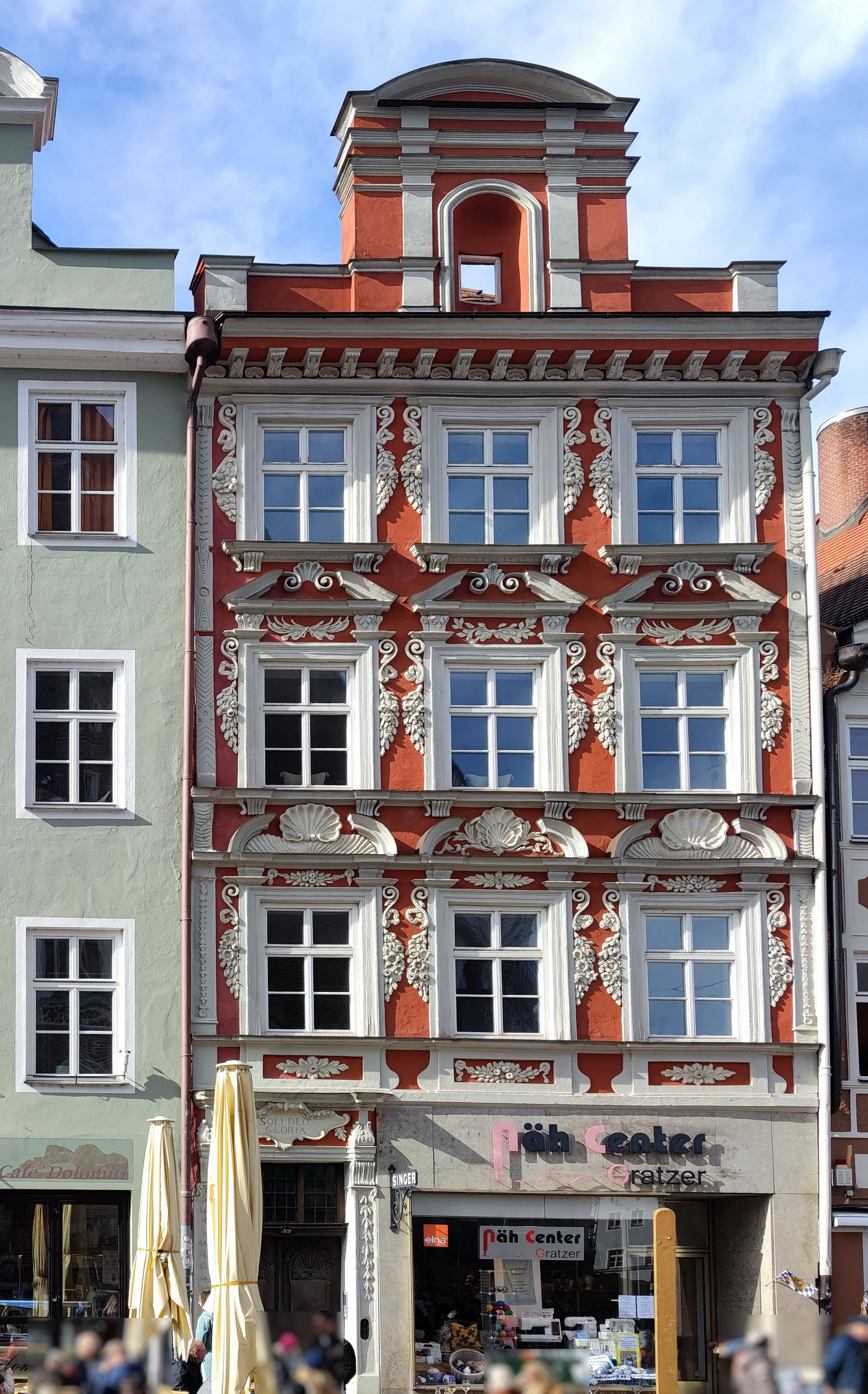
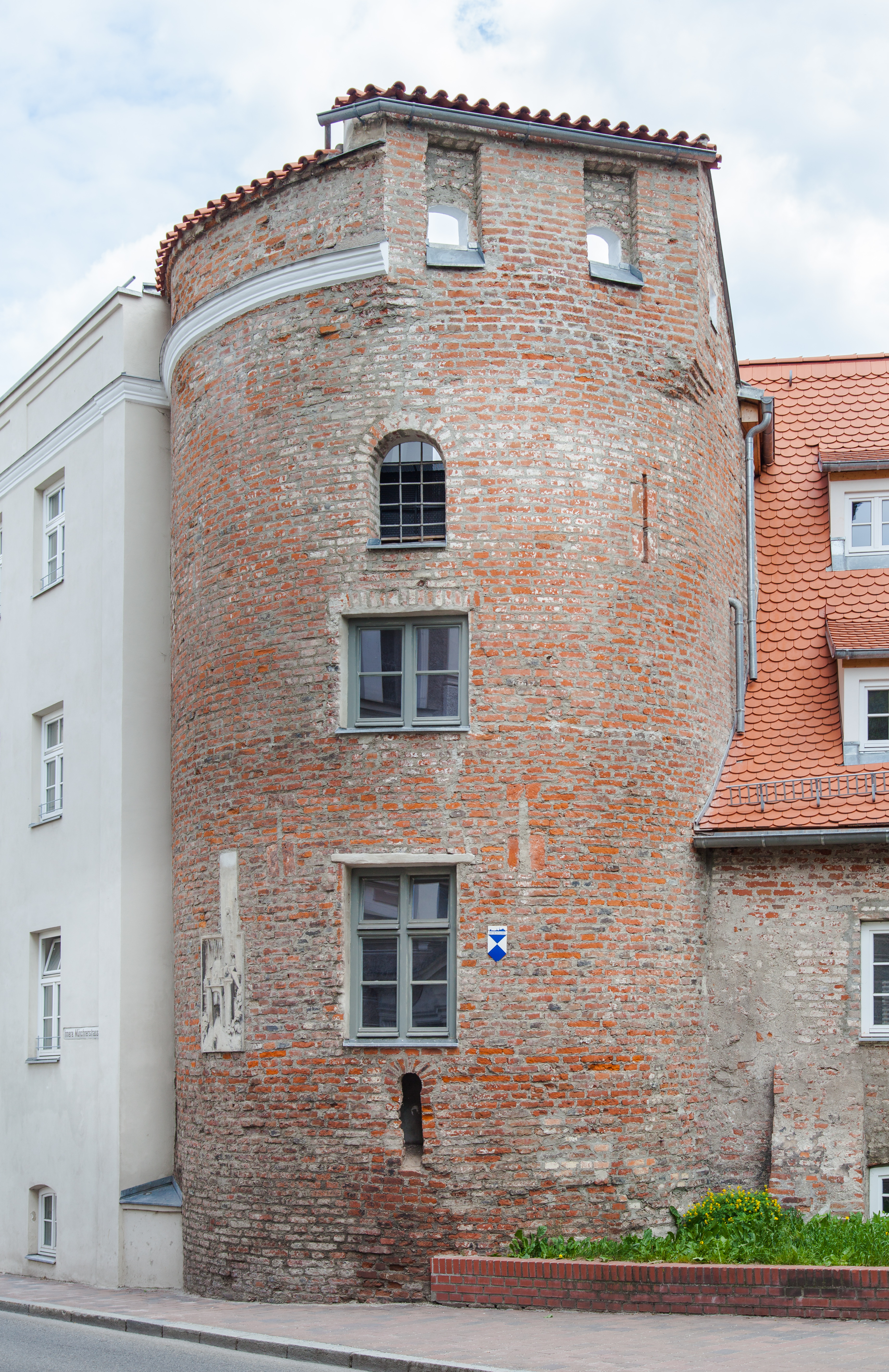
- Landshut sights with St. Martin's Church and Trausnitz Castle

- Flag Coat of arms
- Interactive map of Landshut
- Location within Germany Location within Bavaria
- Coordinates: 48°32′23″N 12°09′03″E
- Country: Germany
- State: Bavaria
- Admin. region: Lower Bavaria
- District: Urban district
- Founded: 1204

Government
  - Mayor (2026–32): Thomas Haslinger (CSU)

Area
  - Total: 65.7 km^{2} (25.4 sq mi)
- Elevation: 445 m (1,460 ft)

Population (2025-12-31)
  - Total: 71,922
  - Density: 1,090/km^{2} (2,840/sq mi)
- Time zone: UTC+01:00 (CET)
  - Summer (DST): UTC+02:00 (CEST)
- Postal codes: 84001-84036
- Dialling codes: 0871
- Vehicle registration: LA
- Website: www.landshut.de

Landshut (German: [ˈlantshuːt]; Bavarian: Landshuad) is a town in Bavaria, Germany, on the banks of the River Isar. Landshut is the capital of Lower Bavaria, one of the seven administrative regions of the Free State of Bavaria, and the seat of the surrounding district. With a population of more than 75,000, Landshut is the largest city in Lower Bavaria.

== Geography ==
Landshut lies in the Alpine foothills. The River Isar runs through the city and splits in two in the city centre. Most of the built-up area lies on the flat terraced deposits of the river. The Isar divides the town into three areas: the northern part above the river belongs to the Isar-Danube hill country, the Mühleninsel in the city centre lies between both arms of the Isar, and the southern part below the river belongs to the Isar-Inn hill country. The southern part of the town is delimited by a chain of hills, some of which rise steeply, of which the Hofberg, where the Trausnitz Castle is located, forms the highest point in the city area at a height of 505 meters above sea level.

Landshut is situated between Munich (70 kilometers southwest) and Regensburg (70 kilometers to the north). Other nearby towns are Straubing (75 km northeast), Deggendorf (75 km to the east), and Passau at the German-Austrian border (120 km to the east). The town's spread is limited to the north by Ergolding, to the northwest by Altdorf, and to the south by Kumhausen. The three smaller towns join Landshut to form a built-up area of around 100,000 people but are not incorporated into Landshut proper.

== History ==
The town and Trausnitz Castle were founded in 1204 by Duke Louis I, when a settlement developed around the castle. Landshut was a Wittelsbach residence by 1231, and in 1255, when the duchy of Bavaria was split in two, Landshut also became the capital of Lower Bavaria. Duke Henry XVI was the first of the three 'rich dukes' who ruled Bayern-Landshut in the 15th century. The wedding of Duke George with the Polish Princess Royal Jadwiga Jagiellon in 1475 was celebrated in Landshut with one of the most splendid festivals of the Middle Ages (Landshut Wedding). After his death and the Landshut War of Succession, Bavaria-Landshut was reunited with Bavaria-Munich.

Between 1537 and 1543, after his visit to Italy, Louis X, Duke of Bavaria built the Landshut Residence, the first Renaissance palace constructed north of the Alps. It was modeled after Palazzo Te in Mantua. William V, Duke of Bavaria ordered to upgrade Trausnitz Castle from a gothic fortification into a Renaissance complex when he lived in Landshut as crown prince for ten years until 1579. Afterwards, Landshut lost most of its importance until the University of Ingolstadt was moved to Landshut in 1800. However, in 1826 the university was transferred to Munich.

During the Thirty Years' War, the city was thrice (1632, 1634 and 1648) taken and plundered by Swedish forces.

Napoleon fought and won the Battle of Landshut in 1809 against an Austrian army as part of the War of the Fifth Coalition.

During World War I, a prisoner of war camp existed in Landshut. American ace James Norman Hall spent his captivity at the camp.

During World War II, a subcamp of Dachau concentration camp was located in the city to provide slave labour for local industry. The city was taken by US troops on 29 April 1945.

The U.S. Army maintained facilities in Landshut, including Pinder Kaserne and a dependent housing area, until 1986.

Since the opening of Munich Airport close to Landshut in 1992, the town has become an attractive business location.

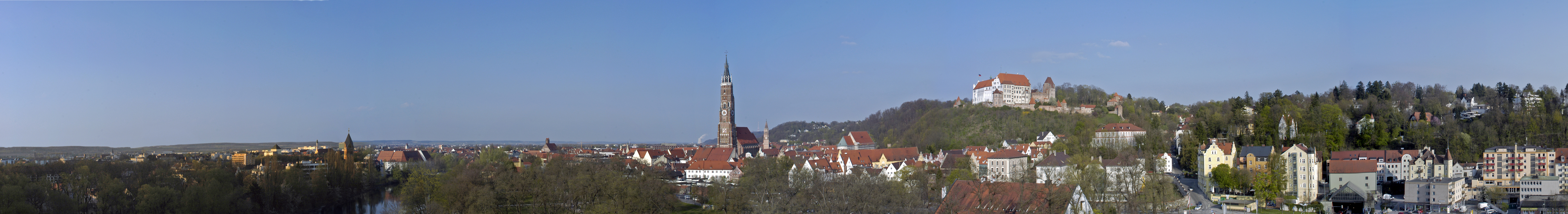
A panoramic view of Landshut

Largest groups of foreign residents
Nationality	Population (2013)
Turkey	1,275
Romania	911
Poland	730
Greece	532
Croatia	407
Austria	345
Spain	2

== Notable sites ==
Coat of arms, depicted in 1605

The town is of architectural importance because of its predominantly Gothic architecture within the historic town centre, especially Trausnitz Castle and the Church of Saint Martin featuring the world's tallest church brick tower. Among other Gothic architecture are the churches of St. Jodok and Holy Spirit, but also the Town Hall and the Ländtor, the only still existing gate of the medieval fortification.

Landshut is known for a festival celebrated every four years called the Landshuter Hochzeit, commemorating the 1475 marriage of George of Bavaria and Jadwiga Jagiellon.

The Renaissance era produced in particular the decorated inner courtyard of the Trausnitz Castle and the ducal Landshut Residence in the inner town. Baroque churches are represented by the Jesuit church St. Ignatius, the Dominican church St. Blasius and the church St. Joseph. Also, the medieval churches of the Seligenthal convent and of the Cistercians were redesigned in baroque style. Many old middle-class houses of the past in the Old Town still represent the history of the town from the Gothic times to the Neo-Classicism.

== Sport ==
The ice hockey team EV Landshut plays in the Second Division.

The motorcycle speedway team Landshut Devils is based at the Ellermühle Speedway Stadium.

The local association football team is SpVgg Landshut.

== Transport ==
Air travel is served by Munich Airport, located 40 km (25 mi) which is a half an hour drive from Landshut.

== Twin towns – sister cities ==
Landshut is twinned with:

- Elgin, Scotland, United Kingdom (1956), the Landshut Bridge in Elgin is named after Landshut
- Compiègne, France (1962)
- Ried im Innkreis, Austria (1974)
- Schio, Italy (1981)
- Sibiu, Romania (2002)

== Notable people ==
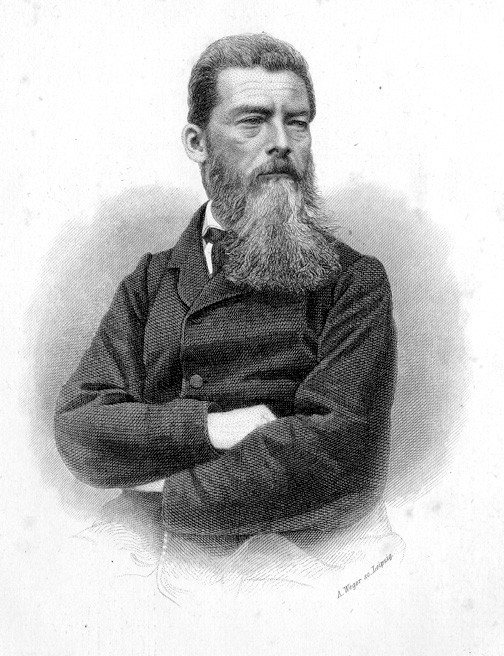
Ludwig Feuerbach

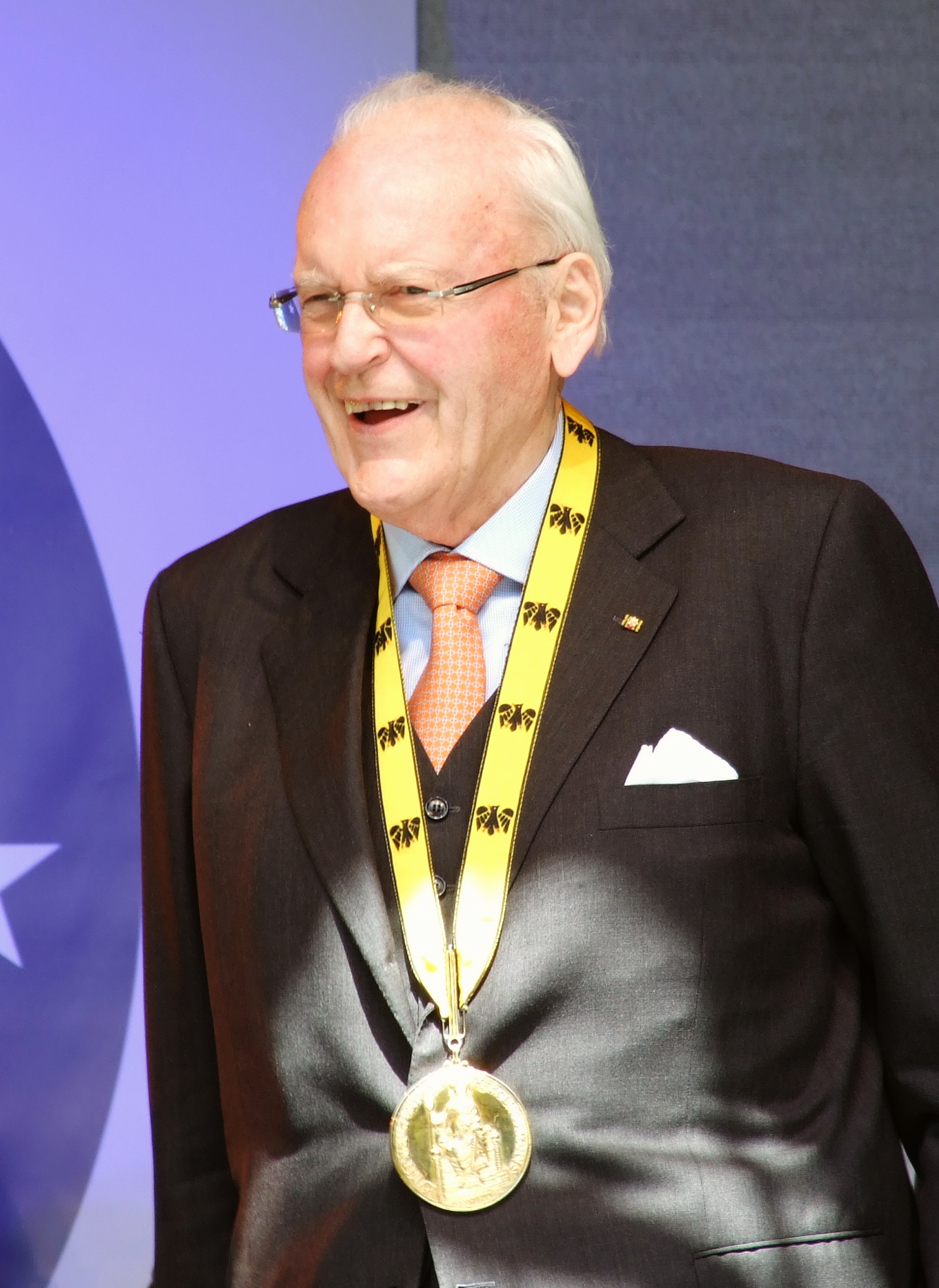
Roman Herzog, Karlspreis 2012 (Charlemagne prize)

=== Before 1920 ===
- Ulrich Füetrer (born before 1450; died around 1493 and 1502), poet and painter
- Ludwig Feuerbach (1804–1872), philosopher
- Friedrich Feuerbach (1806–1880), philologist and philosopher
- Gustav Tiedemann (1808–1849), officer
- Carl du Prel (1839–1899), philosopher, writer and occultist
- Karl Tanera (1849–1904), officer of the Bavarian Army and author
- Max Slevogt (1868–1932), painter, graphician
- Adolf Ritter von Denk (1886–?), military and paramilitary officer
- Otto Kissenberth (1893–1919), fighter pilot in World War I
- Hermann Erhardt (1903–1958), actor
- Max Schäfer (1907–1990), football player and manager
- Marlene Neubauer-Woerner (1918–2010), sculptor

=== 1920–present ===
- Marlene Reidel (1923–2014), illustrator
- Josef Deimer (1936-2026), politician and Lord mayor of Landshut from 1970 to 2014
- Roman Herzog (1934–2017), politician (CDU), President of Germany from 1994 to 1999, then Honorary Citizen as well
- Klaus Auhuber (born 1951), ice hockey player
- Gerhard Tausche (born 1958), archivist and author
- Gerd Truntschka (born 1958), ice hockey player
- Klaus Holetschek (born 1964), politician
- Martin Bayerstorfer (born 1966), politician
- Alex Holzwarth (born 1968), drummer
- Wolfgang Stark (born 1969), football referee
- Markus Brunnermeier (born 1969), financial economist
- Annette Dytrt (born 1983), figure skater

=== Honorary citizens ===
- Hans Leinberger (1475/1480 – after 1531), sculptor
- Ludwig Andreas Feuerbach, (1804–1872), philosopher and anthropologist
- Roman Herzog (1934–2017), President of Germany 1994–1999
- Josef Deimer (1936-2026), Lord Mayor of Landshut 1970–2004
- Erich Kühnhackl (born 1950), ice hockey player

=== Notable inhabitants ===
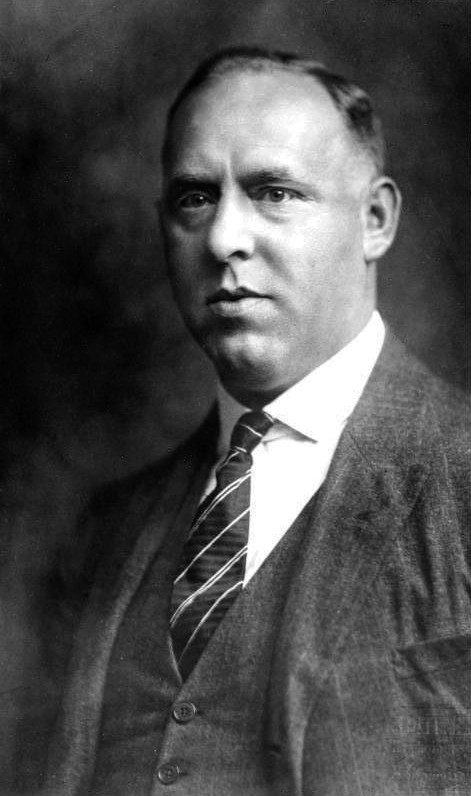
Gregor Strasser, 1928

- Louis I, Duke of Bavaria (1173–1231), Duke of Bavaria and Count Palatine of the Rhine
- Hans von Burghausen (born 1350–1360; died 1432), builder
- Hans Stethaimer (1360–1432), architect, mason and painter
- Hans Leinberger (1480–1531), sculptor of the late Gothic
- Götz von Berlichingen (1480–1562), Frankish Empire Knights
- Renata of Lorraine (1544–1602), Duchess of Bavaria
- Johann Graf von Aldringen (1588–1634), commander
- Franz von Paula Schrank (1747–1835), botanist
- Johann Michael Sailer (1751–1832), Catholic theologian and bishop of Regensburg
- Franz Xaver Witt (1834–1888), church musician, composer, reformer, founder of the German general Cecilia Association
- Max Freiherr von Oppenheim (1860–1946), diplomat, orientalist and archaeologist
- Ludwig Thoma (1867–1921), writer
- Hans Carossa (1878–1956), doctor, known as a poet and writer of short stories
- Gregor Strasser (1892–1934), National Socialist politician
- Heinrich Himmler (1900–1945), National Socialist politician, head of the SS
- Marlene Neubauer-Woerner (1918–2010), sculptor
- Fritz Koenig (1924–2017), sculptor
- Heinz Winbeck (1946–2019), composer
- Erich Kühnhackl (born 1950), ice hockey player
- Tom Kühnhackl (born 1992), ice hockey player
- David Elsner (born 1992), ice hockey player
- Herbert Hainer (born 1954), manager
- Steffen Kummerer (born 1985), musician, guitarist of Obscura

== Gallery ==
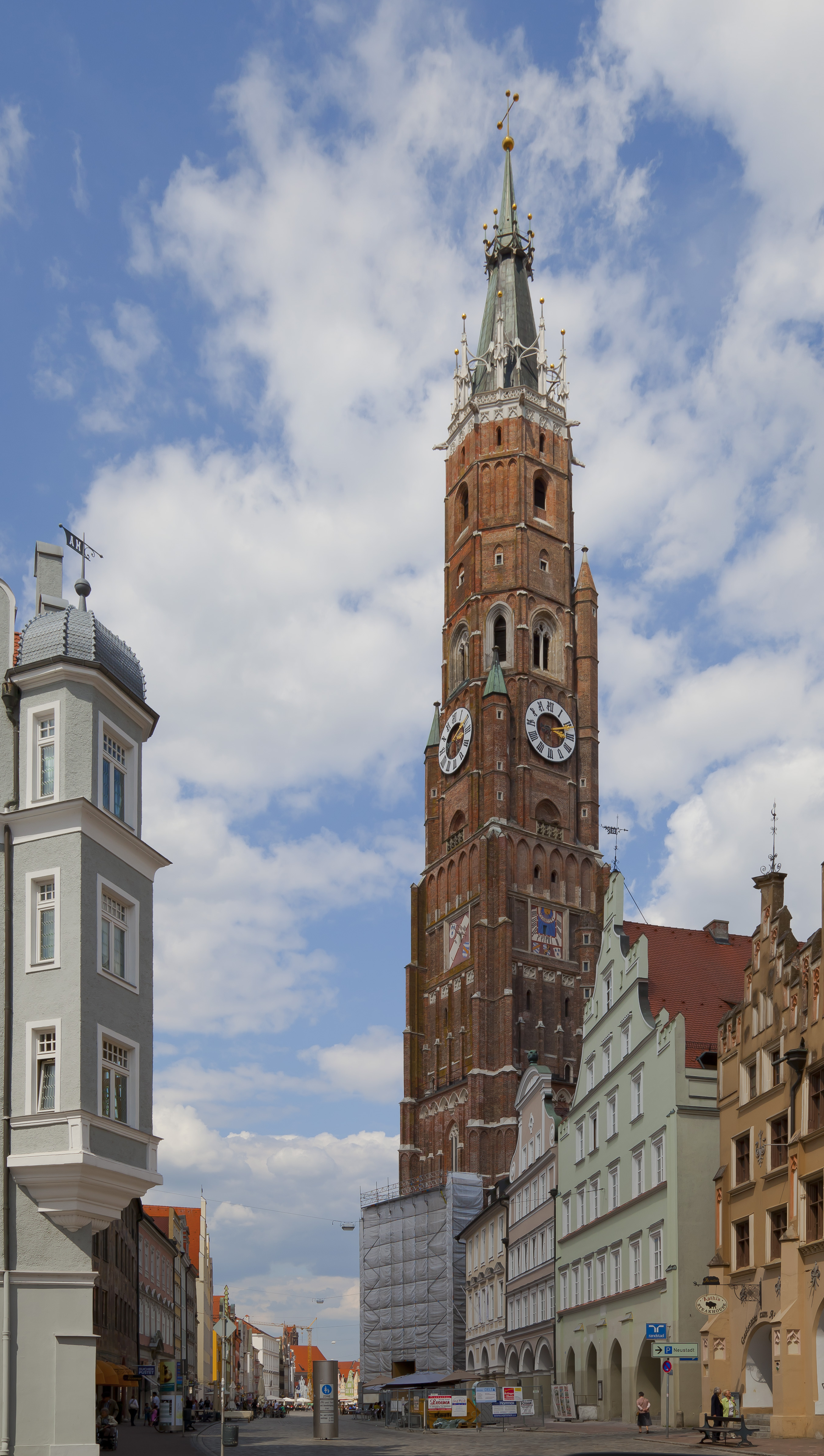
The Cathedral of St. Martin with its bell tower

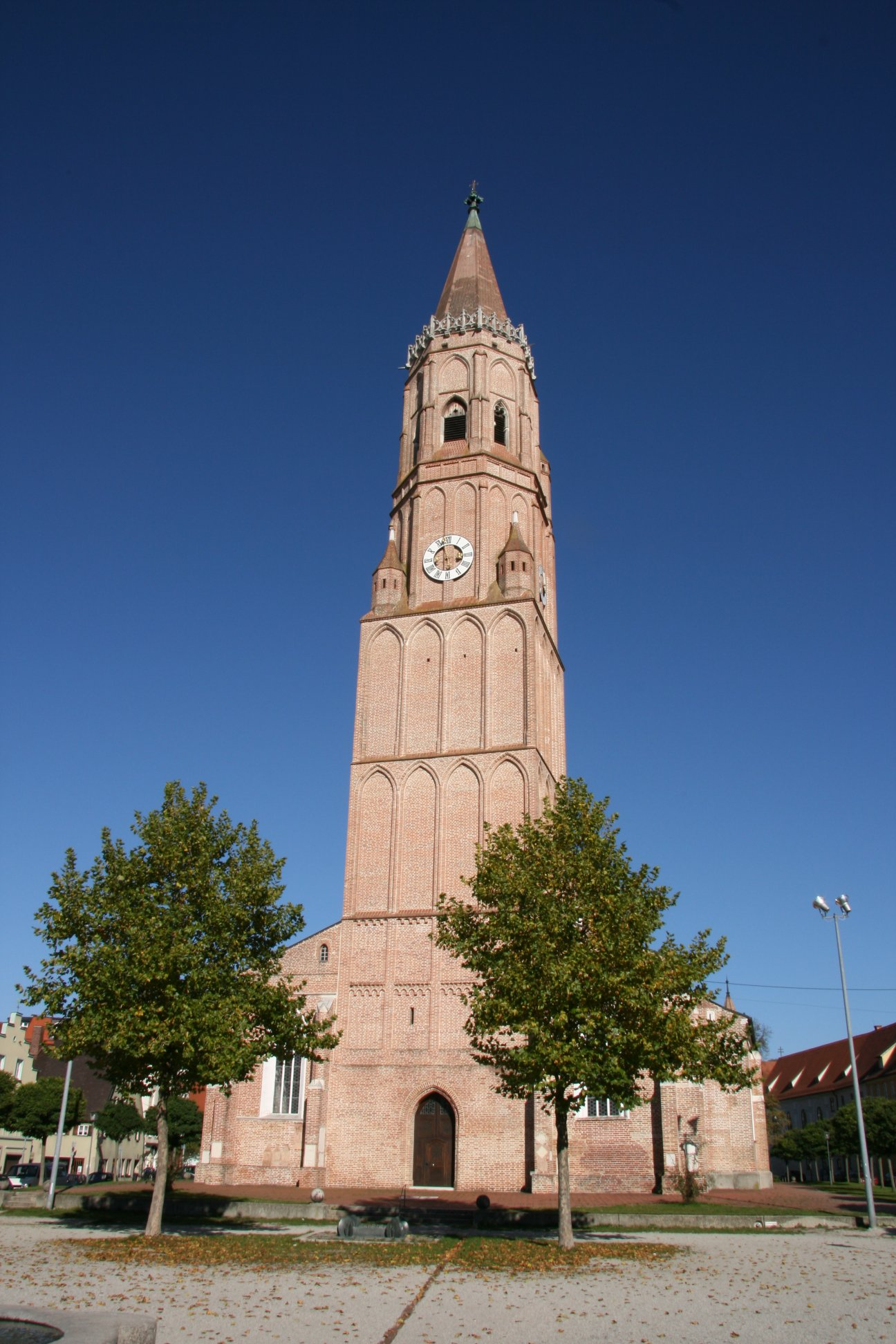
The Church of St. Jodok

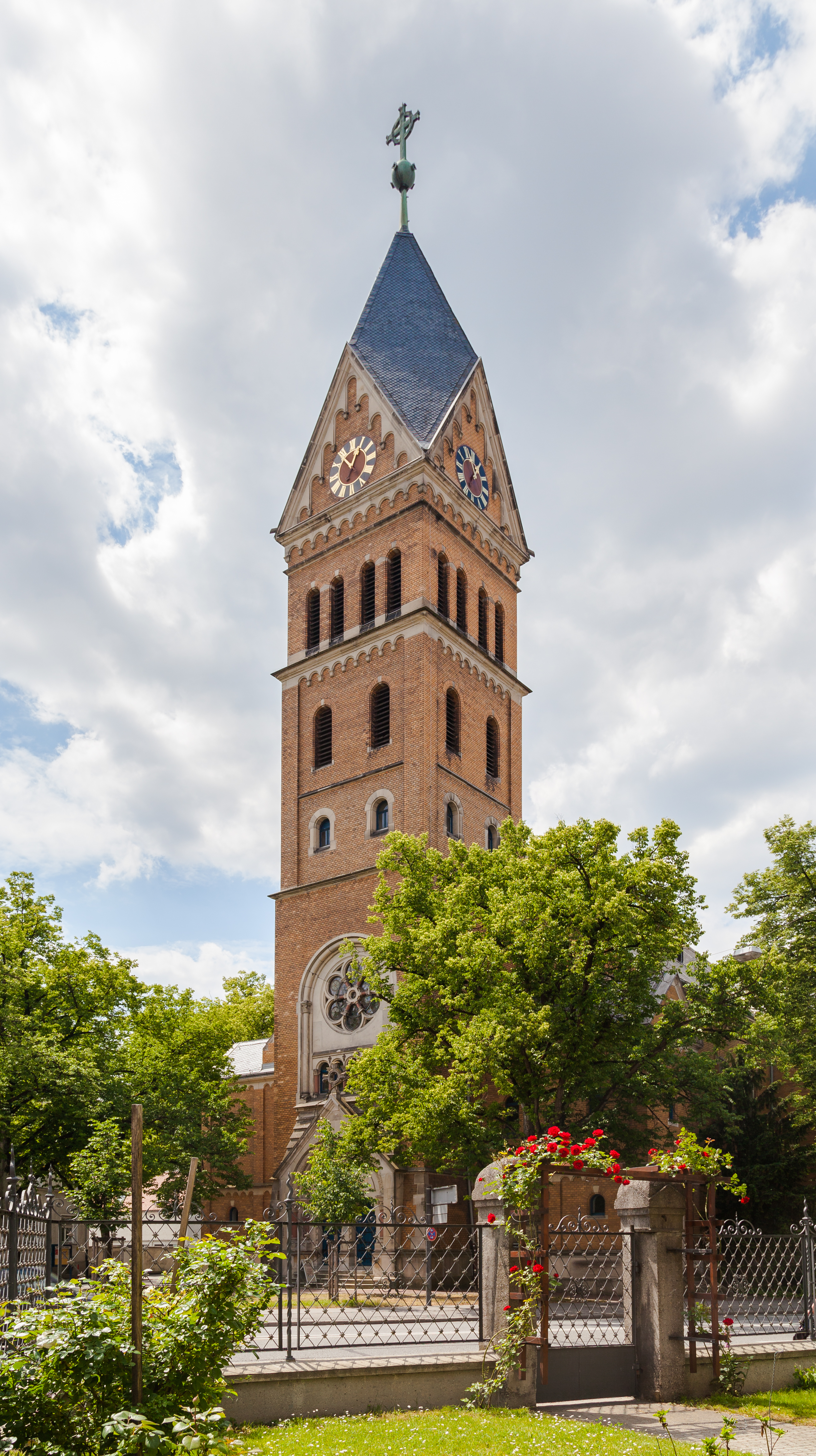
Redemption church

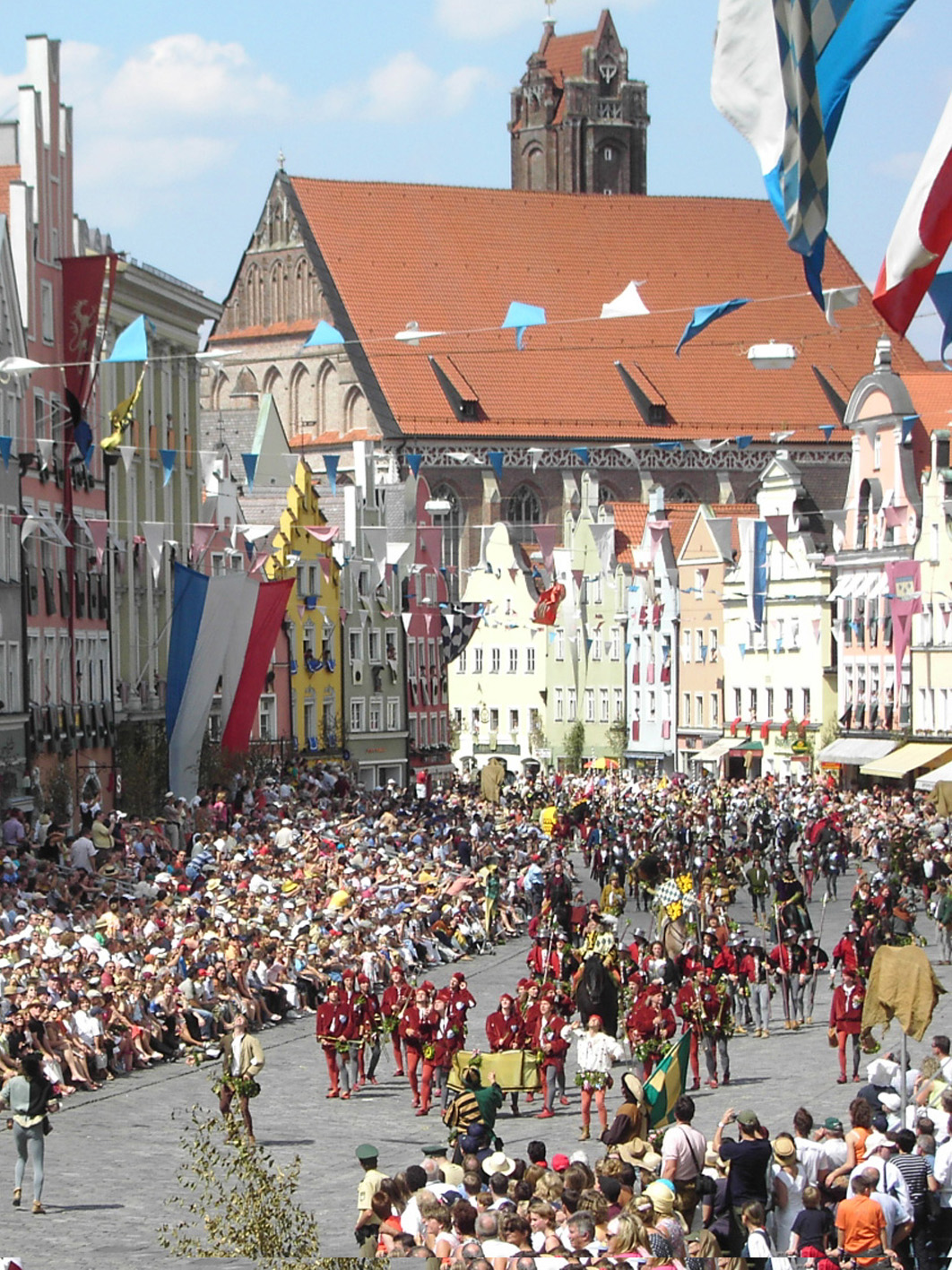
The Landshut Wedding and the Church of the Holy Spirit

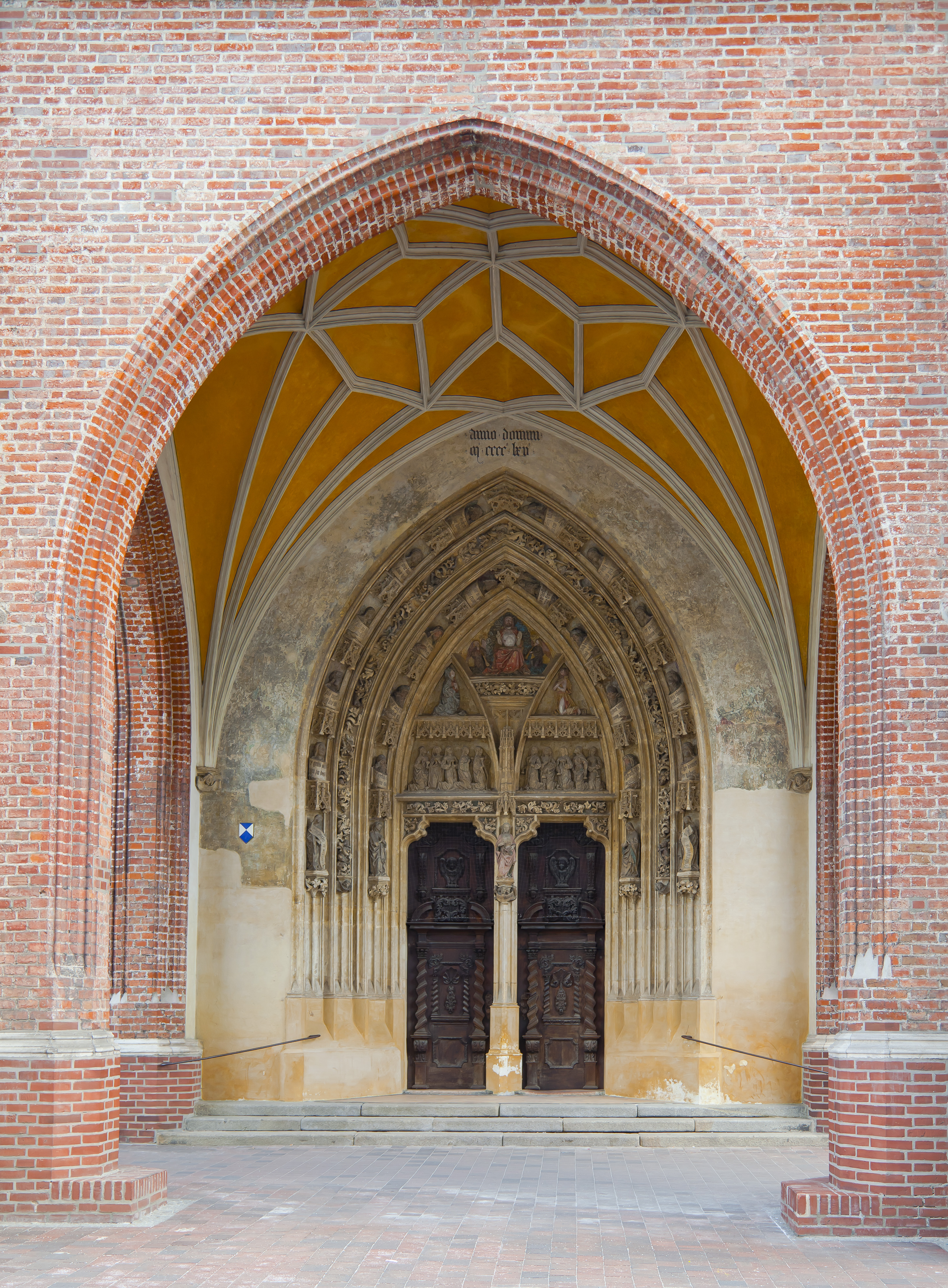
Church of the Holy Ghost, Gothic porch

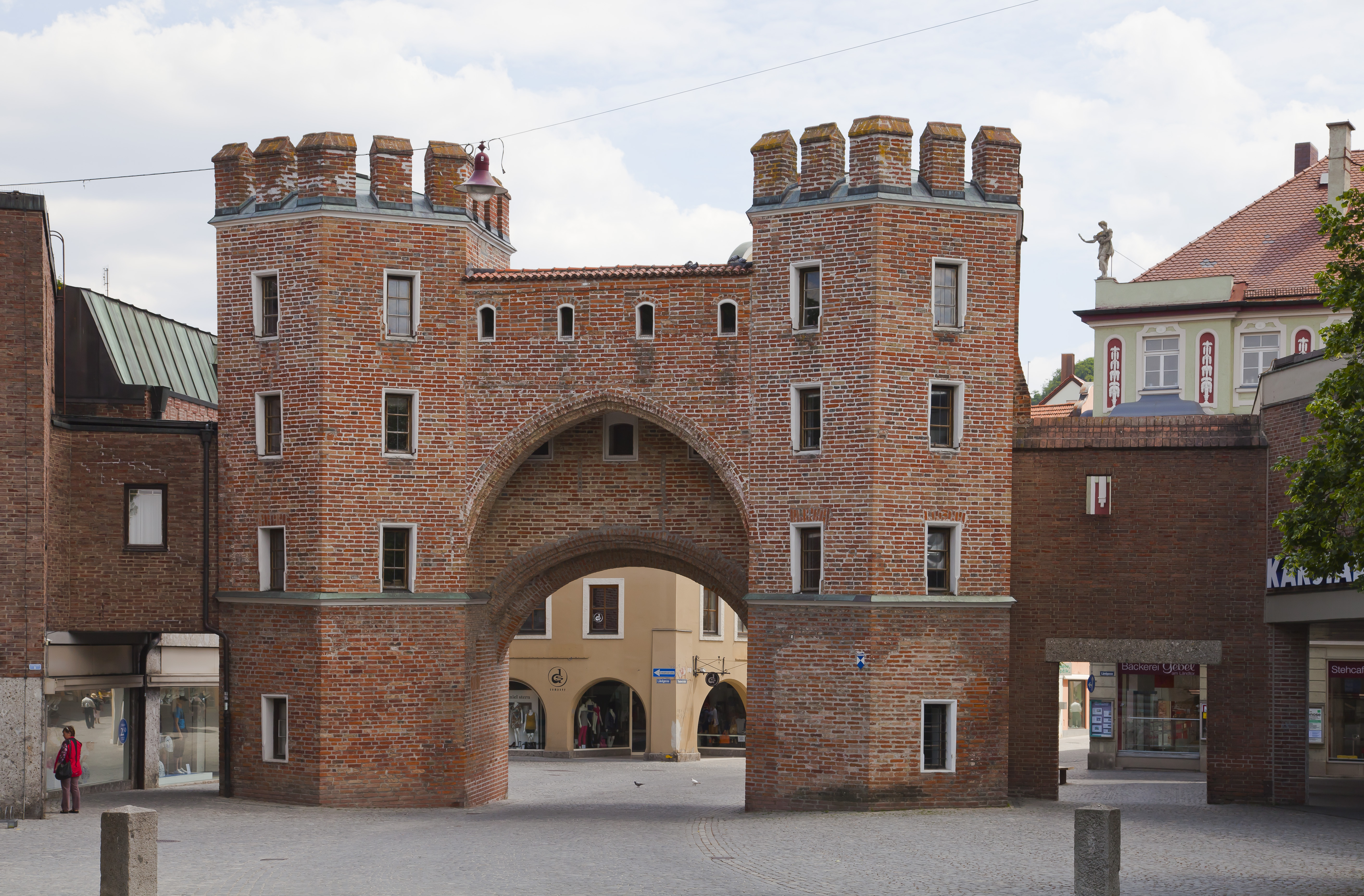
The Ländtor

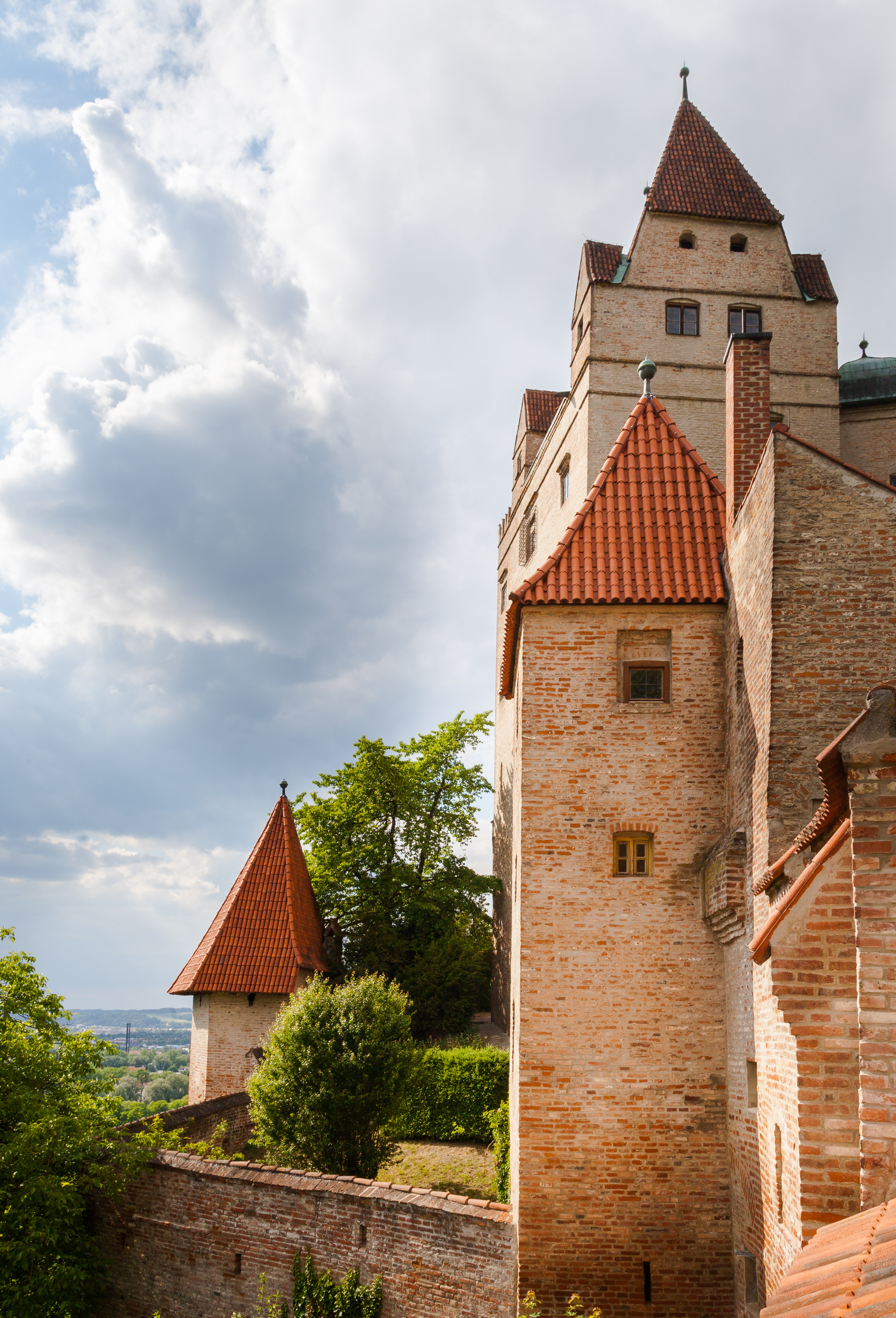
The Trausnitz Castle

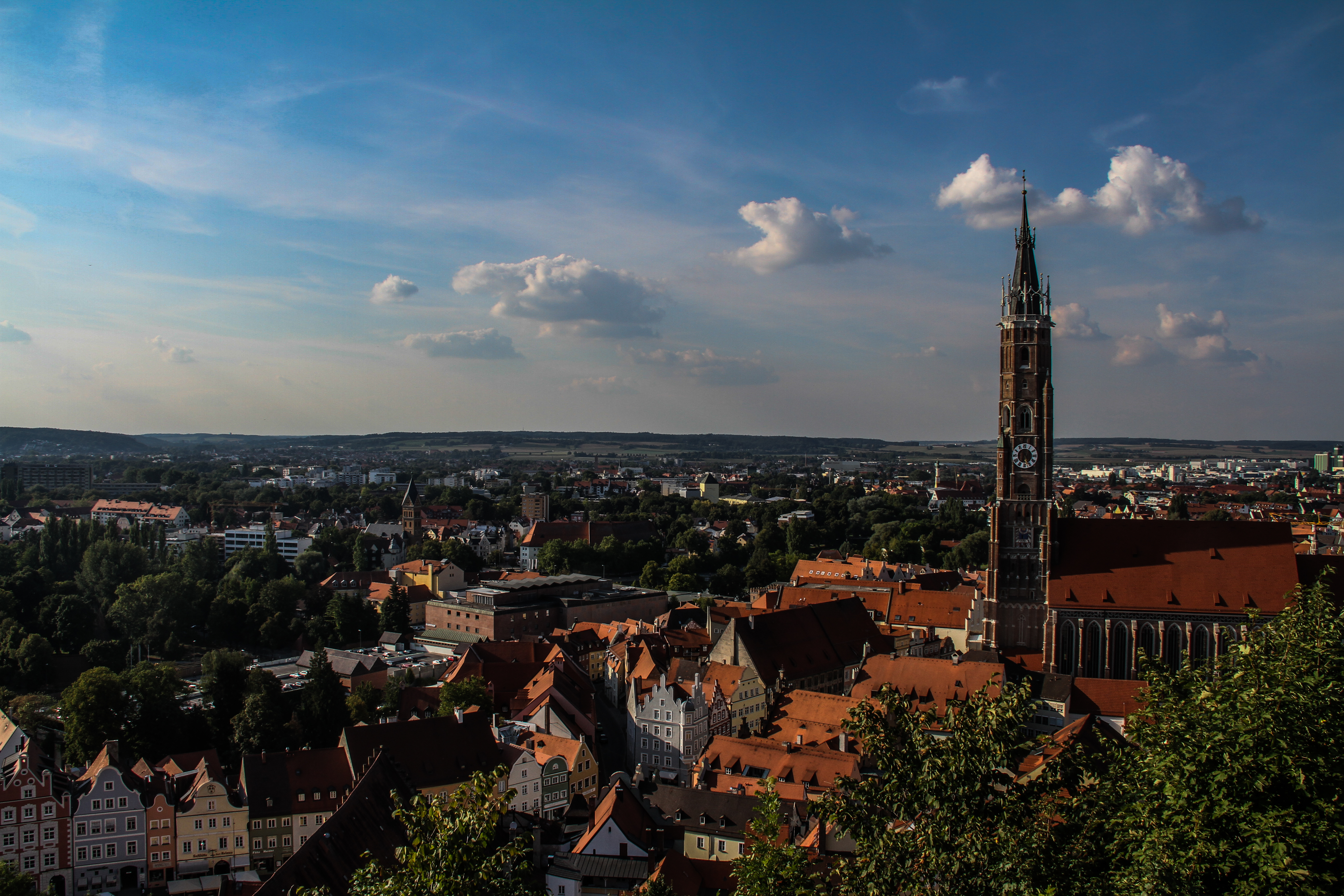
Landshut city view

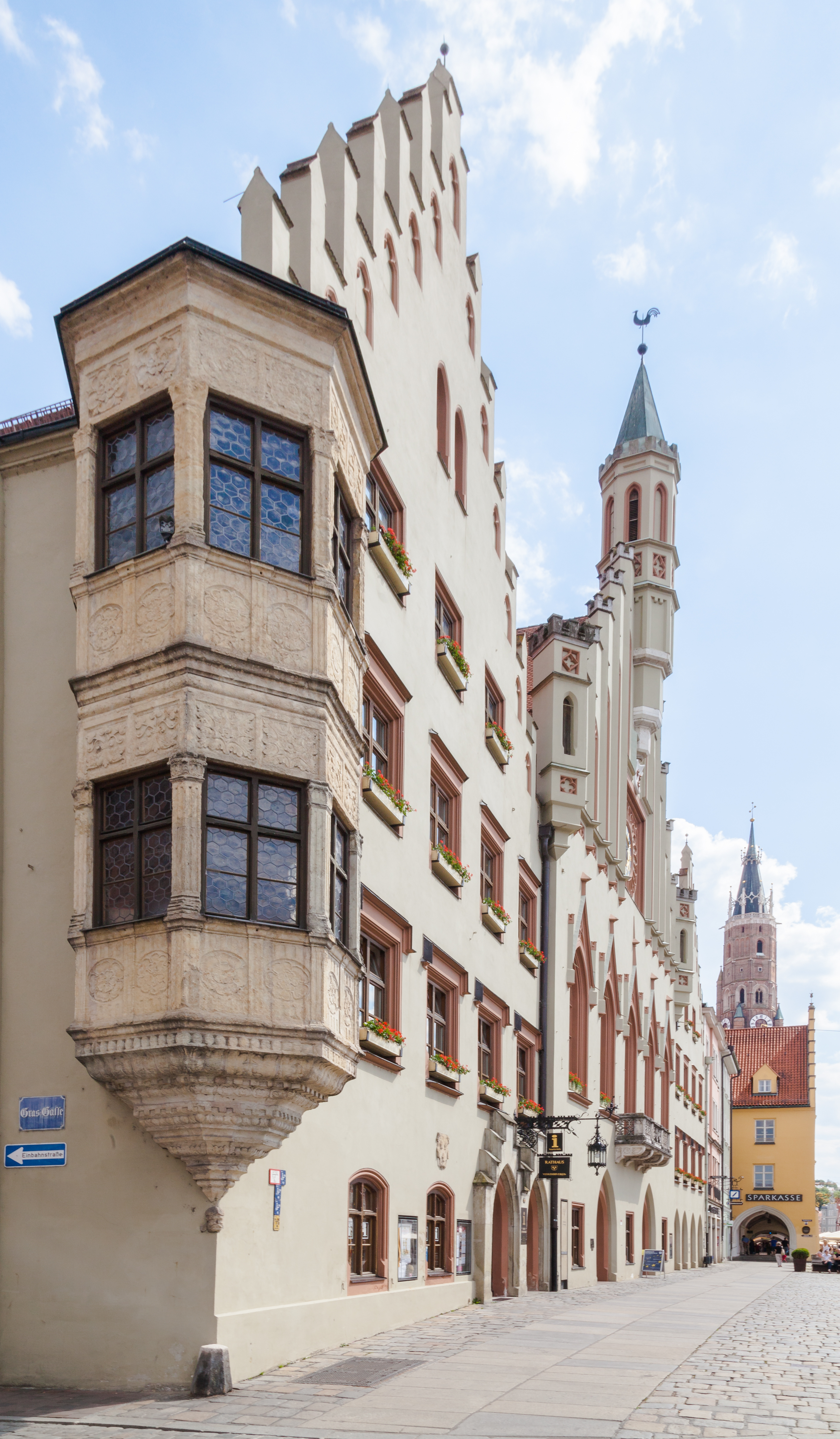
Town hall

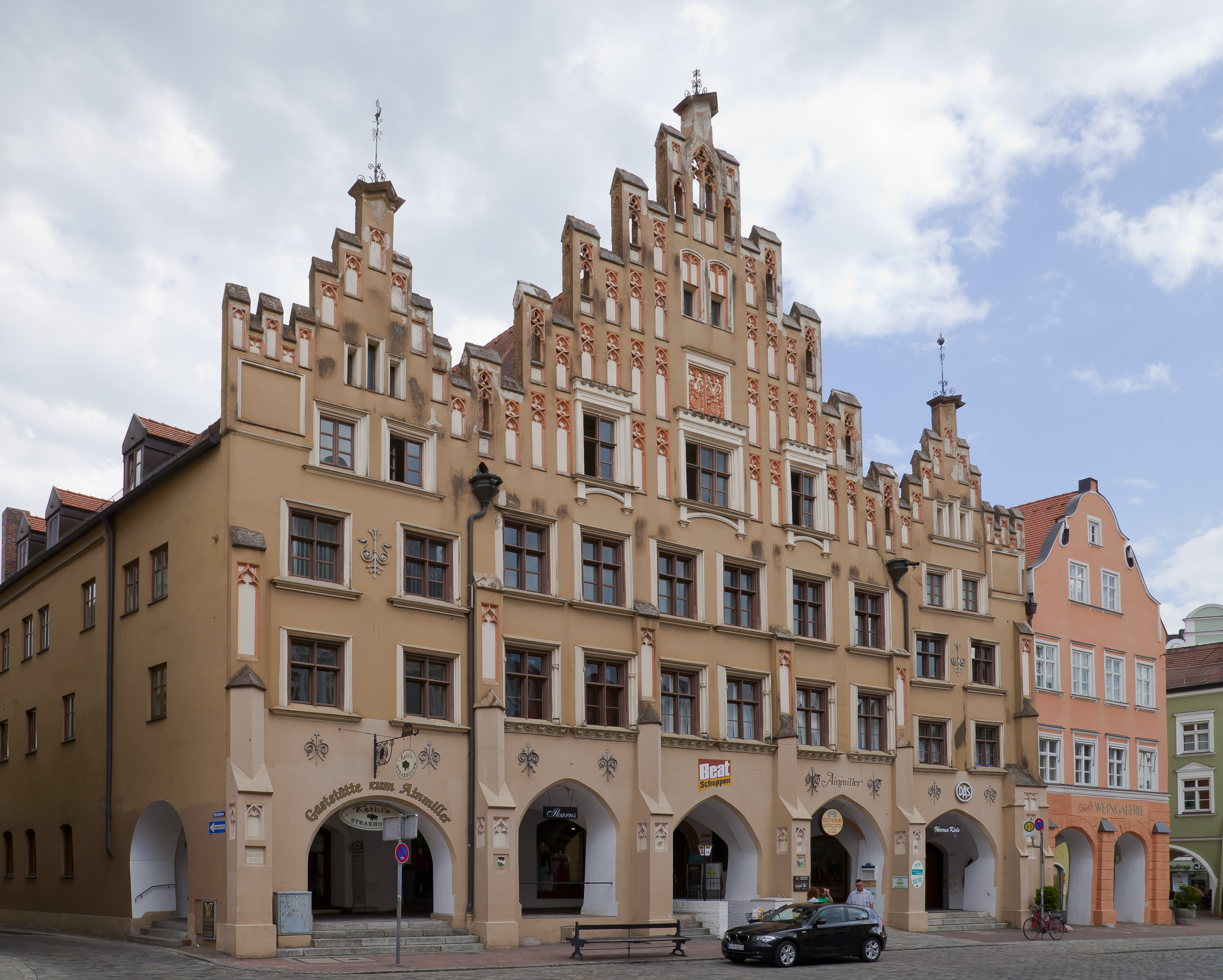
Old town

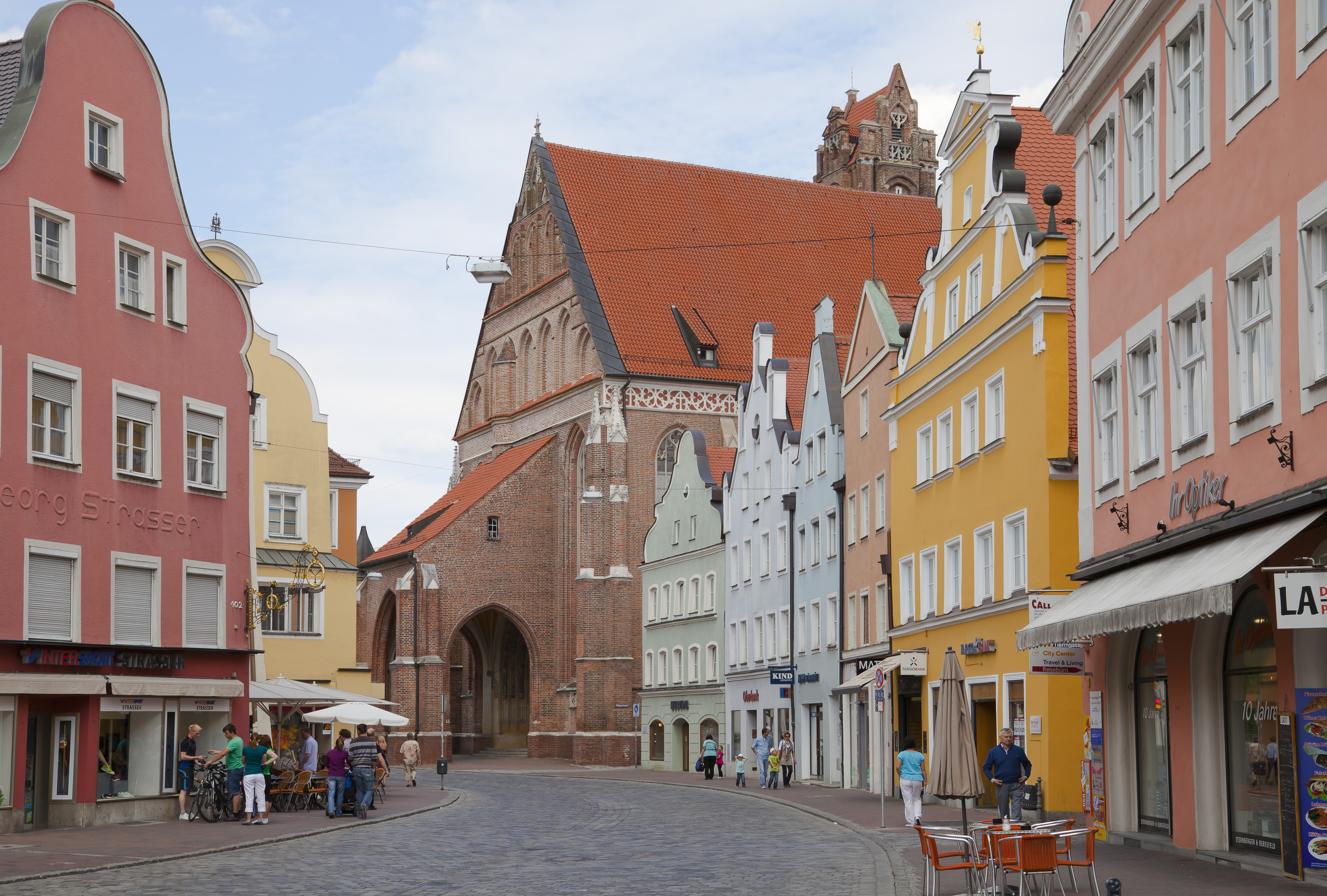
Alstadt St, the pedestrian area

== See also ==
- Battle of Abensberg, occurred 20 April 1809
- Battle of Landshut, occurred 21 April 1809
- Battle of Eckmühl, occurred 21–22 April 1809
- Abensberg
- Eckmühl
