= Josef Deimer =

German politician (1936–2026)

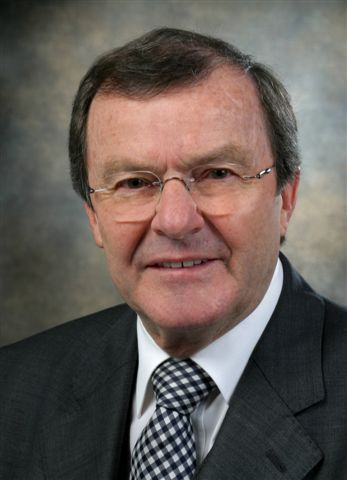
Deimer in 2003

Josef Deimer (29 May 1936 – 12 August 2026) was a German politician who was a representative of the Christian Social Union of Bavaria. Between 1982 and 2000 he was a member of the Bavarian Senate. He was the mayor of his birthplace, Landshut, from 1970 to 2004.

Deimer died on 12 August 2026, at the age of 90.

== See also ==
- List of Bavarian Christian Social Union politicians
