= Hans Leinberger =

German sculptor

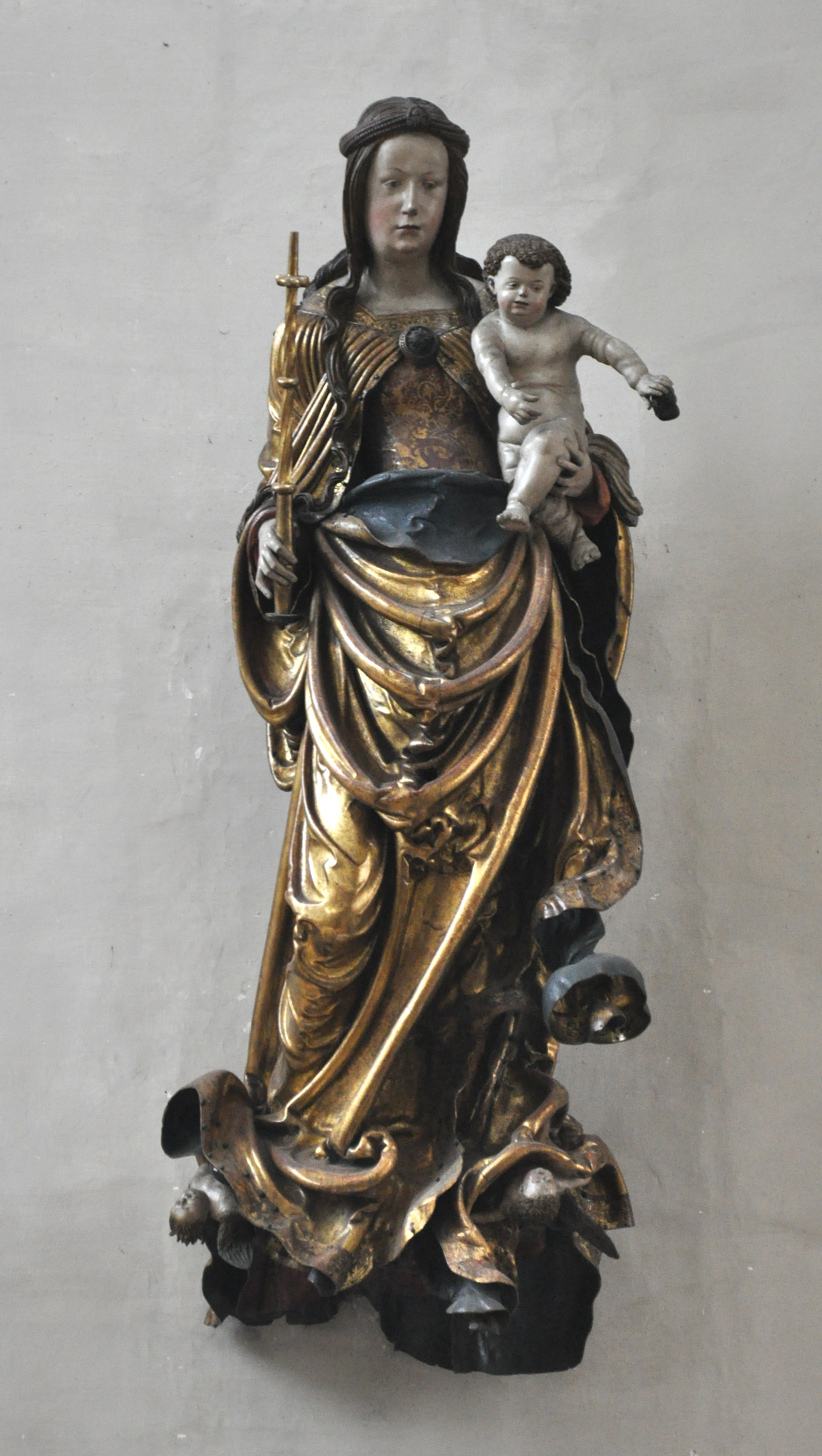
The Madonna in Saint Martin's Church (1516/18)

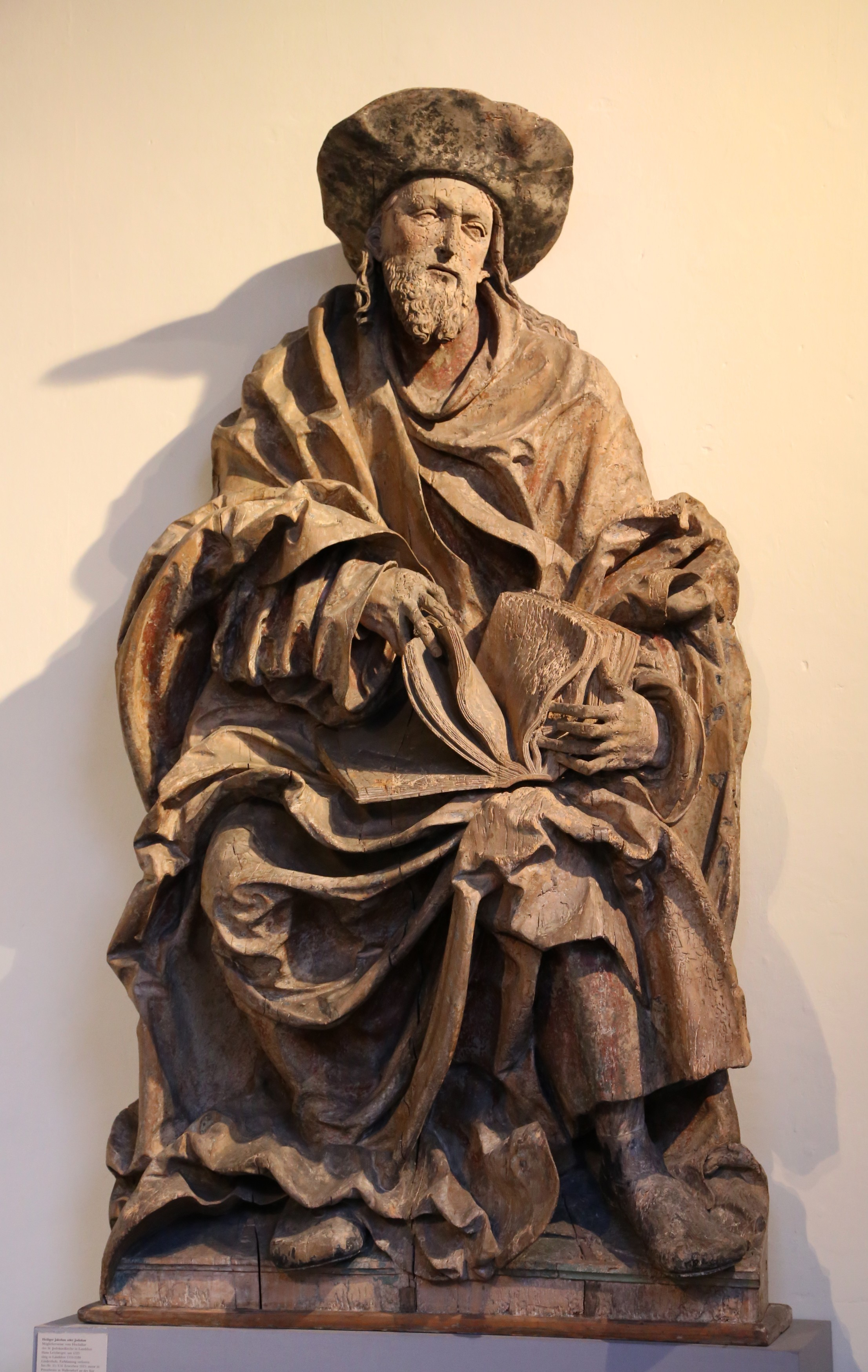
Saint Judoc (1525)

Hans Leinberger, sometimes given as Lemberger (c.1475/1480 – after 1531) was a Late Gothic sculptor from Altbayern, who worked in wood, metal and stone.

== Life and work ==
His exact birthplace is unknown, as is the place and manner of his artistic education. The first documented reference to him involves his residency in Landshut in 1510. The location of his workshop there remains a matter of speculation. After 1516, he did work for Louis X, Duke of Bavaria, who lived there while he was co-regent with his brother William IV. Wage receipts from 1529/30 indicate that he probably held a position similar to an official court artist. None of the works he created in that capacity appear to have survived.

He may have been the brother of Georg Lemberger, a painter and woodcut artist who also lived in Landshut, but the relationship is unclear.

His fame today rests largely upon the high altar at the Church of Saint Castulus in Moosburg an der Isar. Completed in 1514, it is the largest surviving altarpiece in Altbayern (although it was significantly modified in the 18th century by Christian Jorhan the Elder). That same year, he created a statue of Albert IV for the Hofkirche, Innsbruck from a drawing provided by Albrecht Dürer; a sign of the esteem in which he must have been held.

His later works include a Madonna for the Church of Saint Martin (1516/18) and a seated figure of Saint Judoc for his namesake church (c.1525) which is now in the Bayerisches Nationalmuseum. His last known works were altar figures for the Liebfrauenkirche in Polling, but only two (a Madonna and a Man of Sorrows) have survived.
