= Hans von Burghausen =

German architect

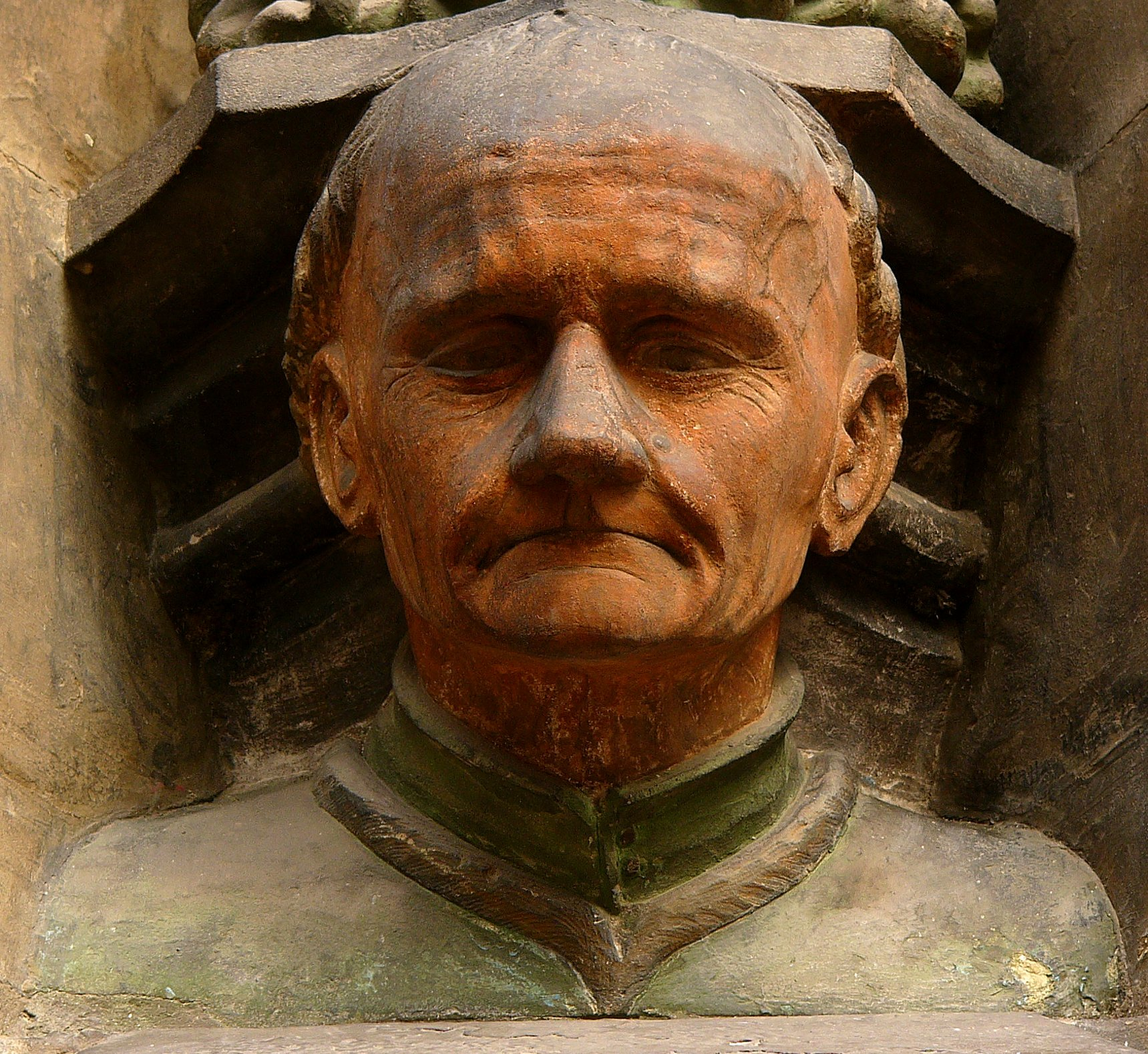
Hans von Burghausen

Hans von Burghausen (1350s in Burghausen, Bavaria—10 August 1432) was a German architect. He designed the Church of St Martin, Landshut, and completed it in 1498.

== Bibliography ==
- Friedrich Kobler, 1985: Hanns von Burghausen, Steinmetz – Über den gegenwärtigen Forschungsstand zu Leben und Werk des Baumeisters. In: Alte und moderne Kunst, 30, 198/199, pp. 7–16
- Peter Baldass, 1950: Hans Stethaimers wahrer Name. In: Wiener Jahrbuch für Kunstgeschichte. Bd. 14, pp. 47–64 ISSN 0083-9981
- John W. Cook, 1976: A New Chronology of Hanns von Burghausen's Late Gothic Architecture. In: Gesta. Vol. 15, No. 1/2 = Essays in Honor of Sumner McKnight Crosby, pp. 97–104
- Volker Liedke, 1984: Hanns Purghauser, genannt Meister Hanns von Burghausen, sein Neffe Hanns Stethaimer und sein Sohn Stefan Purghauser, die drei Baumeister an St. Martin in Landshut. In: Volker Liedke, Norbert Nussbaum, Hans Puchta: Beiträge zum Leben und Werk des Meisters Hans von Burghausen. Teil 1 (= Burghauser Geschichtsblätter. Folge 39, pp. 1–70. ZDB-ID 342459–5). Stadt Burghausen
