= Trausnitz Castle =

Castle in Landshut, Bavaria, Germany

- Landshut, Bavaria, Germany
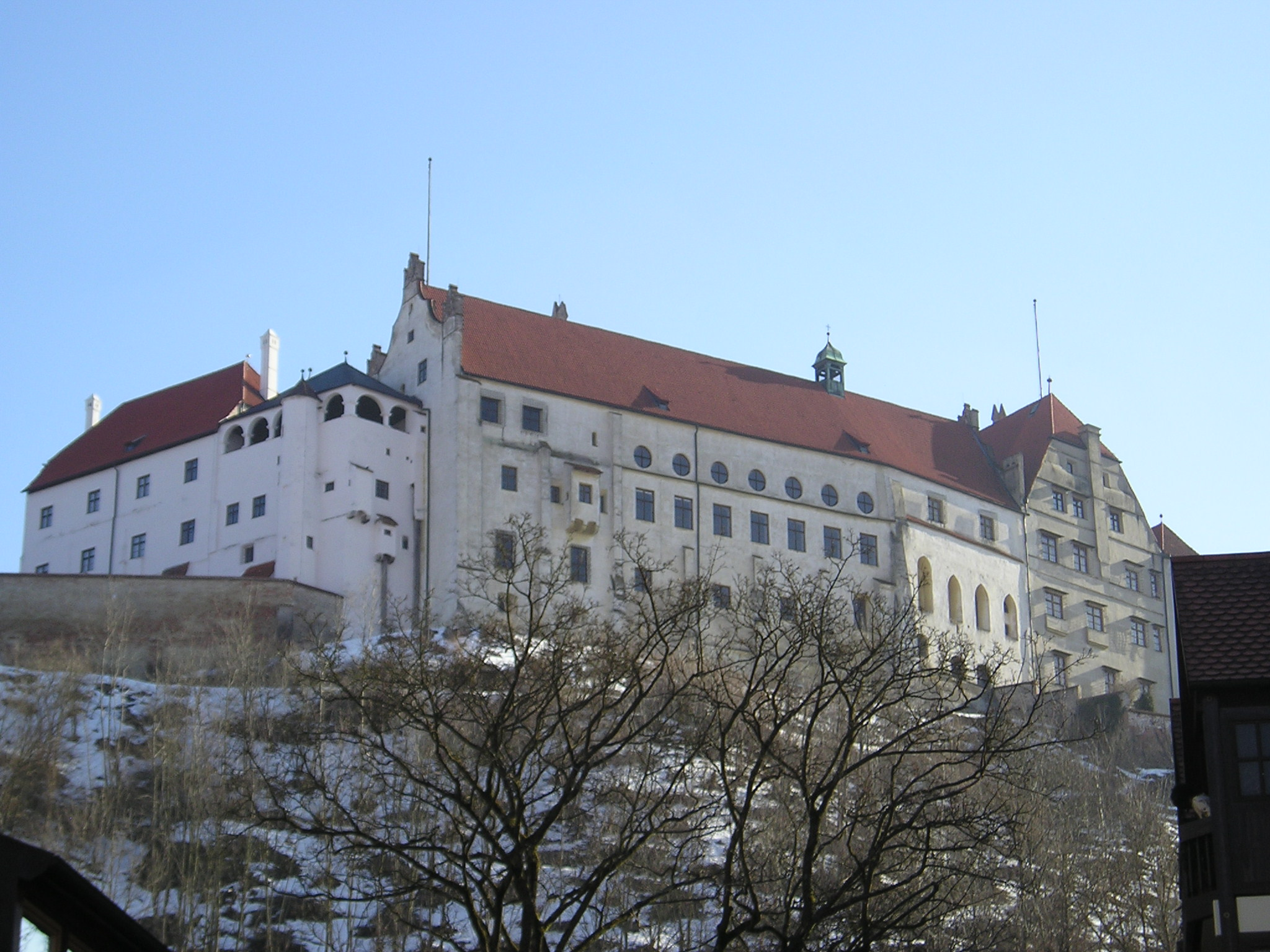

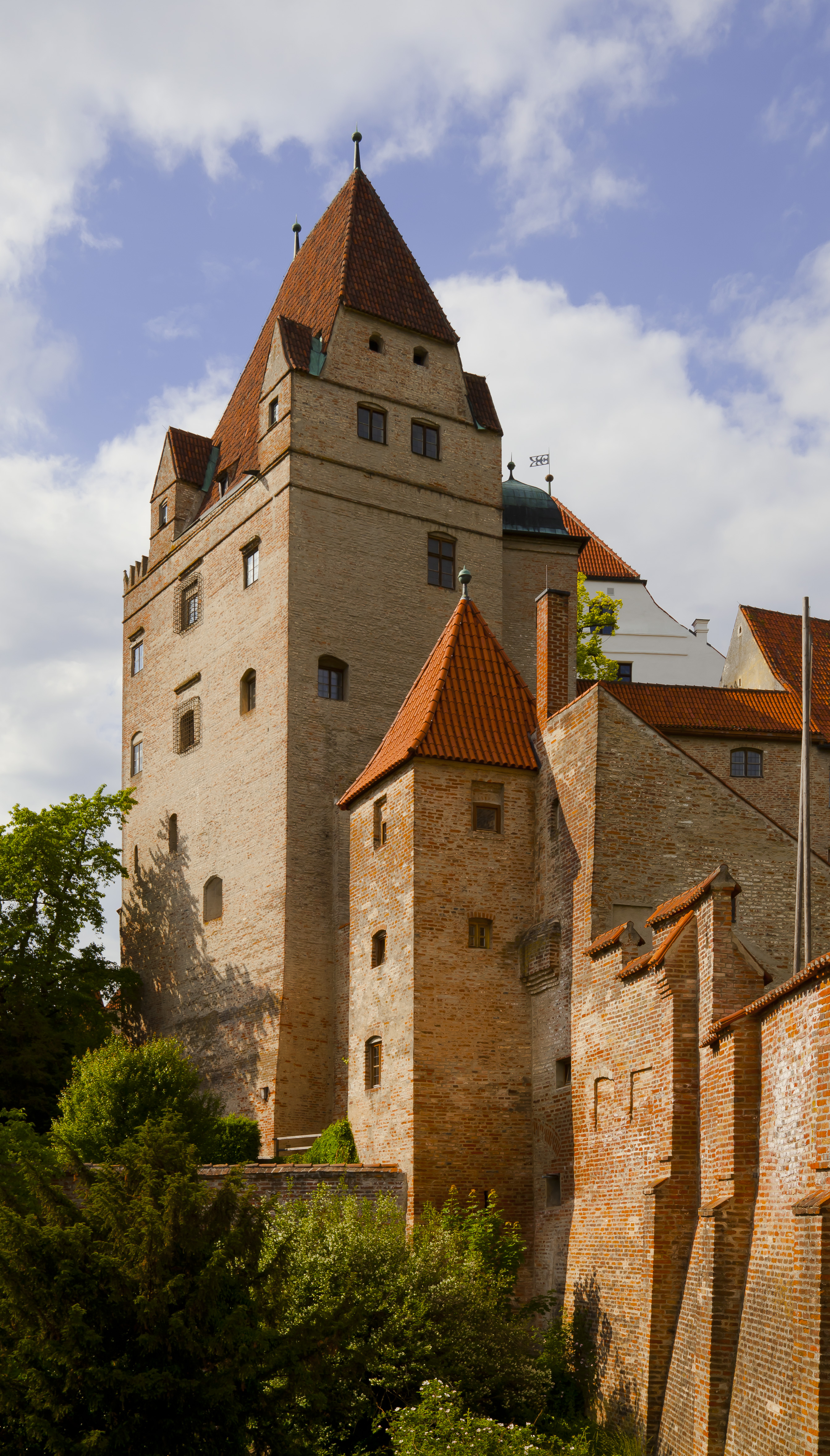
- Trausnitz castle

Site information
- Type: Visitor attraction
- Owner: Bavarian Palace Administration
- Open to the public: Yes
- Website: https://www.burg-trausnitz.de/

Location
- Coordinates: 48°31′54″N 12°09′08″E

Site history
- Built: 1204

Trausnitz Castle is a medieval castle situated in Landshut, Bavaria in Germany.

It was the home of the Wittelsbach dynasty, and it served as their ducal residence for Lower Bavaria from 1255–1503, and later as the seat of the hereditary rulers of the whole of Bavaria. The castle was founded in 1204 by Duke Ludwig I.

== Castle features ==
=== Knights' Hall ===
The Knights' Hall of Castle Trausnitz belongs to the main buildings of the 13th century and there were already around 1260/70. The room is 245 m^{2} and is separated in two naves, to four "Jochen" a nave. The constructions that were used belong to the time period of the so-called "Zisterziensergotik". Today the Knights' Hall is used for festival banquets or for short exhibitions.

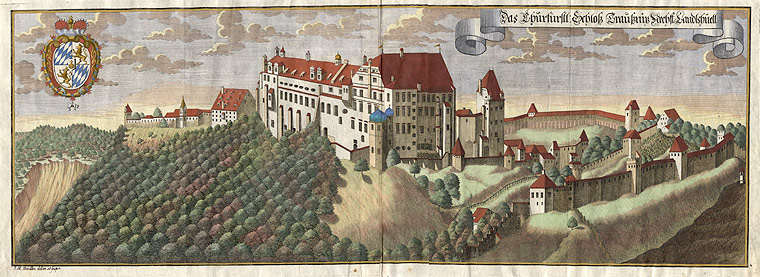
Trausnitz by Michael Wening (1645–1718)

=== Tower Terrace (Söller) ===
The "Loggia", already called so since 1493, was finished in the 16th century. The Tower Terrace sports a great view of the city through the round arcs. On the east side there is a stair tower. The wooden ceiling with shaped rosettes is descended from the time of Wilhelm V. There is a stone walled music platform on the south side of the room. The "Söller" is today used for many different functions, and it holds a maximum of 99 people.

=== White Hall ===
The White Hall is on the first floor of the Dürnitz tract and is directly above the Knights' Hall. The White Hall has probably existed since the 15th century and was most likely planned as a big ballroom. It appears that the hall was never finished, because there are no traces of paintings as usual for the castle at this time. The approximately 240 m^{2} tall room, which is two floors large, is used today for banquets, greetings, concerts and lectures.

=== Chamber of art and curiosities ===
A phenomenon in the Renaissance that proliferated Europe throughout the 16th and 17th centuries, the cabinet of curiosities was in essence a personal collection of rare, unknown and marvelous objects. Popular, visual and encyclopedic in their approach, these cabinets, or Wunderkammern, included a diversity of specimens from both known and newly discovered worlds. These collections of curious objects that are seemingly not human in nature require the idea or application of human characteristics and traits to describe their inhuman state.

The Trausnitz Chamber of Art and Curiosities which was arranged by Prince Wilhelm in 1579 and then taken to Munich is a collection of 750 exhibits including works of art, treasures from the Orient and curiosities typical of the collections owned by rulers in the Renaissance era. It was reopened in September 2004 as one part of the Bavarian National Museum. The chamber is divided into four different themes. ARTIFICIALA—wondrous legerdemains—contains sumptuous bronze and painting but also midget carving of plum stones. NATURALIA—the wonder of nature—gets shown stuffed animals, extraordinary horns, mussels and minerals. The hall of EXOTICA—marvellousness from foreign countries—contains craft of corals, ivory and nacre whereas SCIENTIFICA—scientific arranges the world—shows scientific instruments of rational acquisition of the world in year 1600.

== History ==
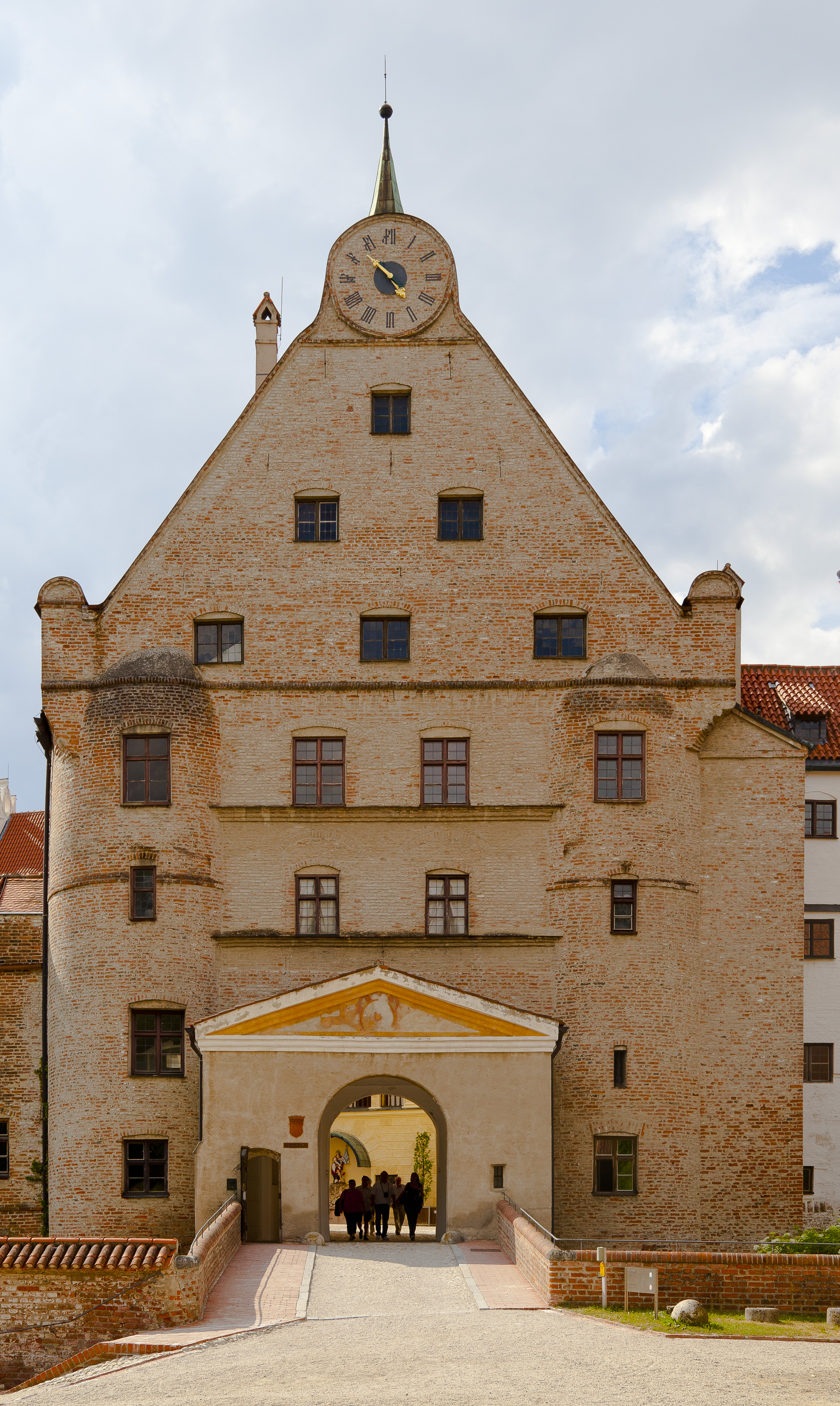
Entrance

Trausnitz Castle is situated atop a hill above Landshut. Before the 16th century, it had the same name as the town, Landshut, which translates into "protector of the land". Previously, the castle guarded over the city and the surrounding land. The size of the castle has remained almost the same since Louis I of Bavaria in 1204. The castle was completed by the time of Emperor Frederick II's visit in 1235.

During the first half of the 13th century, Trausnitz represented not only the centre of imperial politics but also of Staufer culture. Landshut was visited by famous minstrel singers, including Walter von der Vogelweide and Tannhäuser, during this period. The patronage of art by the Dukes of Bavaria was so high that they sent for a sculptor from Strasbourg who created jewellery for a sculpture that now stands in the Castle's "Burgkapelle".

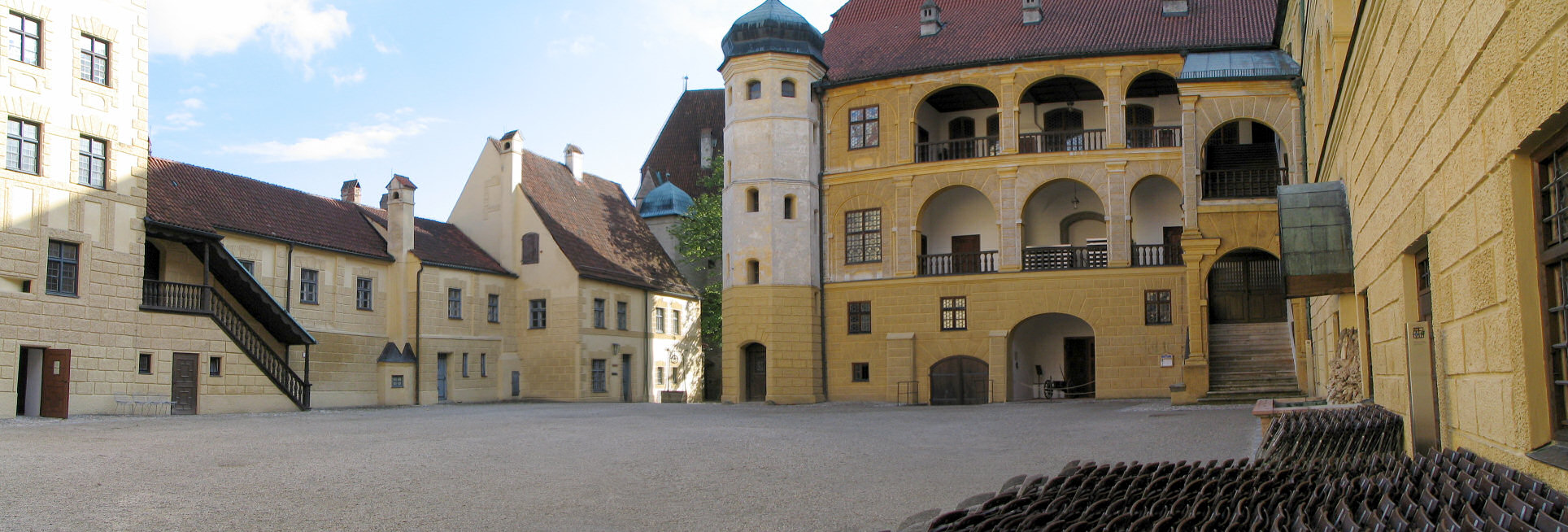
Trausnitz Castle courtyard

The wealthy Duke of Landshut repeatedly renovated and expanded the buildings in Burg Trausnitz during the 15th century. The Dürnitz was built during this time. The outer defensive ring of walls were heightened and extended for the defensive towers.

Duke Louis X of Bavaria furnished the castle in 1516 in the south German Renaissance style, though few examples remain today. The arcades of the courtyard were created 1568–1578 by Friedrich Sustris for Crown Prince William. Many paintings in the Florentine style were added at this time, but most were lost due to fires over the years. Later, Prince Ferdinand Maria (1675–1679) undertook restoration of the burned paintings and decorated other rooms with other paintings.

During the 18th century, the castle was used as a barracks and a prison for noble prisoners. At the beginning of the 19th century, it was used as a hospital.

King Ludwig II of Bavaria (who was the creator of Neuschwanstein Castle in Füssen) ordered the decoration of a new splendid private apartment in the second floor of the prince's wing (1869–1873).

On 21 October 1961, a fire destroyed much of the interior decoration, including the king's rooms.
