= Reliquary Crown of Henry II =

Medieval crown

Crown of Henry II
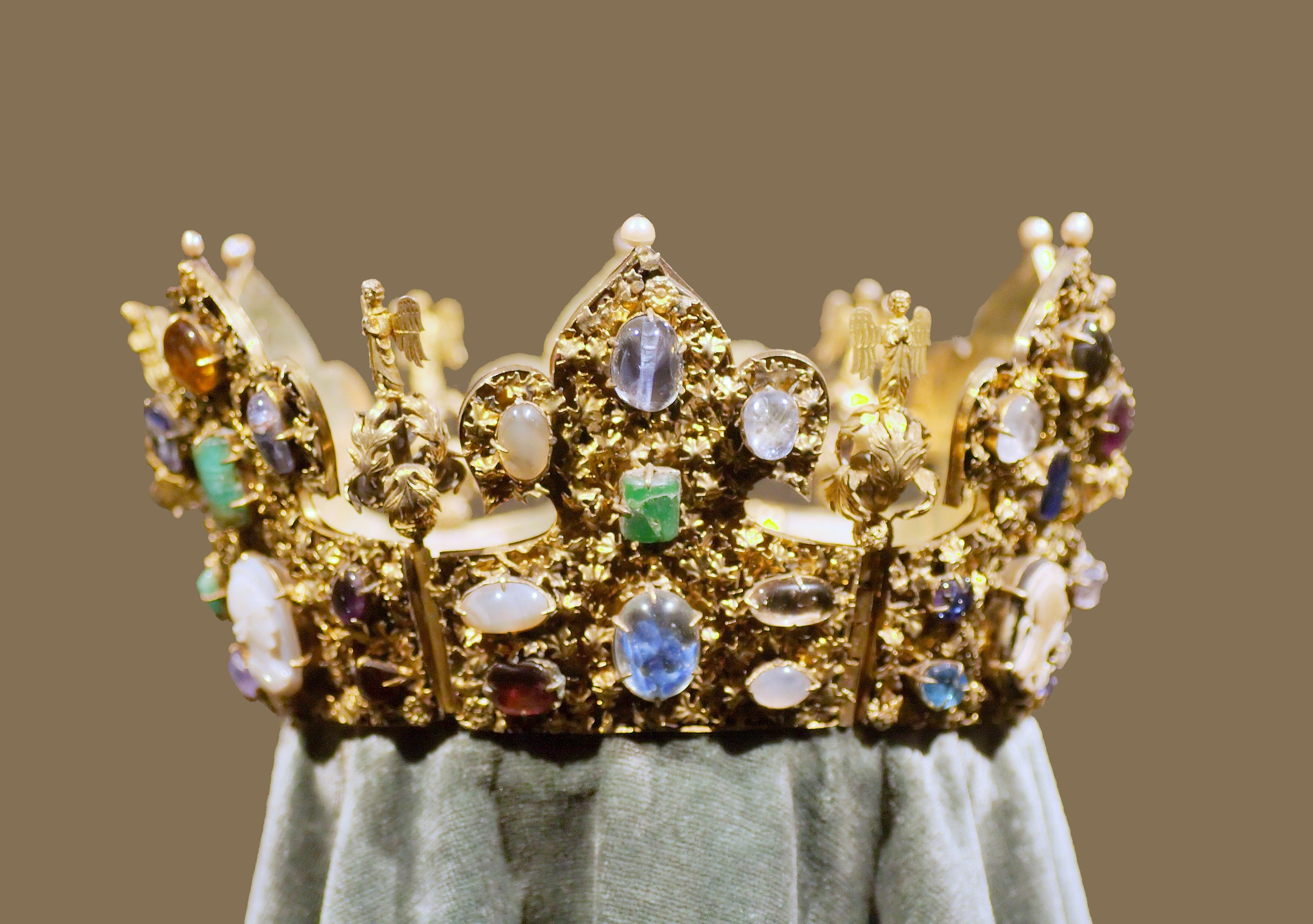
- The so-called crown of Henry II at the Treasury of Munich Residenz

Details
- Country: Germany
- Made: XIII century

The so-called Crown of Henry II is a medieval crown which came from the reliquary of the saint Henry II, Holy Roman Emperor (972–1024) at Bamberg Cathedral, though it is not thought to date from close to his lifetime. After the process of German Mediatisation, Bamberg became part of the Kingdom of Bavaria and the crown was transferred to the treasury of the Munich Residenz, where it still can be seen today.

This lily crown consists of six plates which are joined by hinges fixed with pins. Each of the plates carries a large fleur-de-lis. The pins are surmounted by praying angels standing on acanthus leaves. Four of the segments and all fleur-de-lis are adorned with precious stones while two carry antique cameos. The decoration of the frame with foliage work seems to be of later date than the frame. Due to fitting slots at the front and back segment it is possible to add an imperial arch and cross to the frame. One theory states that the crown was made for the reliquary in the 14th century but it may also be a crown of Frederick II that came into the possession of Bamberg Cathedral via Henry VII and Louis IV.
