= Munich Residenz =

Palace in Munich, Germany

Coordinates: 48°08′28″N 11°34′41″E

Munich Residenz

The Residenz (German: [ʁeziˈdɛnts]; 'Residence') in central Munich is the former royal palace of the Wittelsbach monarchs of Bavaria. The Residenz is the largest city palace in Germany and is today open to visitors for its architecture, room decorations, and displays from the former royal collections.

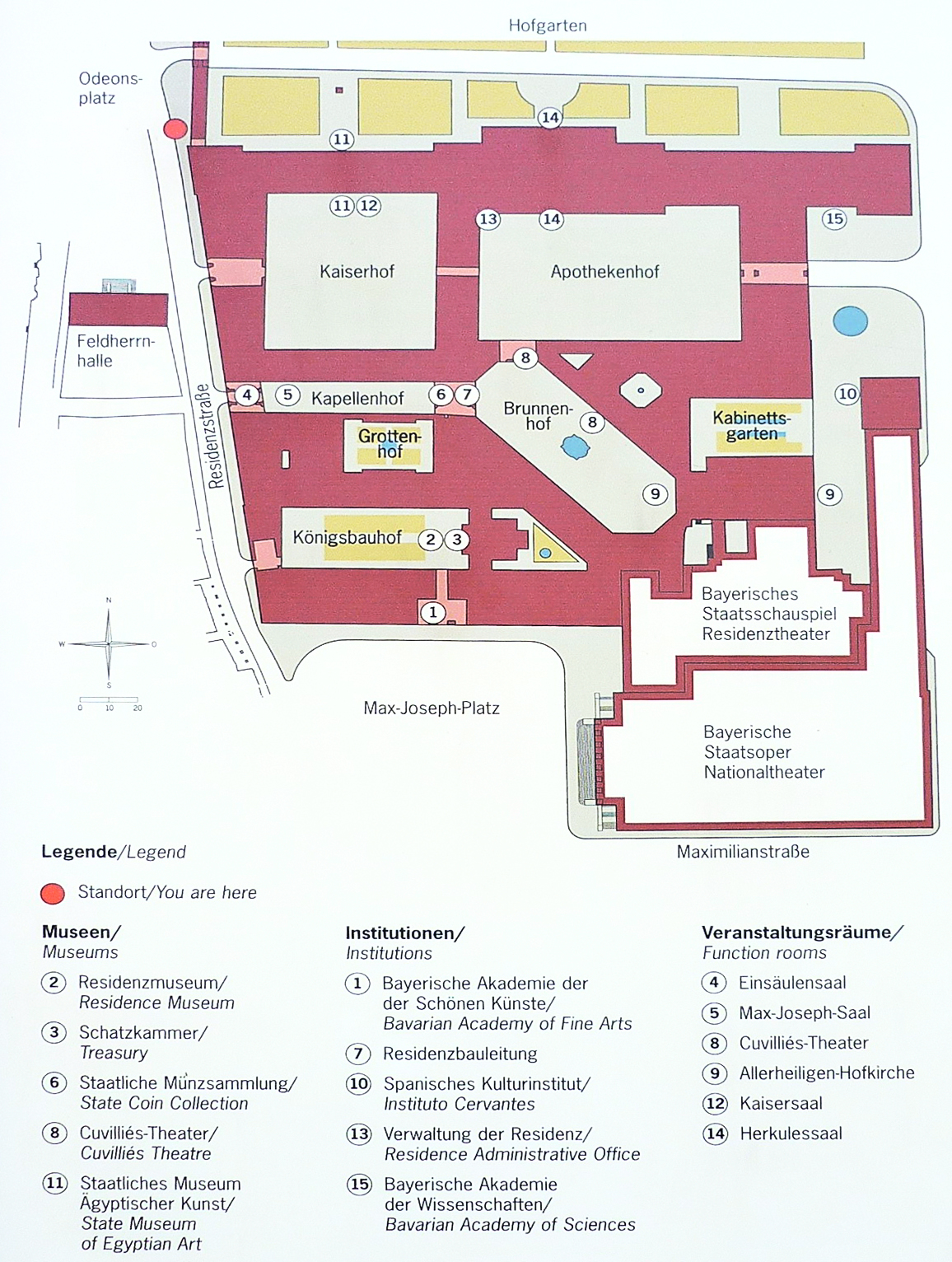
Plan of the Residenz

The complex of buildings contains ten courtyards and displays 130 rooms. The three main parts are the Königsbau (near the Max-Joseph-Platz), the Alte Residenz ('Old Residence'; towards Residenzstraße) and the Festsaalbau (towards the Hofgarten). A wing of the Festsaalbau contains the Cuvilliés Theatre since the reconstruction of the Residenz after World War II. It also houses the Herkulessaal ('Hercules Hall'), the primary concert venue for the Bavarian Radio Symphony Orchestra. The Byzantine Court Church of All Saints (Allerheiligen-Hofkirche) at the east side is facing the Marstall, the building for the former Court Riding School and the royal stables.

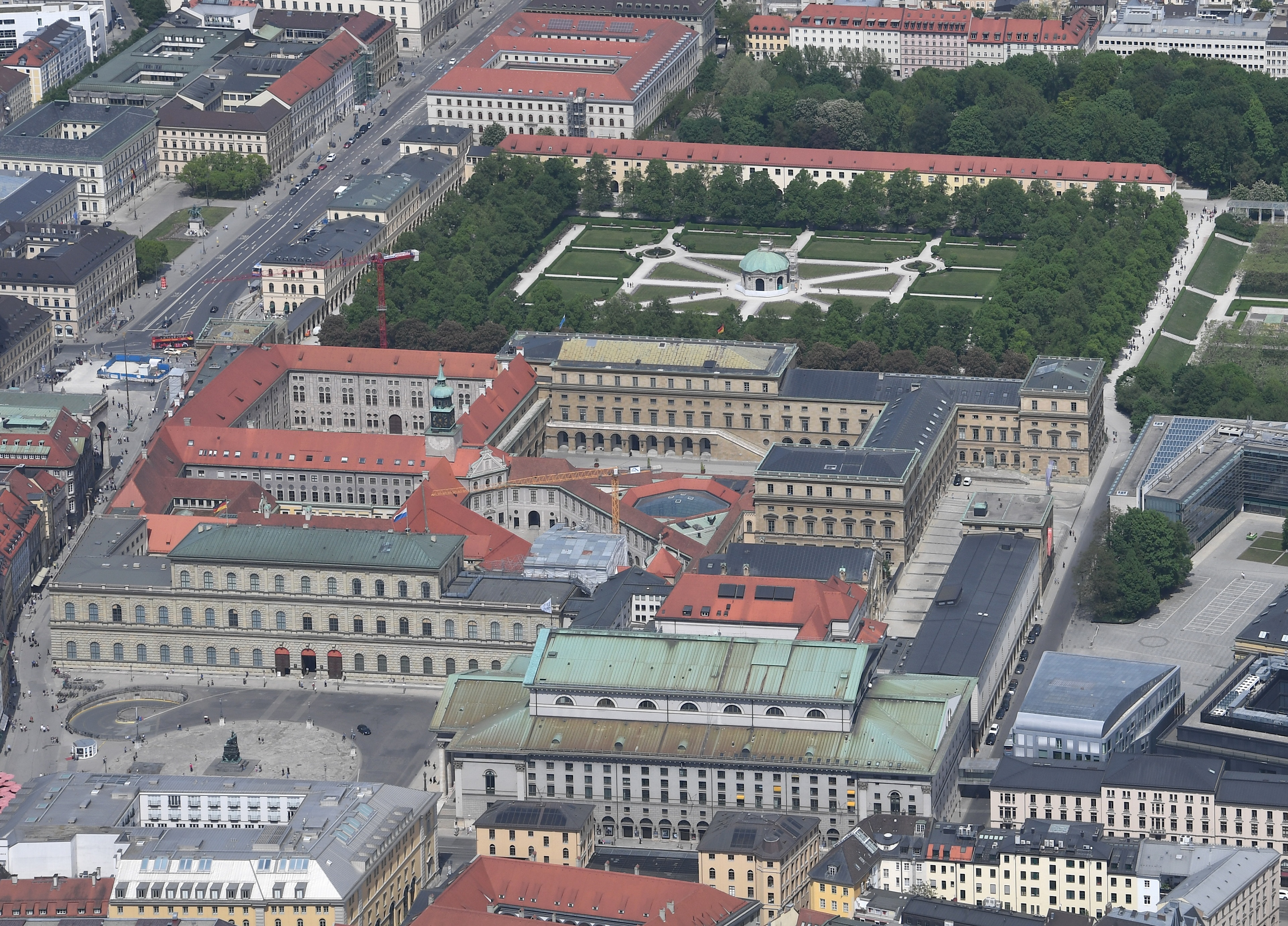
Aerial image of the Munich Residenz and the Hofgarten

== History and architecture ==
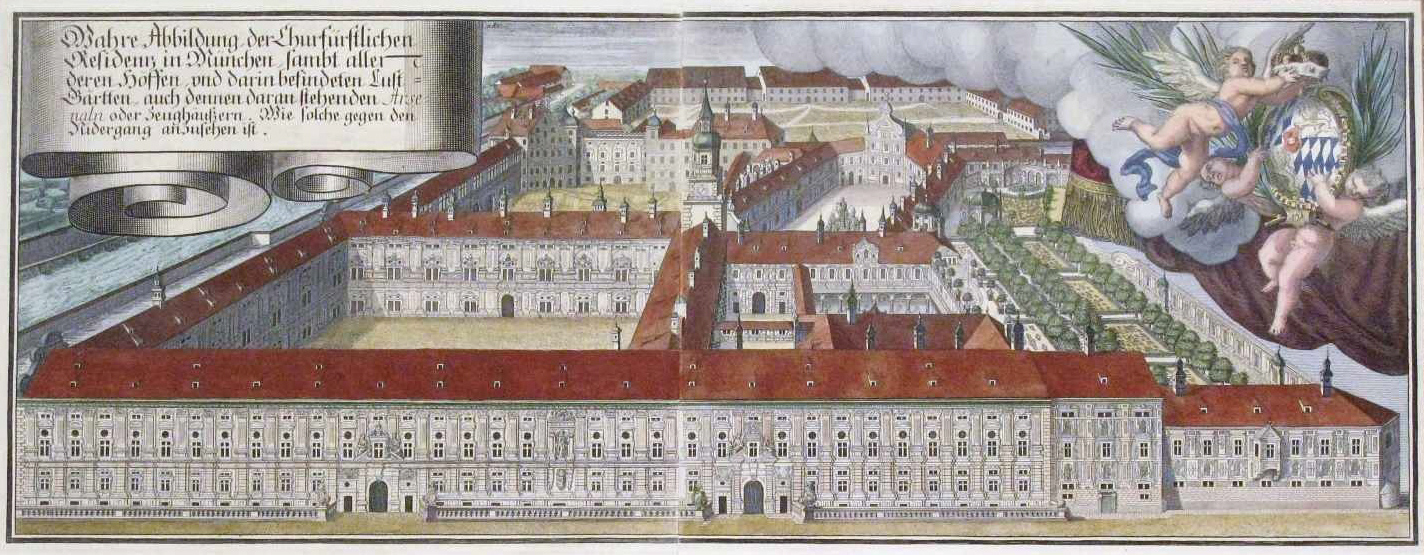
Munich Residenz in the 18th century

The first buildings at this site were erected in the year 1385 and were financed by the township of Munich as a sanction for a failed uprising against Stephen III (1375–1413) and his younger brothers. The Silver Tower (Silberturm), as the strongest bastion, was significantly situated next to the inner walls protecting the castle against the city. This sturdy new castle (Neuveste – new fortress), surrounded by wide moats and located at the very north eastern corner of the new double ring of town walls, replaced the difficult to defend Alter Hof (the Old Court) located in the middle of the town as residence of the Wittelsbach rulers. For the Dukes of the often divided country had felt the need to keep some distance from the frequently rebellious city dwellers at the one hand and for some defence against their warlike relatives at the other. As a result, they sought to build themselves a shelter impregnable and easy to leave (directly towards the glacis, without having to enter city lanes) at the same time. Around 1470, under Albert IV (1465–1508), the fortress walls and the gate in the north were built, followed by the construction of two turrets.

The Gothic foundation walls and the basement vaults of the old castle including the round pillars of the so-called ballroom cellar (Ballsaalkeller) are today the oldest surviving parts of the palace. The Residenz's development over the centuries did not take place only out of its main centre, the Neuveste, but in addition grew out of several single parts and extensions, the first of which used to be the Antiquarium. Finally, after more than four centuries of development, the giant palace had practically replaced a whole former city quarter with barracks, a monastery, houses and gardens. It assembles the styles of the late Renaissance, as well as of Baroque, Rococo and Neo-Classicism.

=== The Alte Residenz ===
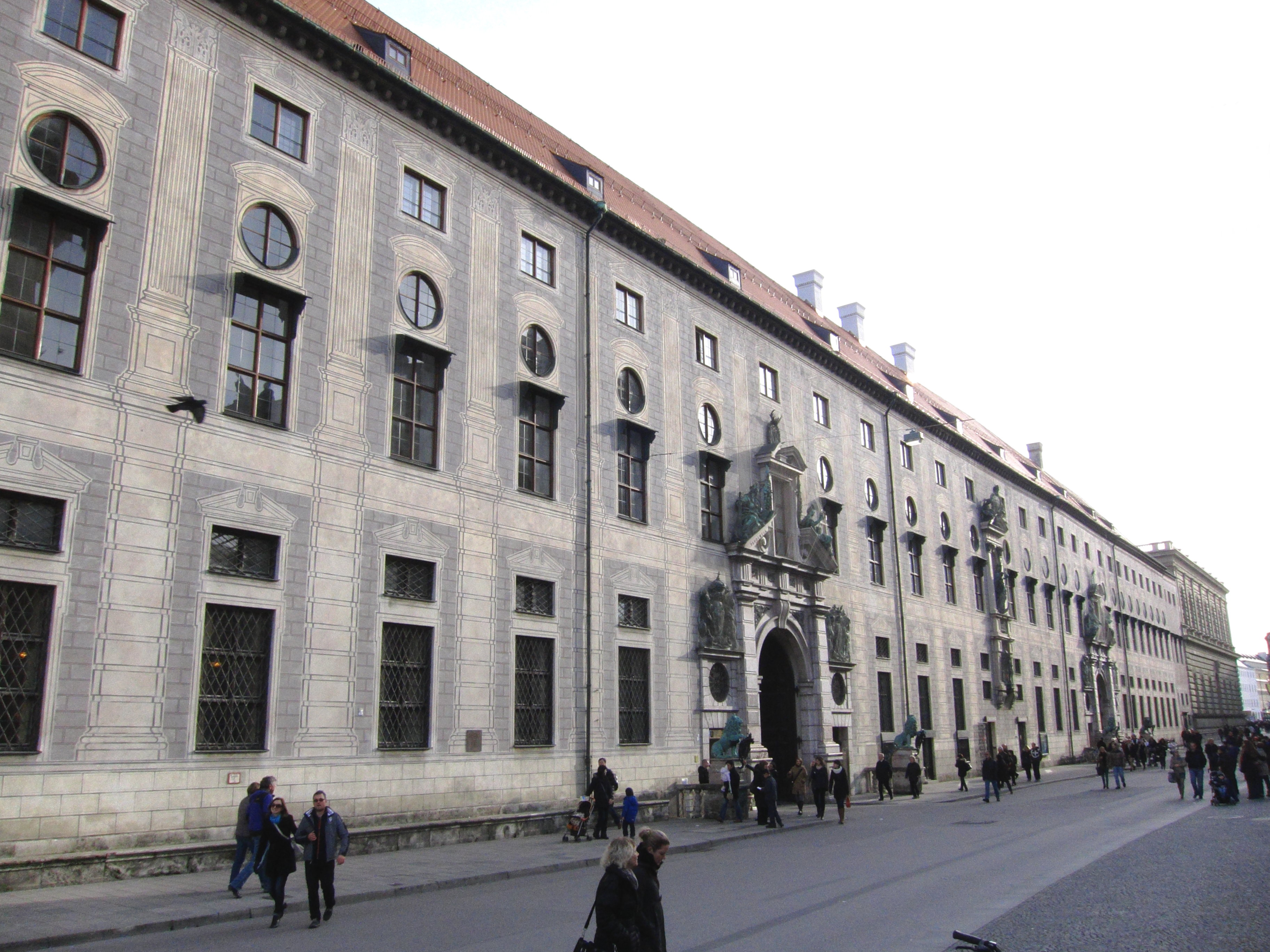
17th-century west wing

With the order of William IV (1508–1550) to expand the Neuveste with the so-called Rundstubenbau and to set up the first Court Garden, began the history of the Munich Residenz as a representative palace. To the history cycle of this garden pavilion belonged once also the Battle of Issus of Albrecht Altdorfer.

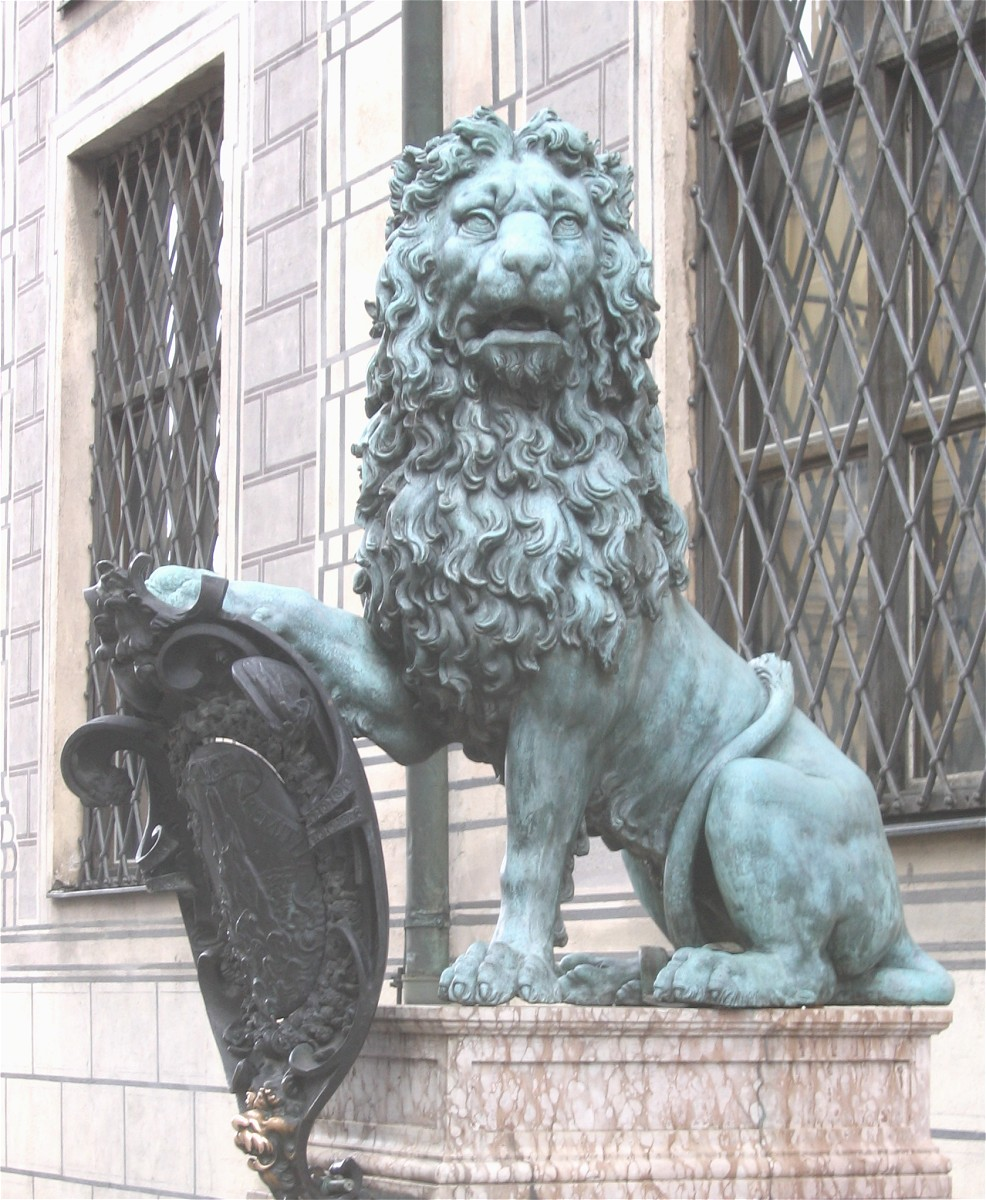
Lion in front of the Alte Residenz

Under Albert V (1550–1579) Wilhelm Egkl built next to a banqueting hall of the Neuveste (St. George Hall) an art chamber in the building of the former ducal stables and many collections in Munich originate from there. Since there was not enough space for the extensive collection of sculptures, the building for the Antiquarium was created 1568–1571. It had to be built outside the castle, as there was no place in the Neuveste.

William V (1579–1597) ordered the construction of the Witwenstock (Widow Wing) for the dowager Duchess Anna and in 1581–1586 the four wings of the Grottenhof. Friedrich Sustris was the architect. Around 1590 the construction of the Black Hall was begun to the southeast on the Antiquarium. Under direction of Sustris the Erbprinzentrakt (Prince Wing), north of the Witwenstock, was added.

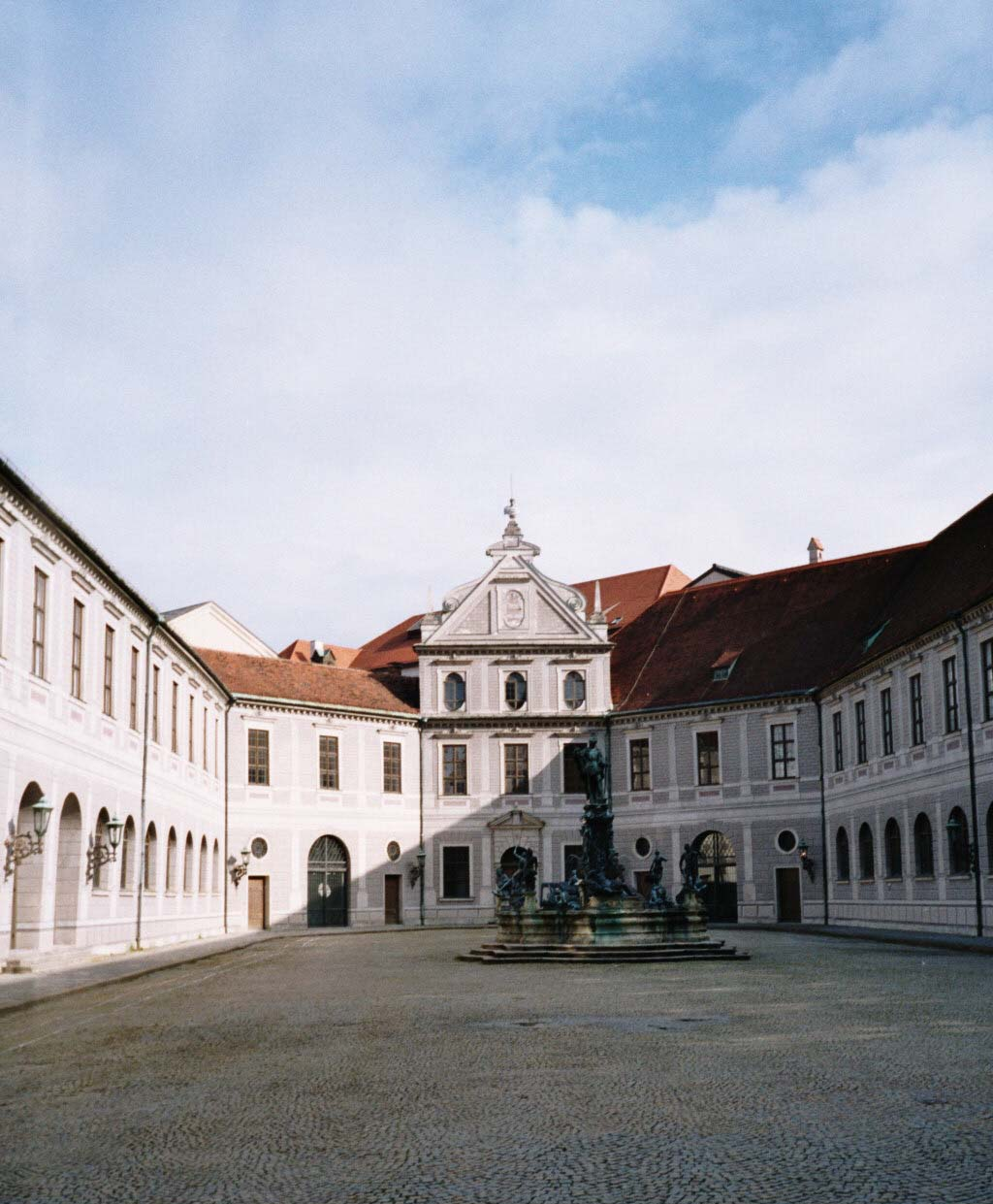
Brunnenhof (Fountain Courtyard), one of the ten courtyards

Maximilian I (1597–1651) commissioned what is now called the Maximilian Residenz (Maximilianische Residenz ), the west wing of the palace. Until the 19th century, it was the only publicly visible facade and it still is preserved. The portals are guarded by two lions and a statue of the Virgin Mary as patroness of Bavaria in a wall niche between the portals on the west side of the residence complex. Maximilian had rebuilt and connected the existing buildings. In addition, Maximilian I had from 1612 large parts of the south and west wings of the Neuveste with the Silver Tower demolished. Between 1611 and 1619, the wing at the large Emperor's Courtyard (Kaiserhof) was created to the north of the complex. It documents the high political claims of Maximilian.

Its large dimensions satisfied Maximilian's successors up to 18th century, who contented themselves with interior upgrading and smaller extensions such as the wing for the Grüne Galerie (1730) and the Residenz Theatre (1751).

=== Courtyards ===
Ten courtyards can be found inside the large complex: The Grotto Courtyard (Grottenhof) with the Perseus Fountain was built between 1581 and 1586 under William V (1579–1597) by Friedrich Sustris as the leading architect, and takes its name from the grotto on the western façade of the Antiquarium.

The octagonal Brunnenhof (Fountain Courtyard) served as a place for tournaments before the large Wittelsbach Fountain was erected in the middle of the courtyard in 1610. The buildings around the Kaiserhof (Emperor's Courtyard) with the Residenz Tower as clock tower, were erected from 1612 to 1618, in the reign of Maximilian I. Both courtyards are decorated with optical illusions on the facade, the same as the facade of the Alte Residenz.

The Königsbauhof (King's Building Courtyard) replaced a garden. At its eastern side the rococo facade of the Grüne Galerie (Green Gallery) is situated, designed by François Cuvilliés the Elder in of 1731–33.

Other courtyards are the Kapellenhof (Chapel Courtyard), the large Apothekenhof (Apothecary Courtyard) behind the Festsaalbau, the Puderhöfchen (Small Powder Courtyard), the Küchenhof (Kitchen Courtyard), the Kabinettsgarten (Cabinet Garden), and then finally the Zierhöfchen (Decorative Courtyard or Comité Courtyard).

=== The Königsbau ===
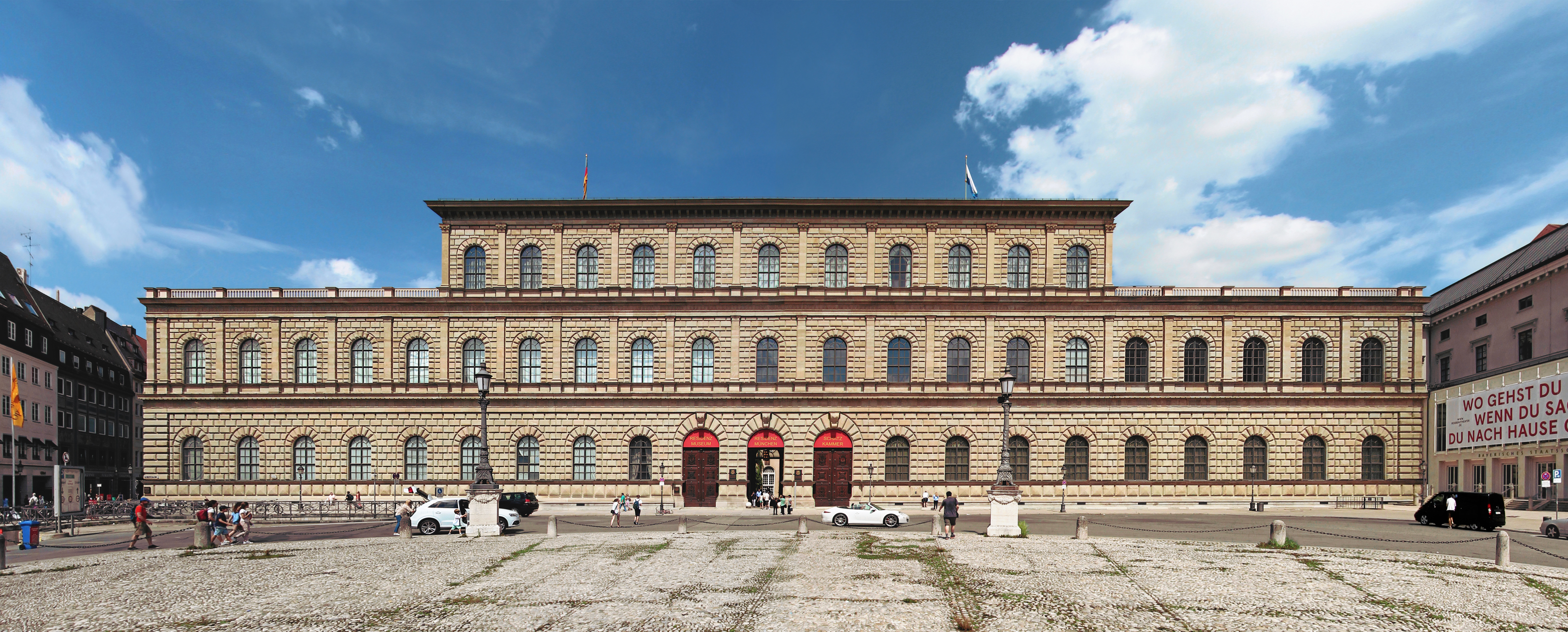
Munich Residenz, Königsbau (2014)

Today's building is from the time of King Ludwig I of Bavaria (1825–1848), who instructed his architect Leo von Klenze to extend the palace. Between 1825 and 1835 the King's building (Königsbau) was constructed to the south in the style of the Florentine Palazzo Pitti. The building is 30 meters high.

In the Königsbau are numerous suites of rooms, including the State Apartment of Ludwig I on the first floor and the Nibelungen Halls on the ground floor. Today also the Treasury is situated in the ground floor of the Königsbau. The royal living rooms are still preserved; they served primarily for the representation and could be visited by appointment already at that time. The actual private apartments of the royal couple on the back of Königsbau have not survived due to their destruction in World War II. On the second floor were the so-called Festgemächer, which were intended for minor court festivities. The spatial sequence was divided into lounge, reception salon, dance hall, flowers hall and private rooms for the king. These rooms are still preserved but in a highly simplified form and are now home to the Bavarian Academy of Fine Arts. From 2016 to 2018 the Yellow Staircase of Klenze was restored. Once it was the main entrance to the royal apartments in the Königsbau.

The Maximilian-Joseph Denkmal (King Maximilian-Joseph Memorial) at Max-Joseph-Platz (Maximilian-Joseph Square) stands in front of the Königsbau. It was created as a memorial for King Maximilian Joseph (1799–1825) by Christian Daniel Rauch and carried out by Johann Baptist Stiglmaier. It was only unveiled in 1835 as the king had rejected being depicted seated.

=== The Festsaalbau ===
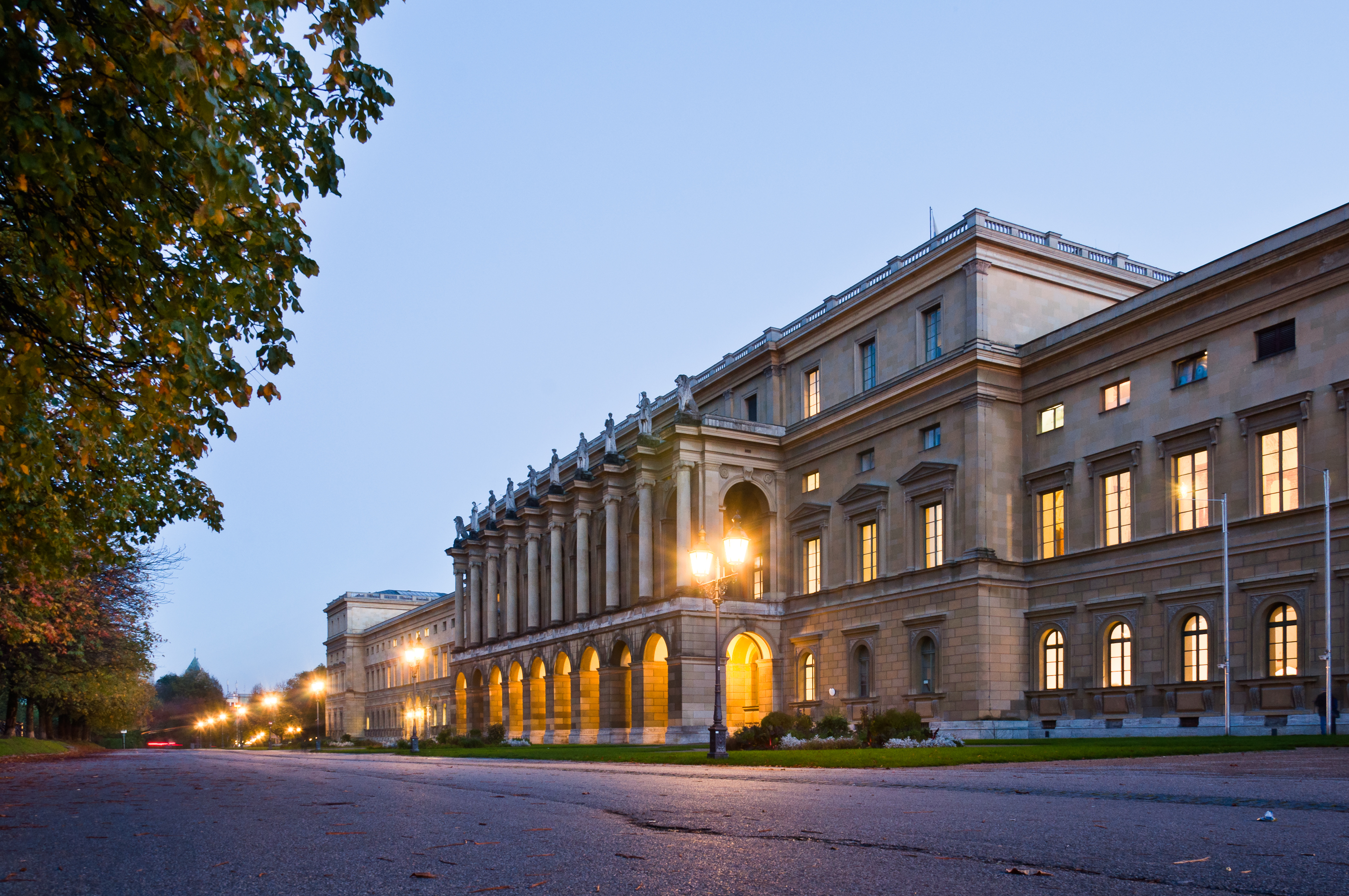
Festsaalbau of the Residenz

The neo-classical 250 metre long Banqueting Hall Wing (Festsaalbau) in the north section of the Residenz was added between 1832 and 1842 by Klenze under instructions from King Ludwig I. Here were located the Large Throne Room and the royal reception halls. One of the primary concert venues for the Bavarian Radio Symphony Orchestra is the Herkulessaal (Hercules Hall), which has replaced the destroyed Large Throne Room. The Festsaalbau today houses also the Bavarian Academy of Sciences and Humanities and the Cuvilliés Theatre (Old Residenz Theatre).

The Winter Garden was commissioned by King Ludwig II of Bavaria (1864–1886) around 1870. After the king's death, the Winter Garden on the roof of the Festsaalbau of the Residenz Palace was dismantled in 1897. The reason for this was due to water leaking from the ornamental lake through the ceiling of the rooms below. Photographs and sketches still record this incredible creation which included a grotto, a Moorish kiosk, an Indian royal tent, an artificially illuminated rainbow and intermittent moonlight.

=== The Old Residenz Theatre ===
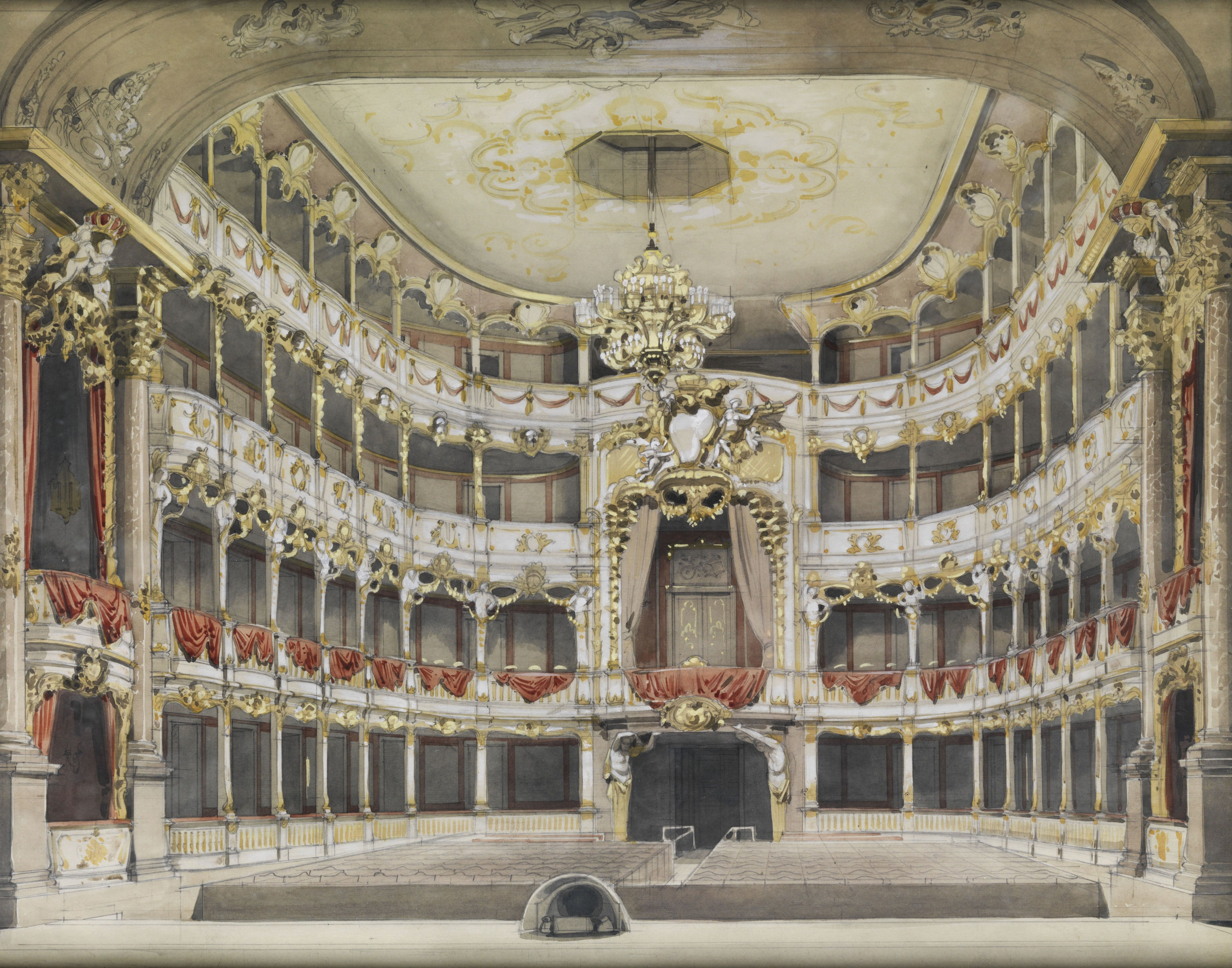
The Cuvilliés Theatre (Old Residenz Theatre)

The building of the Residenz Theatre, next to the church, was constructed already under Elector Maximilian III (1745–1777) from 1751. Before World War II, it housed the Old Residenz Theatre. The decoration of the old theatre, carefully dismantled and removed, was moved into the south-eastern wing of the Festsaalbau next to the Allerheiligen-Hofkirche after the war. Here it was reopened as Cuvilliés Theatre. In 2008, the courtyard before the theatre was also redesigned and covered with a new glass roof. It was then named Comité Courtyard after the Comité Cuvilliés, an initiative that made the renovation of the theatre possible by collecting donations.

=== The Allerheiligen-Hofkirche ===
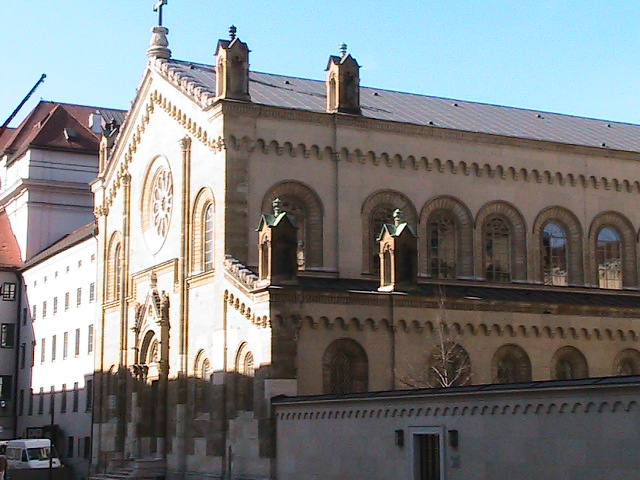
Allerheiligen-Hofkirche next to the Residenz Theatre

The Allerheiligen-Hofkirche (Court Church of All Saints) on the eastern side of the Residenz was commissioned in 1825 by King Ludwig I. It was inspired by the Cappella Palatina, the richly decorated Byzantine royal chapel in Palermo. As bombs destroyed all but the outer walls in 1944 and its rich interior ornament was almost completely lost. The church is now used for concerts and events.

=== The Marstall ===
Facing the church, the Marstall, the building for the former Court Riding School (Hofreitschule) was erected under King Maximilian Joseph by Klenze between 1817 and 1822. The construction of the monumental portal arch, surmounted by busts of Castor and Pollux, is considered one of the most mature early works of Klenze. The extensive buildings for the royal stables no longer exist. From 1923 the Marstall housed the Marstallmuseum which was in 1941 moved into Nymphenburg Palace. Today the building serves as the scenery house, workshop building and study stage of the Residenz Theatre.

=== Opening to public and World War II damage ===
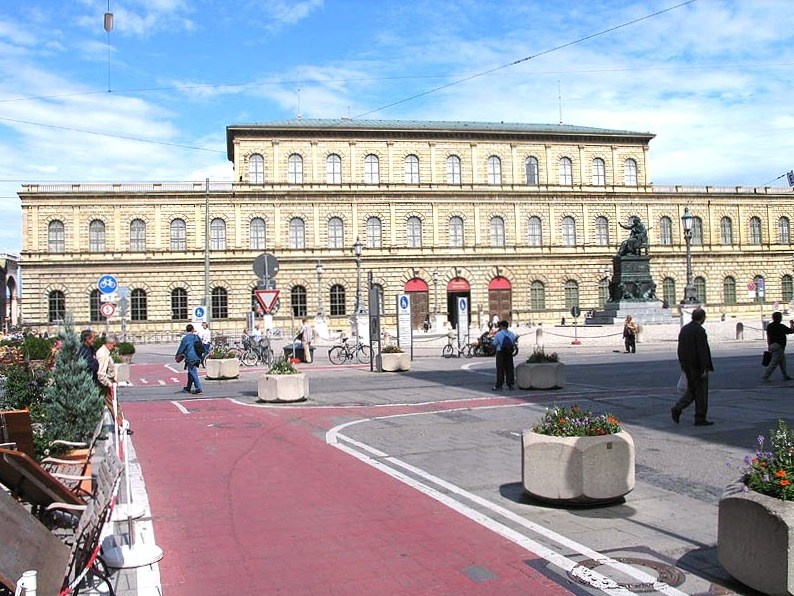
Königsbau facade

Prince Regent Luitpold (1886–1912) ordered the rebuilding of the Stone Rooms for his purposes as he did not want to live in the apartments of the King. During his time, the new Treasury, designed by Julius Hofmann, was created. Today it forms the entrance to the counter area. King Ludwig III (1912–1918) occupied the palace for only a short period before the revolution of 1918. He first moved like his father, into the Stone Rooms at the Kaiserhof tract, and later into the Königsbau. Now technical upgrades such as central heating and electric lighting were made, which the Prince Regent still rejected. In addition, the Nibelungen Halls were used by Queen Maria Theresa, to create with other women items for Bavarian soldiers during World War I.

As early as the reign of King Ludwig I, interested citizens could by appointment (when the royal couple were not living in the Residenz) visit the Königsbau. Under Prince Regent Luitpold, it was possible to visit all the unused parts of the palace and the Old Treasury. In 1897 the first guide book for the Residenz in Munich was published. After the revolution of 1918, the Residenz became a public museum.

The palace was severely damaged by bombing during World War II. Most of its rooms were reconstructed by the 1980s. Some of the buildings, however, were rebuilt in a simplified manner. Examples of this are the facade of the Alte Residenz on Residenzstrasse or the Arcades in front of the former throne hall on the first floor of the Festsaalbau. A substantial loss was caused by the destruction of the neo-classical rooms and halls in the Festssalbau (including the Grand Throne Hall, now the Hercules Concert Hall, and the Grand Stairway), of the rich décor of the Papal Rooms including the ceiling of the Golden Hall and of the apartment of King Ludwig II (1864–1886). The frescoes of the Court Church of All Saints were also completely destroyed.

Restoration of historic interiors continues, most recently with the Yellow Staircase in the Konisgsbau, with work completed in 2021.

== Inside the palace ==
=== Residenz Museum ===
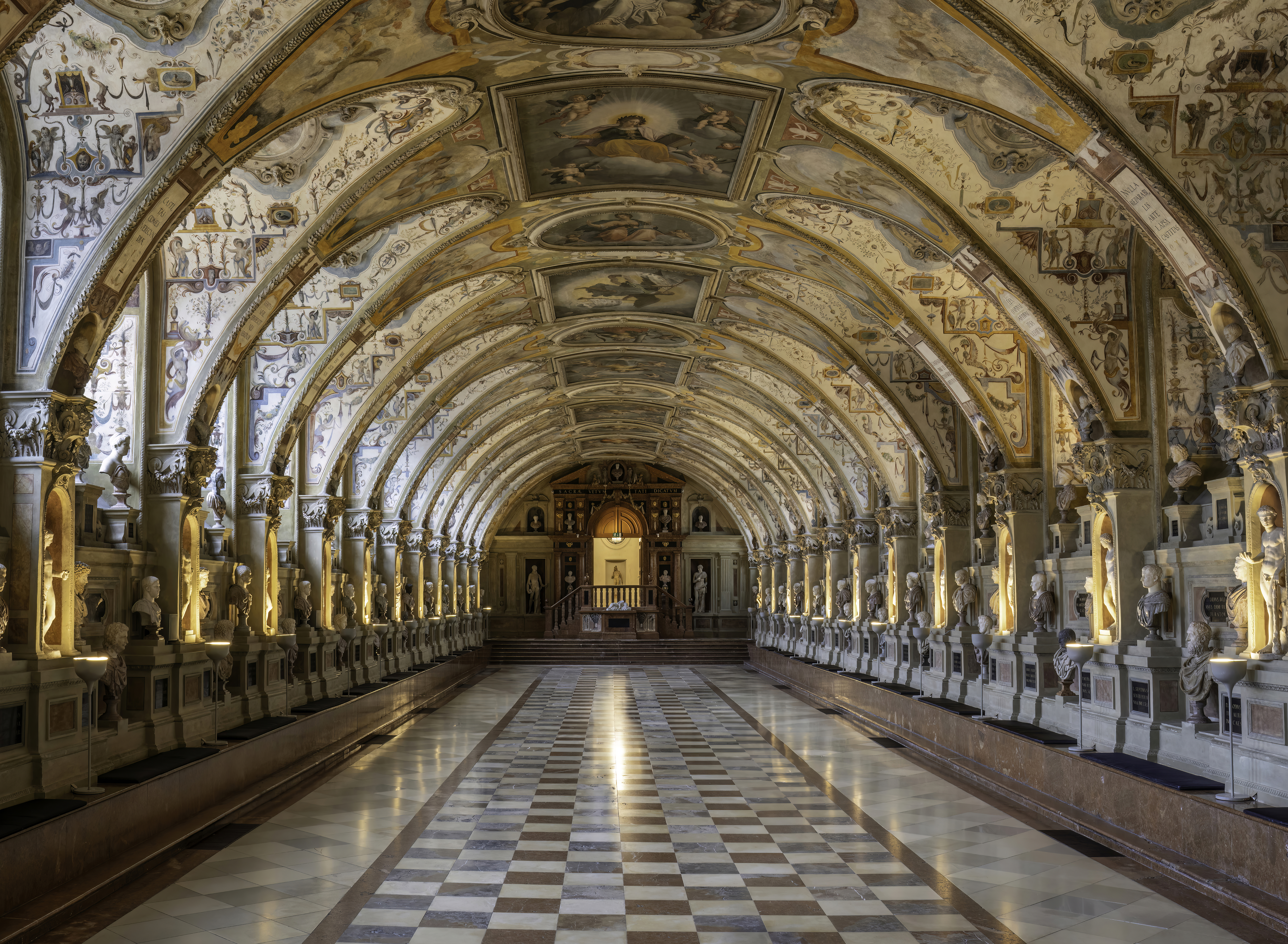
The Renaissance Antiquarium of the Residenz

The Hall of Antiquities (Antiquarium), built between 1568 and 1571 for the antique collection of Duke Albert V (1550–1579) by Wilhelm Egkl and Jacobo Strada, is the largest Renaissance hall north of the Alps. It was remodelled into a banqueting hall by Friedrich Sustris in 1586–1600. The Antiquarium housed the Ducal Library until 1581. The low hall was then covered with a barrel vault that had 17 window lunettes. The hall was adorned with paintings by Peter Candid, Antonio Ponzano, and Hans Thonauer the Elder, though some were initially designed by Sustris himself. The Court Chapel (Hofkapelle), the Emperor's Staircase (Kaisertreppe) and Imperial Hall (Kaisersaal), the Stone Rooms (Steinzimmer; 1612–1617; general design by Hans Krumpper) and the Trier Rooms (Trierzimmer); ceiling frescoes by Peter Candid) built for Elector Maximilian I are typical examples from the early 17th century.

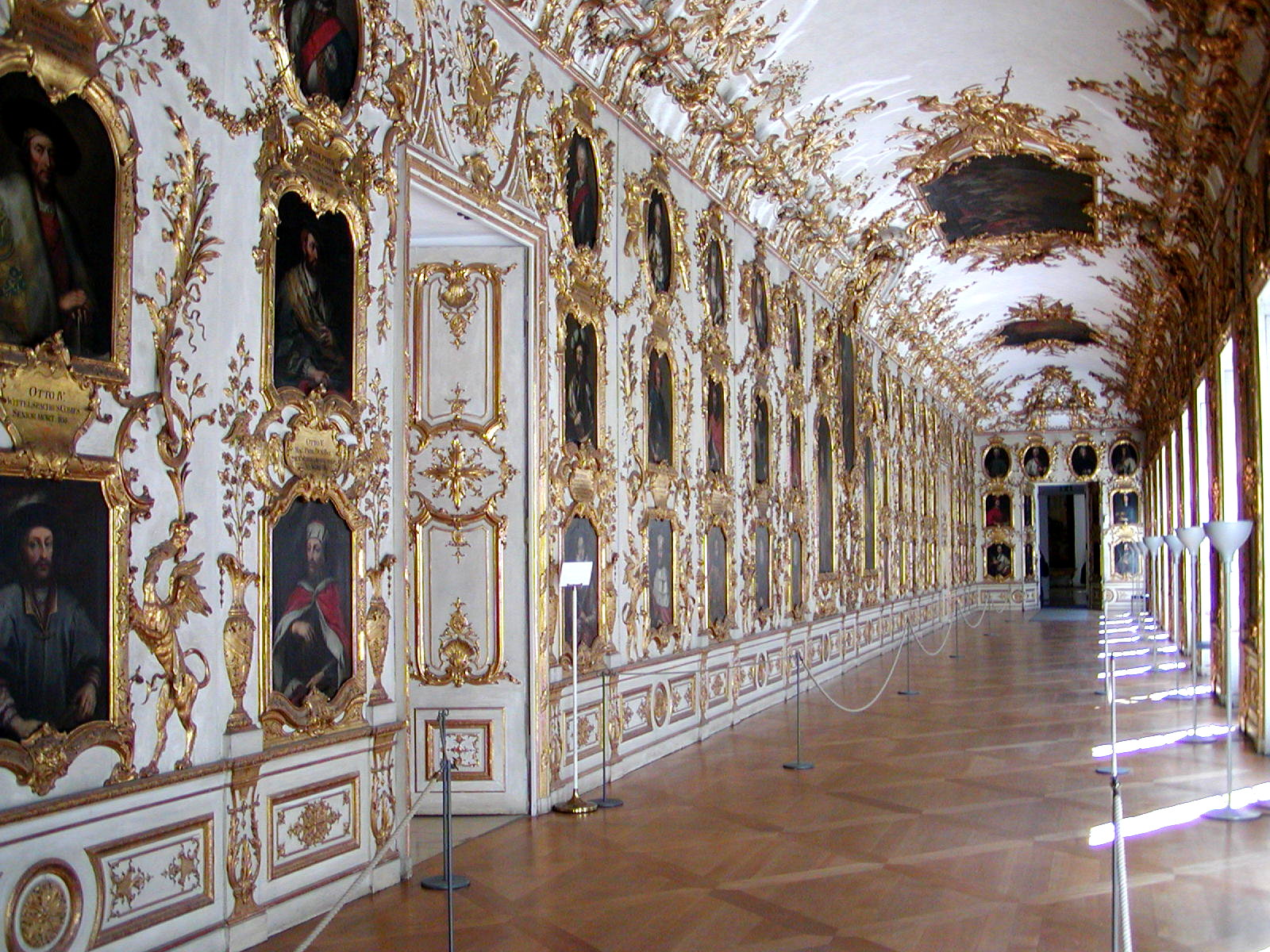
The Rococo Ancestral Gallery

The Baroque era is represented by the Papal Rooms (Päpstlichen Zimmer), erected under his son Elector Ferdinand Maria (1651–1679). Pope Pius VI lived here during his visit in Munich in 1782. As a result, the rooms were named after him. The extensions of Elector Maximilian II Emanuel (1679–1726), especially the Alexander room and Summer room, are representative living rooms. They were altered not long after his death. The remains were destroyed during the residence fire of 1729.

The Ancestral Gallery (Ahnengallerie; 1726–1731) along with the Porcelain Cabinet (both constructed by Joseph Effner) and the Ornate Rooms (Reichen Zimmer) designed by François de Cuvilliés for Charles Albert (1726–1745), are magnificent examples of the court Rococo style. The rich decoration was executed by Johann Baptist Zimmermann, Joachim Dietrich and Wenzeslaus Miroffsky. The two-storey exterior façade of the Green Gallery (Grüne Gallerie) with its seven arched windows facing the courtyard of the Königsbau is a masterpiece of Cuvilliés. The Green Gallery, named after the wall covering made of green silk damask, was not only a ballroom, but also a gallery for paintings and mirrors. The magnificent Bedchamber (Paradeschlafzimmer) served as the place for the electoral dressing procedure. Thus all the structures erected by the court architects Joseph Effner and François de Cuvilliés served only the glorification of the House of Wittelsbach and the attainment of the imperial crown, which ultimately succeeded in 1742. In January 1745, Charles Albert died as Emperor Charles VII in the Residenz, which was thus also for a short time the imperial palace of the Holy Roman Empire. In the times of Elector Maximilian III (1745–1777) the rococo Apartments of the Prince Elector (Kurfürstenzimmer) were constructed between 1746 and 1763. Cuvilliés and Johann Baptist Gunetzrhainer were responsible for the work.

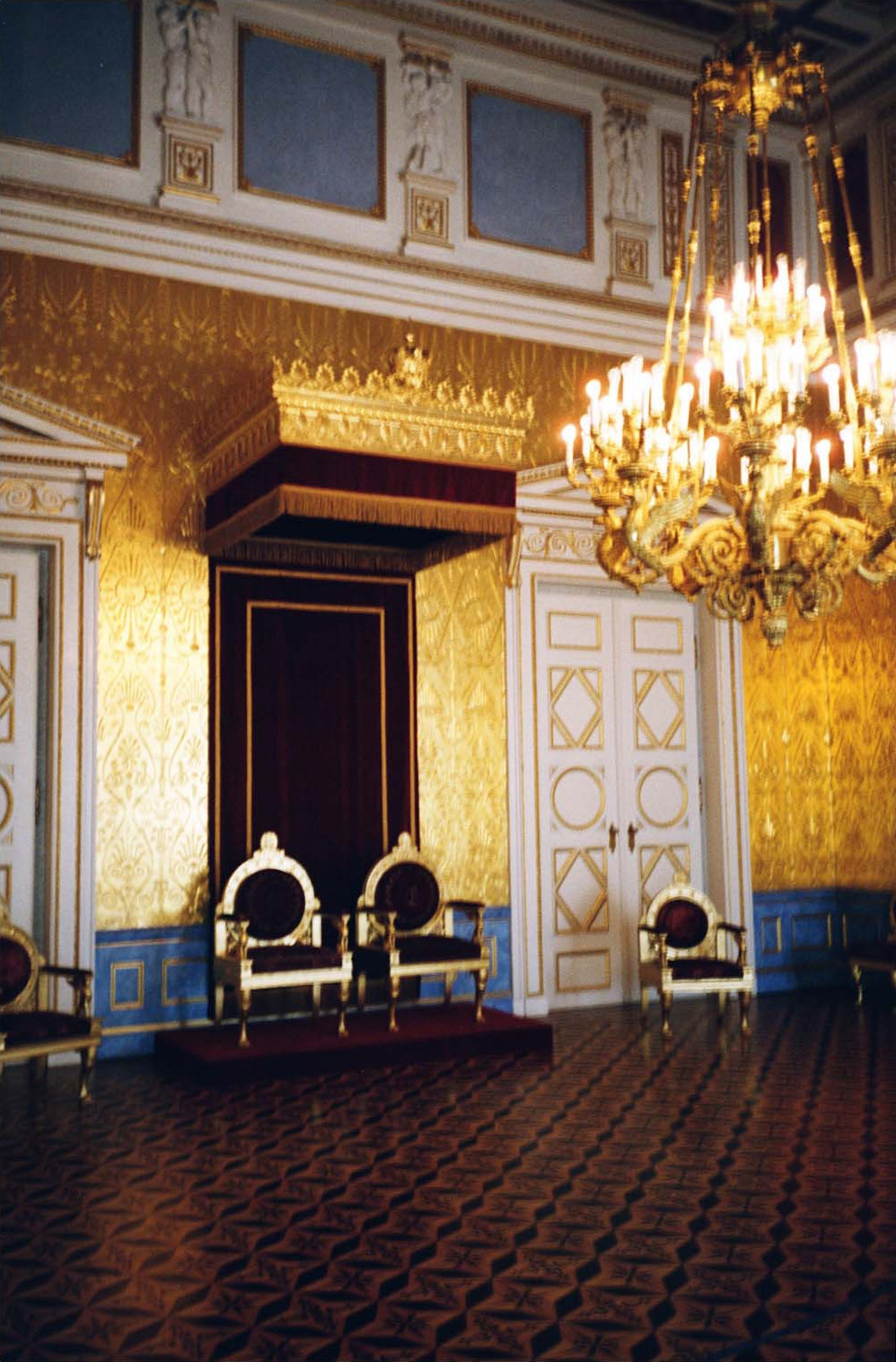
The Neoclassical Small Throne Room of the Kings of Bavaria

The Neo-classical epoch is represented by the Charlotte Rooms (Charlottenzimmer), the Royal Apartments and the Halls of the Battles (Schlachtensäle) in the Königsbau. The wall and ceiling paintings are by Julius Schnorr von Carolsfeld in the Nibelungensäle (Nibelungen Halls; 1827–1834). They are the first monumental representations of the Nibelungenlied Nibelungen Saga of Songs. The actual private chambers of the royal couple at the back of the Königsbau no longer survive as they were destroyed in World War II. Leo von Klenze was not only responsible for the architecture, but also designed the floors, the wall paintings and all the furniture. In the Festsaalbau were spacious halls that contained the Grand Throne Room in the centre, the Imperial halls, the ballroom and the Battle Hall in the north-eastern pavilion. These facilities were intended only for state occasions and were only accessible by a grand staircase which no longer exists. Here the most important royal ceremonies were held, surrounded by twelve colossal statues sculpted by Ferdinand von Miller, representing the main Bavarian rulers.

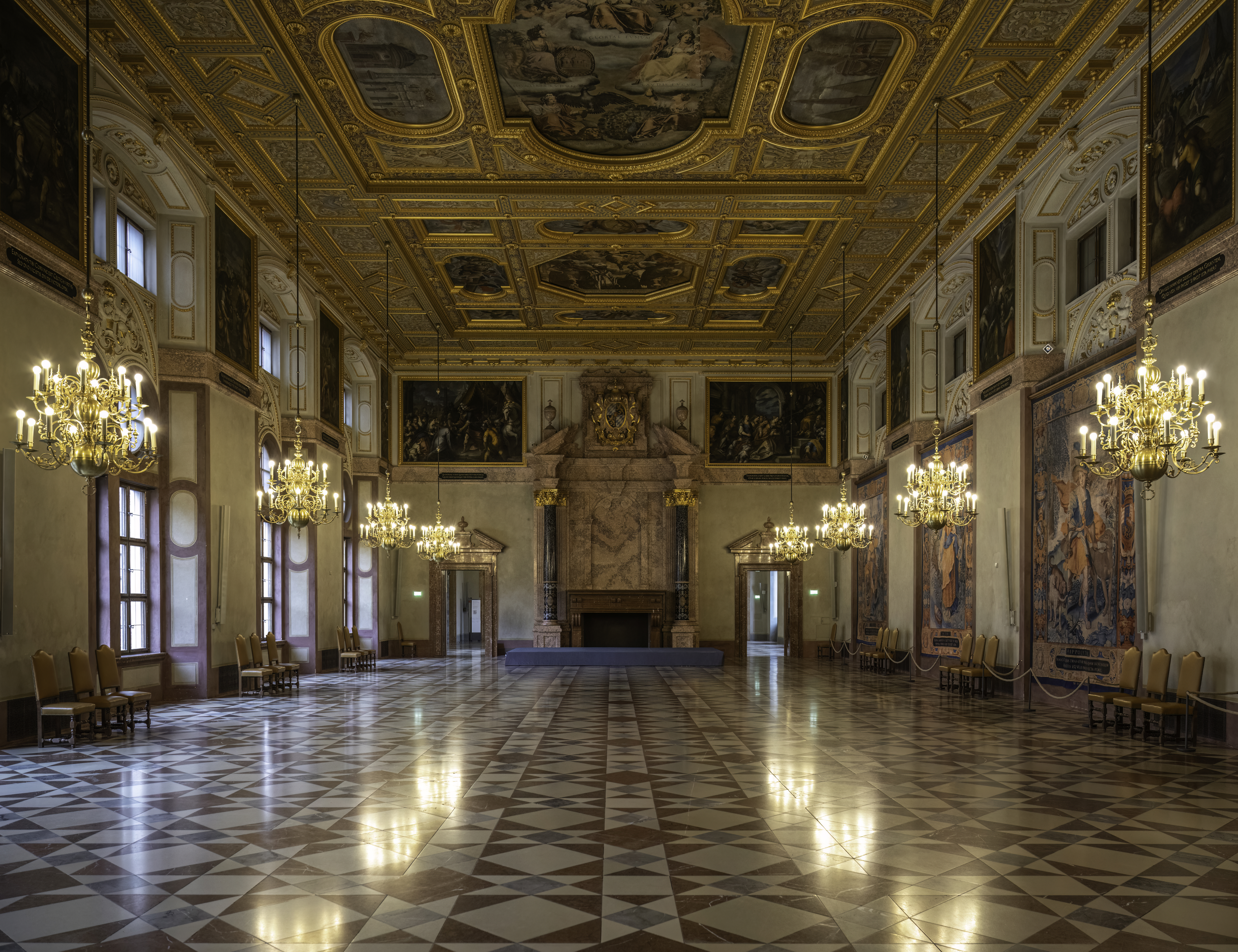
The Emperor’s Hall (reconstructed in 1985)

In addition to the rich accumulation of furniture, paintings and sculptures, today the museum contains bronze work, clocks, tapestries, porcelain and several special collections such as masterpieces of bronze art, European miniatures and liturgical vestments. The Wittelsbach dynasty porcelain collection includes items from their own Nymphenburg Porcelain Factory as well as from such famous porcelain producers such as Sèvres in France and Royal Porcelain from Berlin. The Wittelsbach East Asian collection includes over 500 pieces of porcelain and some paintings. In the Royal Silver Chambers, valuable pieces are housed. The collection of relics of the Munich Residenz come from the era of the Counter-Reformation. In the Festsaalbau bronze sculptures from the late 16th and early 17th centuries are presented, one of the richest collections of European bronze art from the Mannerism and early Baroque eras.

=== The Treasury ===
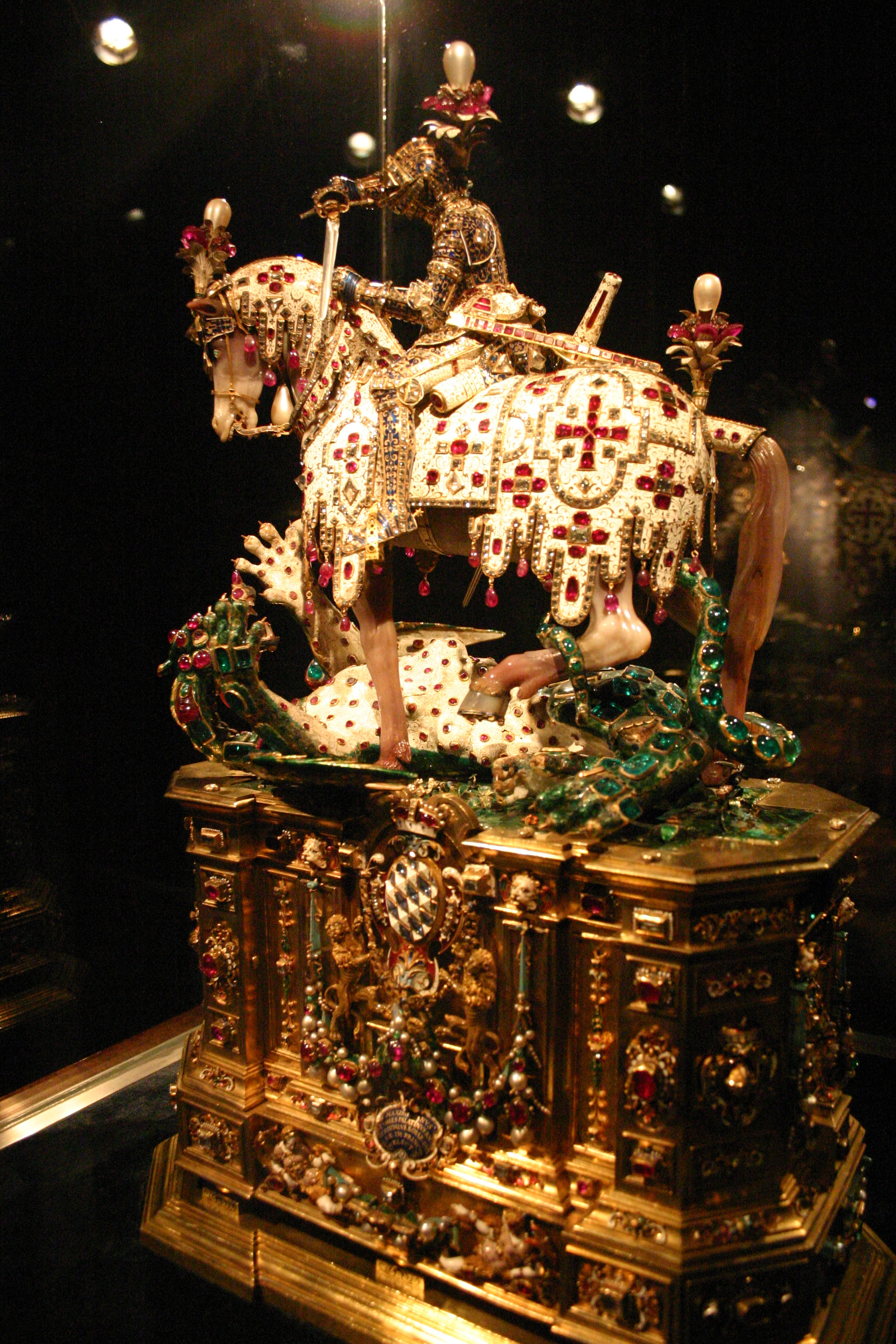
Renaissance Saint George's statue

Founded by Duke Albert V the Treasury houses the jewels of the Wittelsbach dynasty. This display in the Schatzkammer (Treasury) is contained in ten halls in the eastern wing of the Königsbau. The collection is one of the most important in the world and spans 1,000 years from the early Middle Ages to Neo-classicism. Royal insignia, crowns, swords, goblets, goldsmith works, rock crystal, ivory work, icons and numerous other treasures like precious tableware and toiletries are presented.

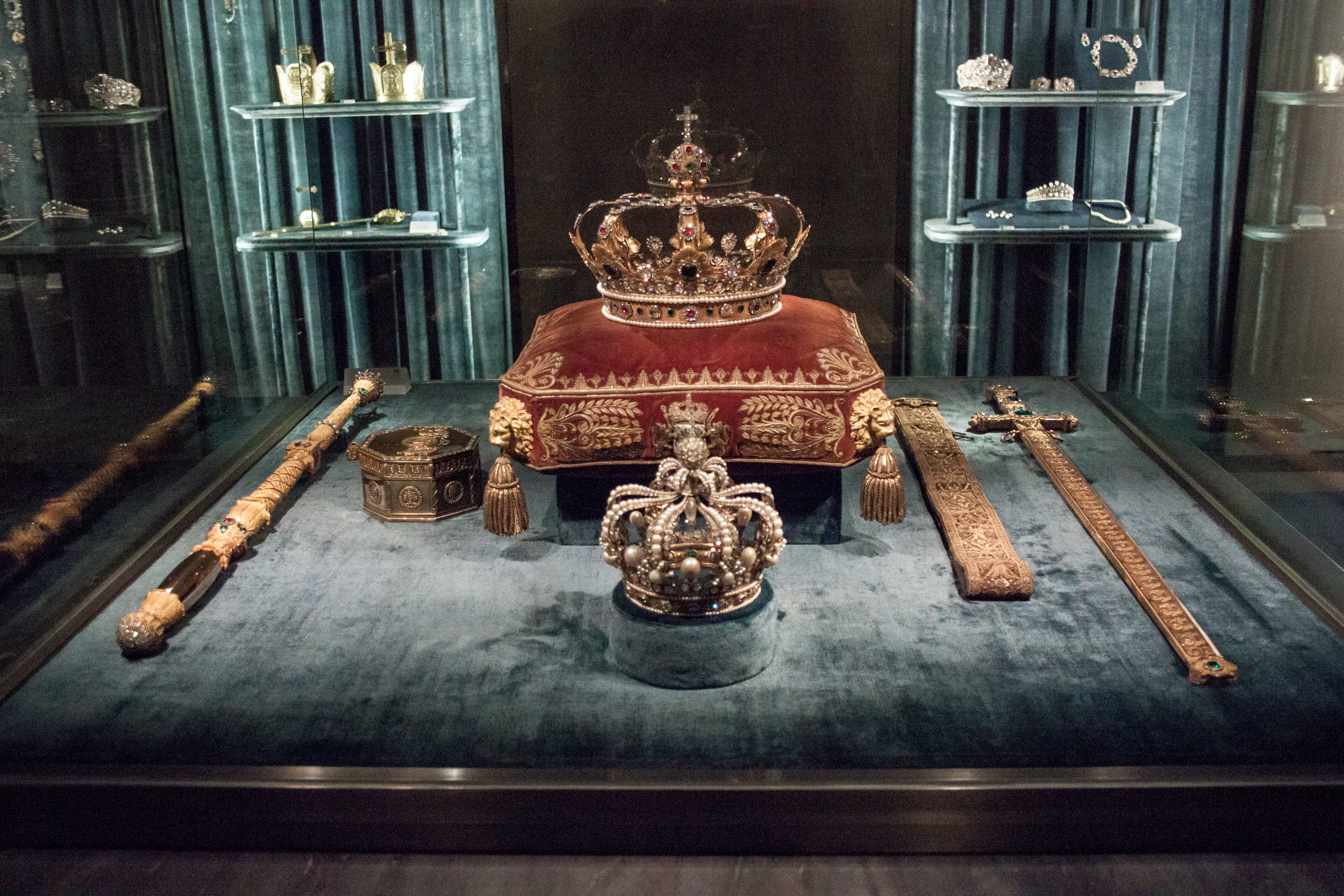
Royal regalia of Bavaria (1807) inside the treasury)

Among the exhibits are Emperor Charles the Bald's prayer-book from around 860, the altar-ciborium of Emperor Arnulf of Carinthia from around 890, the crown of the Empress Cunigunde, reliquary of the True Cross which belonged to the Emperor Henry II, a cross which belonged to Queen Gisela, all from around 1000, the Reliquary Crown of Henry II from around 1270, an English Queen's crown from around 1370 (the oldest surviving crown of England that came to the palatinate line of the house of Wittelsbach as the dowry of Blanche of England, the daughter of King Henry IV of England), the famous Statuette of St George (Munich, ca. 1599), the insignia and orders of the Bavarian monarchs, including crowns and insignia of the Emperor Charles VII (1742), the Crown of Bavaria (1807), ceremonial swords and ruby jewellery which belonged to Queen Therese, as well as a precious set of matching dishes served the French Empress Marie Louise during her journeys. Non-European art and craftwork, including Chinese porcelain, ivories from Ceylon and captured Turkish daggers are also on display.

=== The coin collection ===
The Residenz houses the Bavarian state coin collection, the Staatliche Münzsammlung. It was found by Duke Albert V. By the accession of Elector Palatine Charles Theodore (1777–1799), the Palatine and the Electoral Bavarian collection were combined. During the Napoleonic era many monastic coin collections came into the care of the Bavarian state. Crown Prince Ludwig, later King Ludwig I, had much enthusiasm for Ancient Greek coins and spent a lot of time examining the collection. In the first three decades of the 20th century, the collection was extended to house the Renaissance coins, medals and insignia. In 1963, the current exhibition rooms were opened in the Munich Residenz. With more than 300,000 coins, medals and banknotes from the ancient world to the present time, it is one of the world's leading collections.

== Hofgarten ==
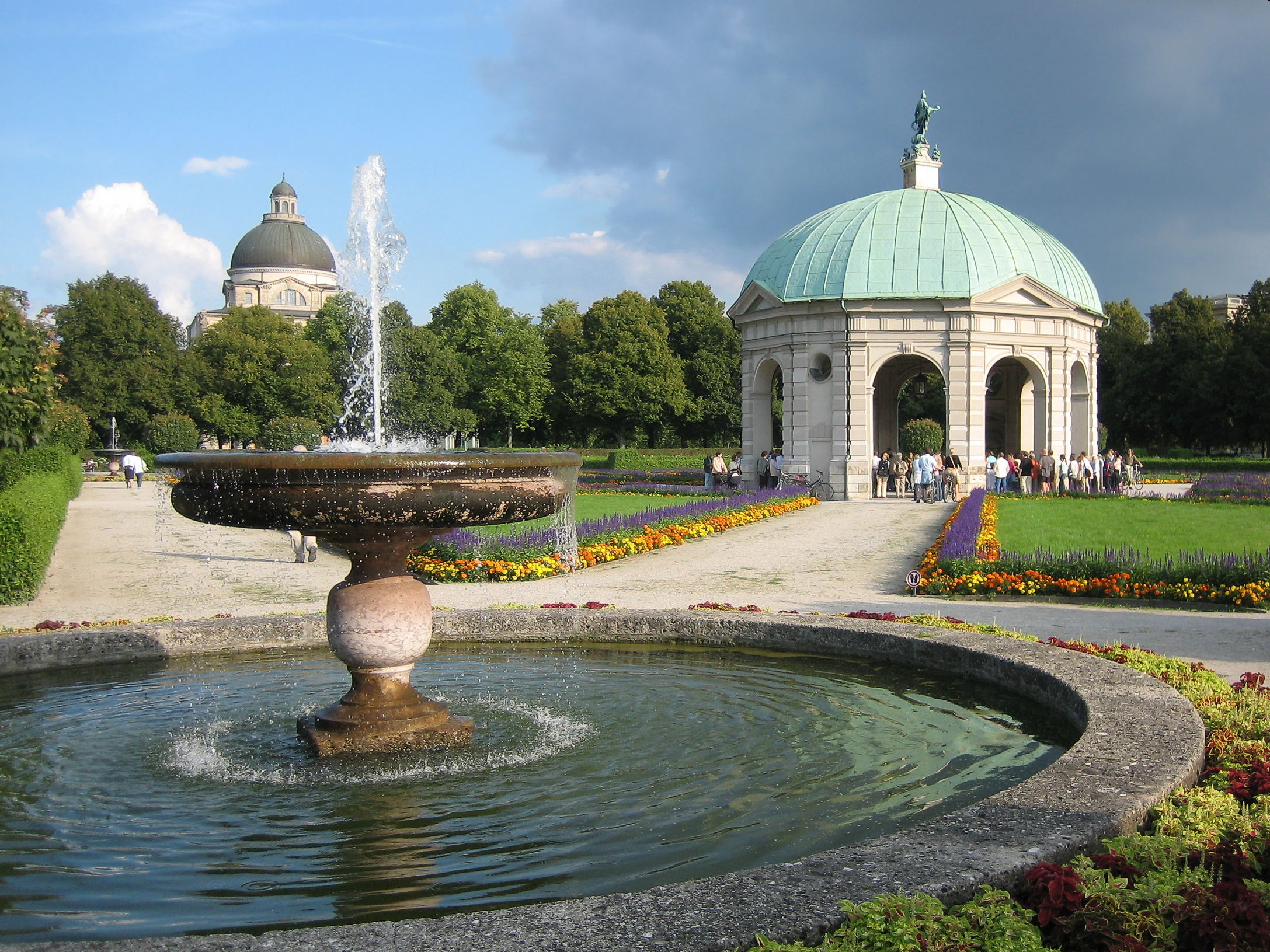
Hofgarten temple and fountain

The Hofgarten (Court Garden) is located at the northern side of the Residenz opposite to the Festsaalbau. It was laid out under King Maximilian I. In the middle of the park in French style is a circular temple built in 1615, crowned by a statue of Bavaria created in 1594 by Hubert Gerhard. The western Hofgarten arcades with the gate (Hofgartentor) were executed by Klenze. The northern wing includes the former electoral gallery building which was built by court architect Karl Albert von Lespilliez in 1780/81, today home of a theatre museum (Deutsches Theatermueum).

The remnants of some renaissance arcades in the north east of the park were integrated into the Bavarian State Chancellery in 1992. The people of Munich love to denounce it as the 'Straussoleum', named after a former state Premier who commissioned it, or even 'Munich White House', in reference to the long and hard fights that prevented the state government from erecting three giant wings instead of one. These wings it was claimed would have destroyed the overall impression of the court gardens. Its middle section with the a reconstructed dome are the only surviving sections of the former Bavarian Army Museum, constructed between 1900 and 1905 and almost completely destroyed during the bombing raids of World War II. The museum is now located in the Neues Schloss (New Palace) in Ingolstadt, around 80 kilometres north of Munich.

== Tourism ==
The Munich Residence and its museums have received more than 300,000 visitors per year, similar to the Nymphenburg Palace and ahead of Schleissheim Palace, but clearly behind the castles of King Ludwig II, especially Neuschwanstein.

== Images ==
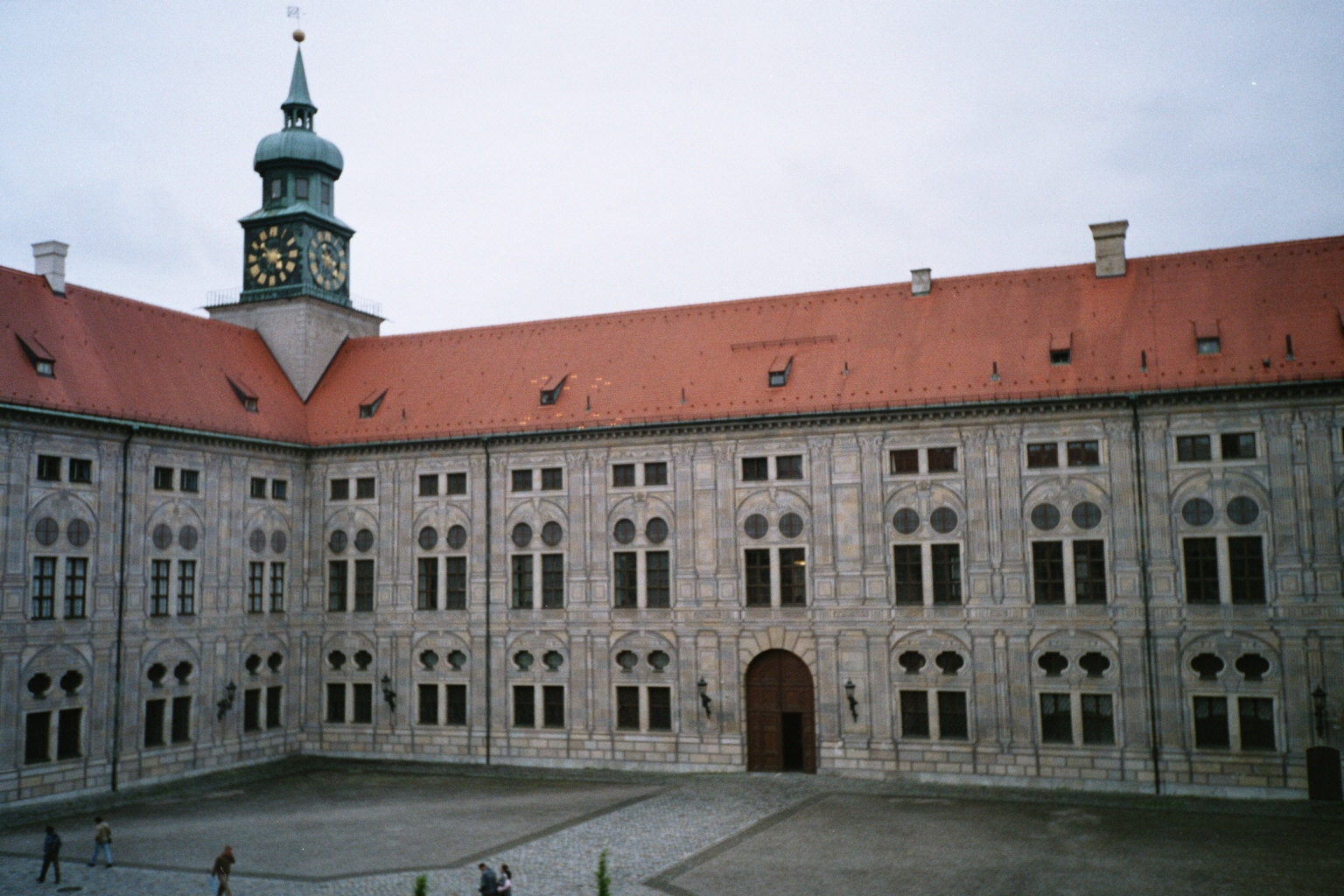
Kaiserhof, or Emperor's Courtyard

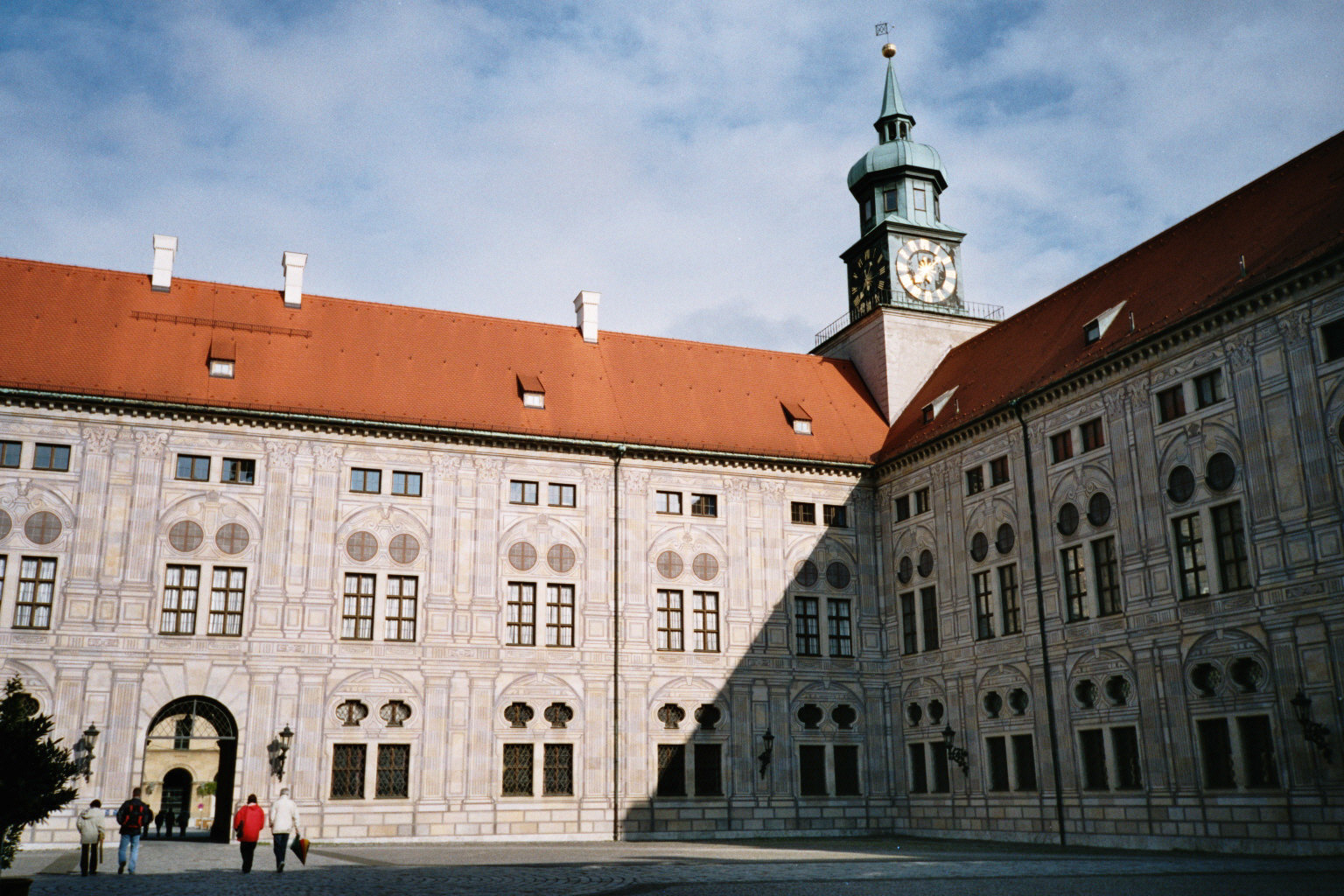
Kaiserhof

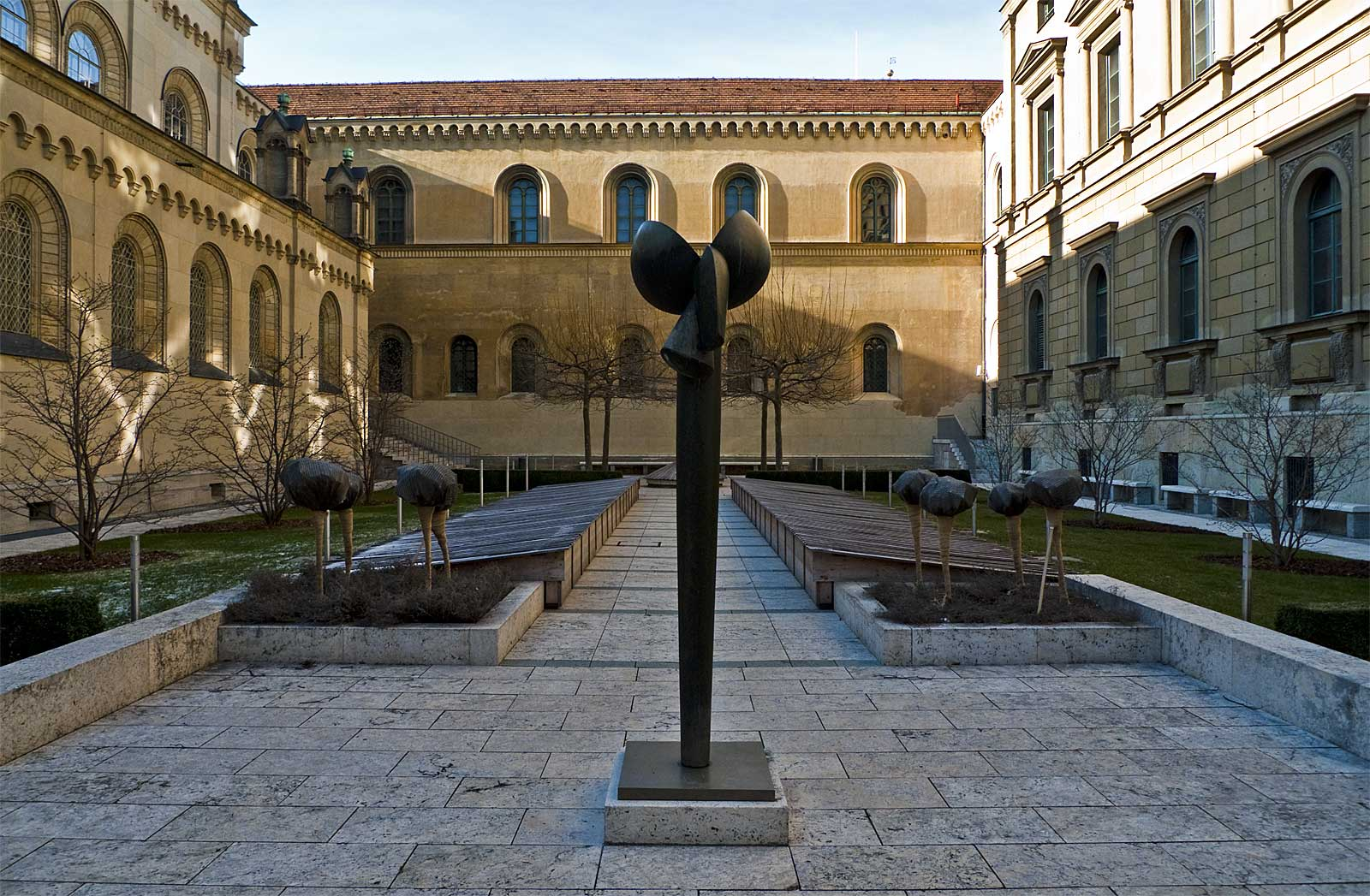
Kabinettsgarten of the Residenz, next to the Court Church of All Saints

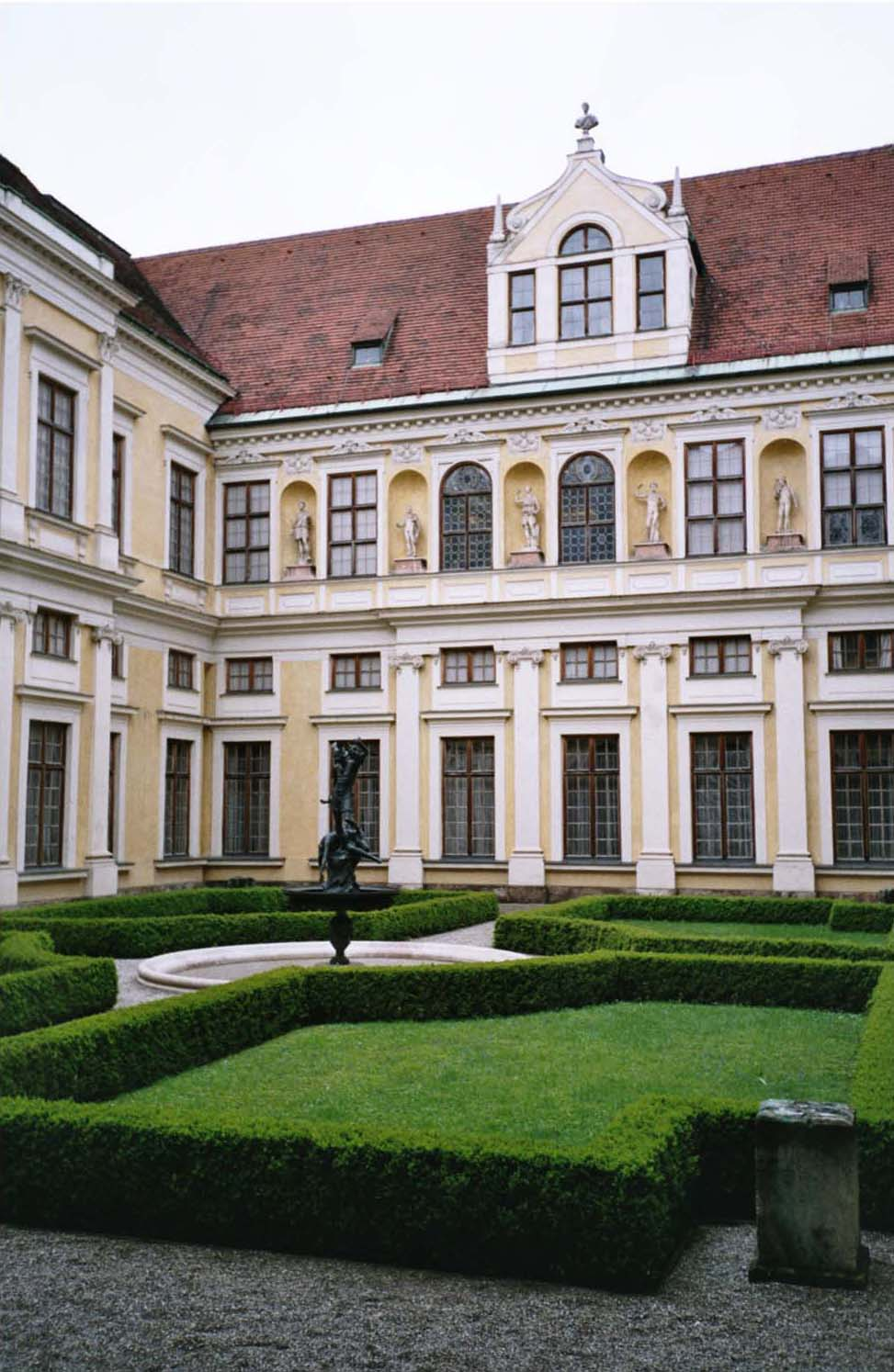
Grottenhof, a courtyard

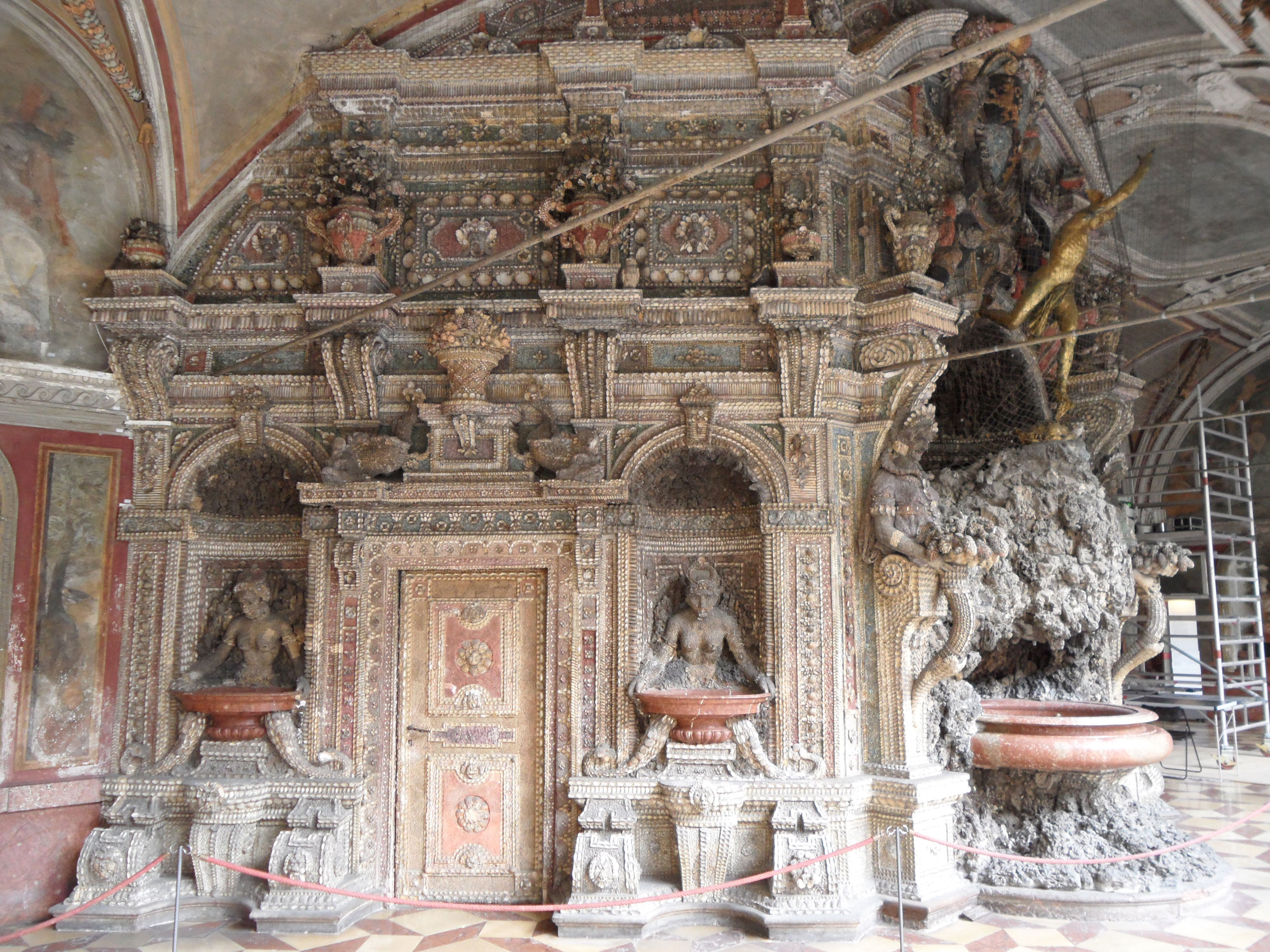
Grottenhof

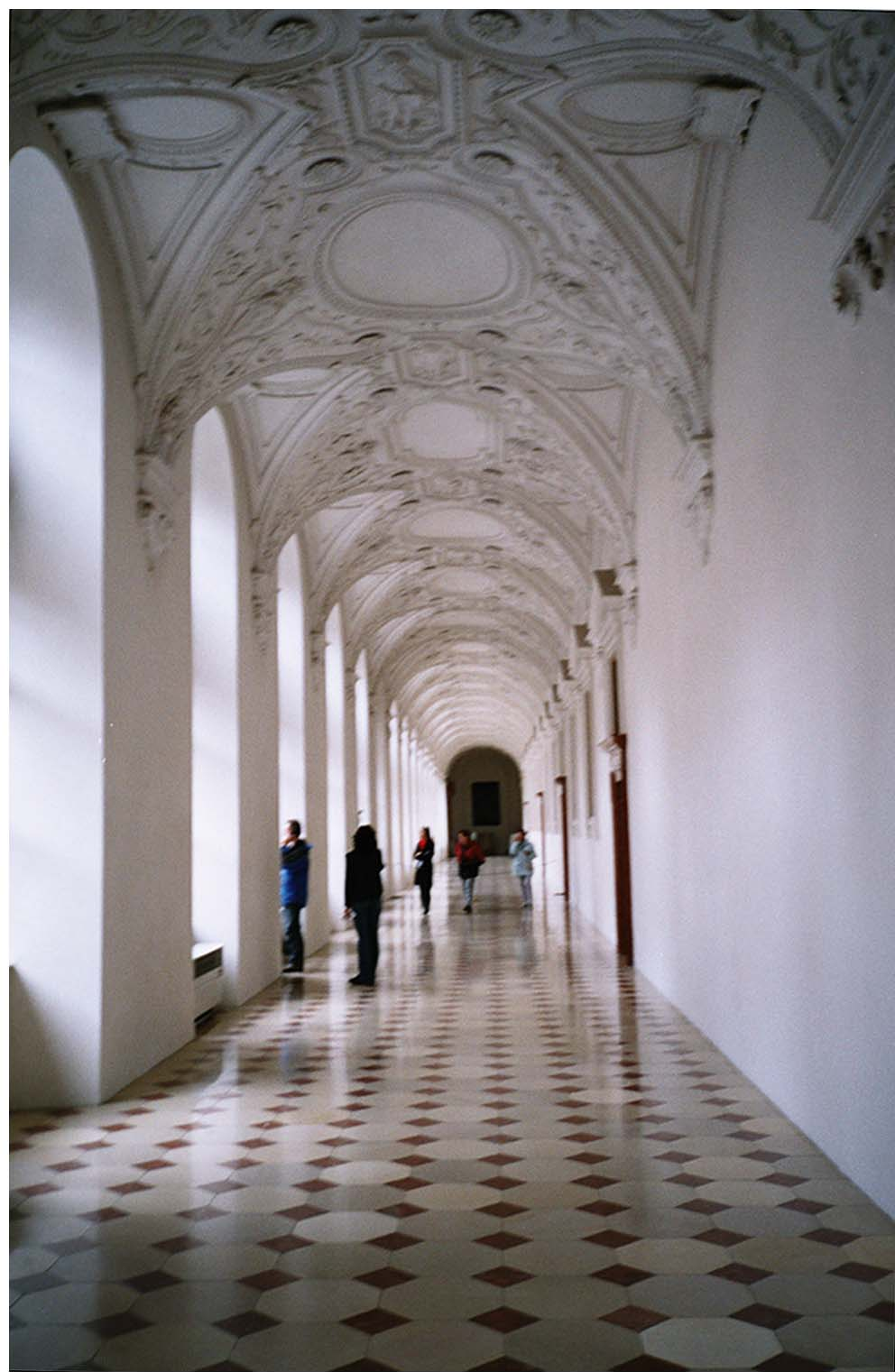
Corridor

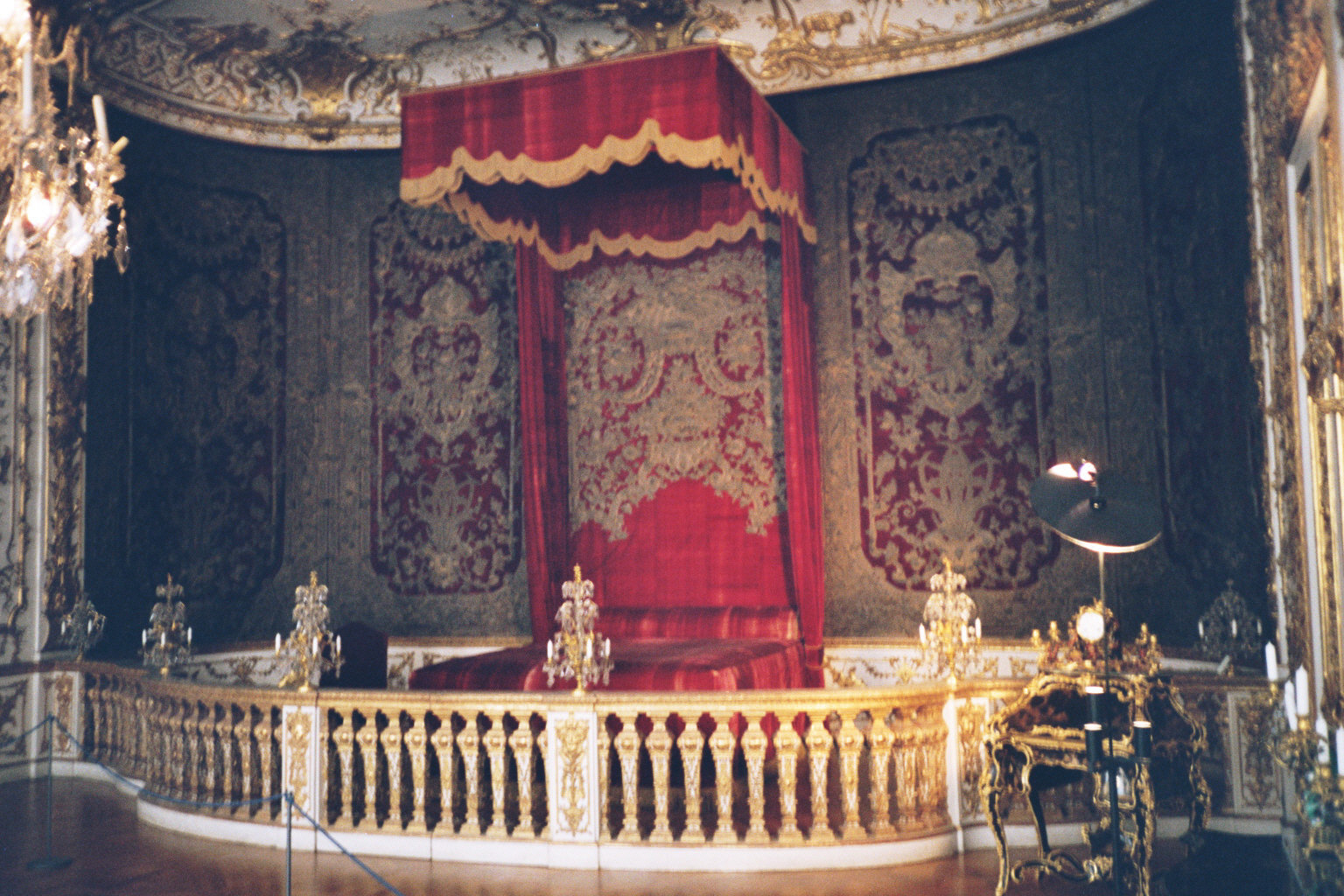
Bedroom of the Bavarian Elector

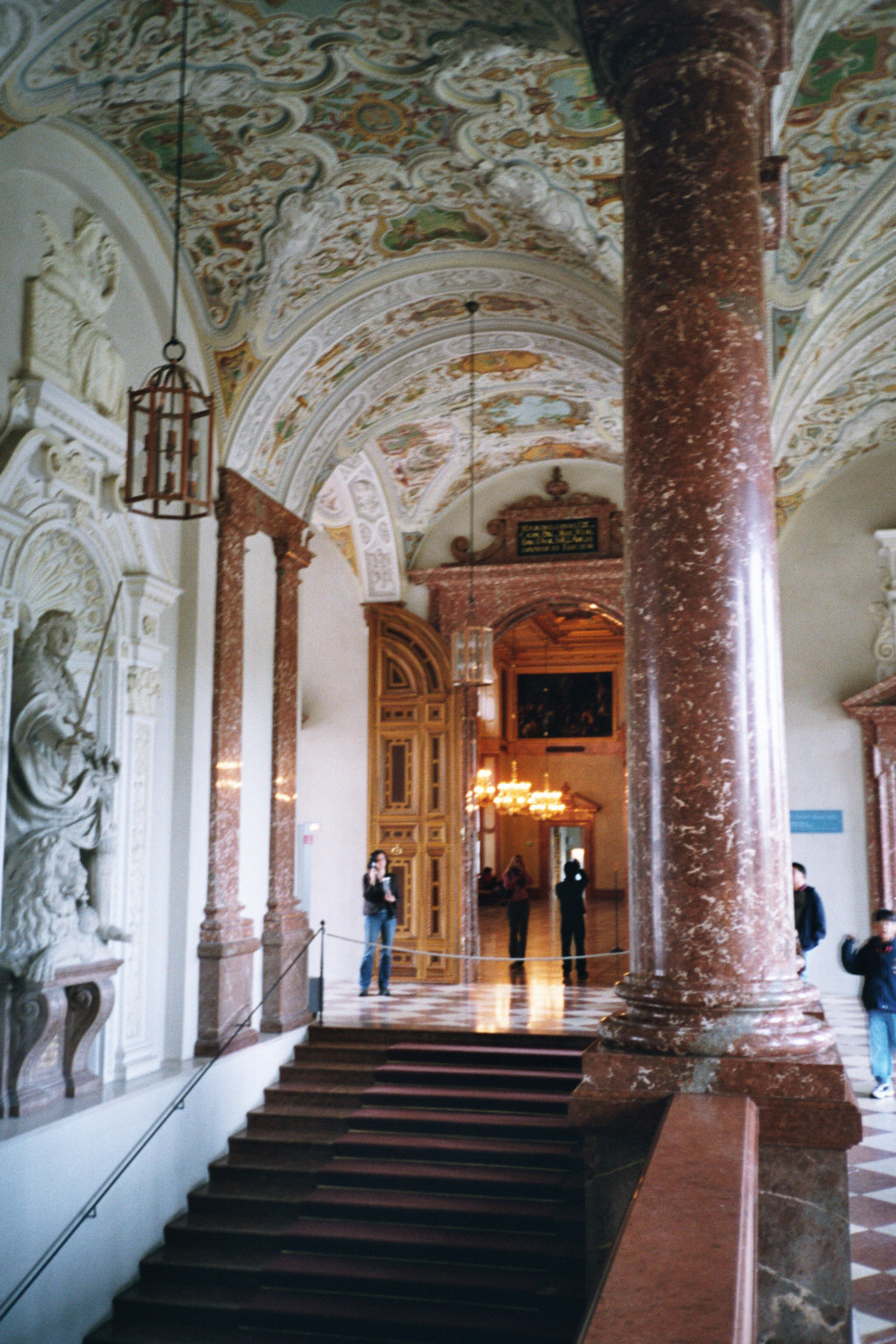
Kaisertreppe, or Emperor's stairs

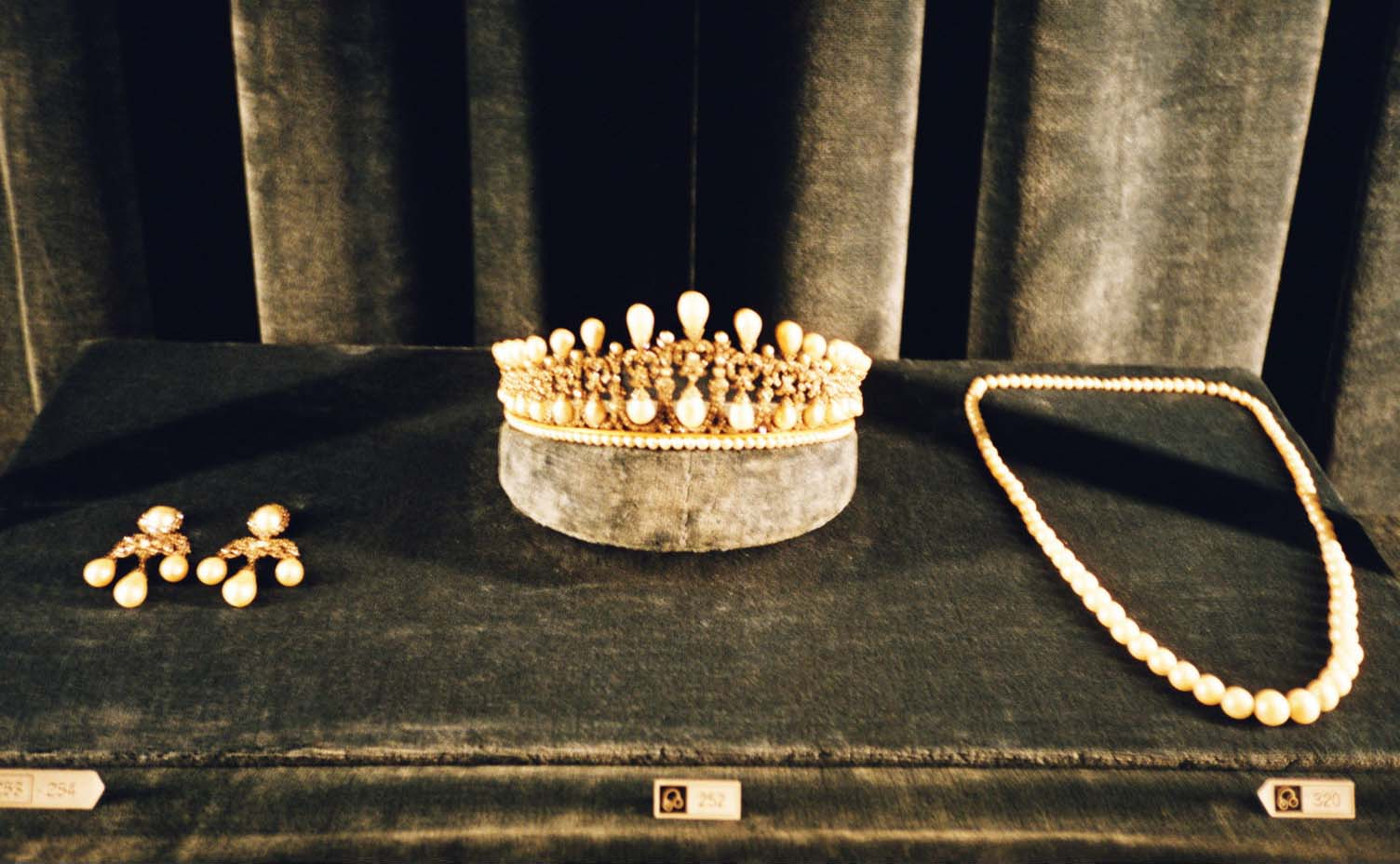
Pearl-parure of the Queen, Treasury

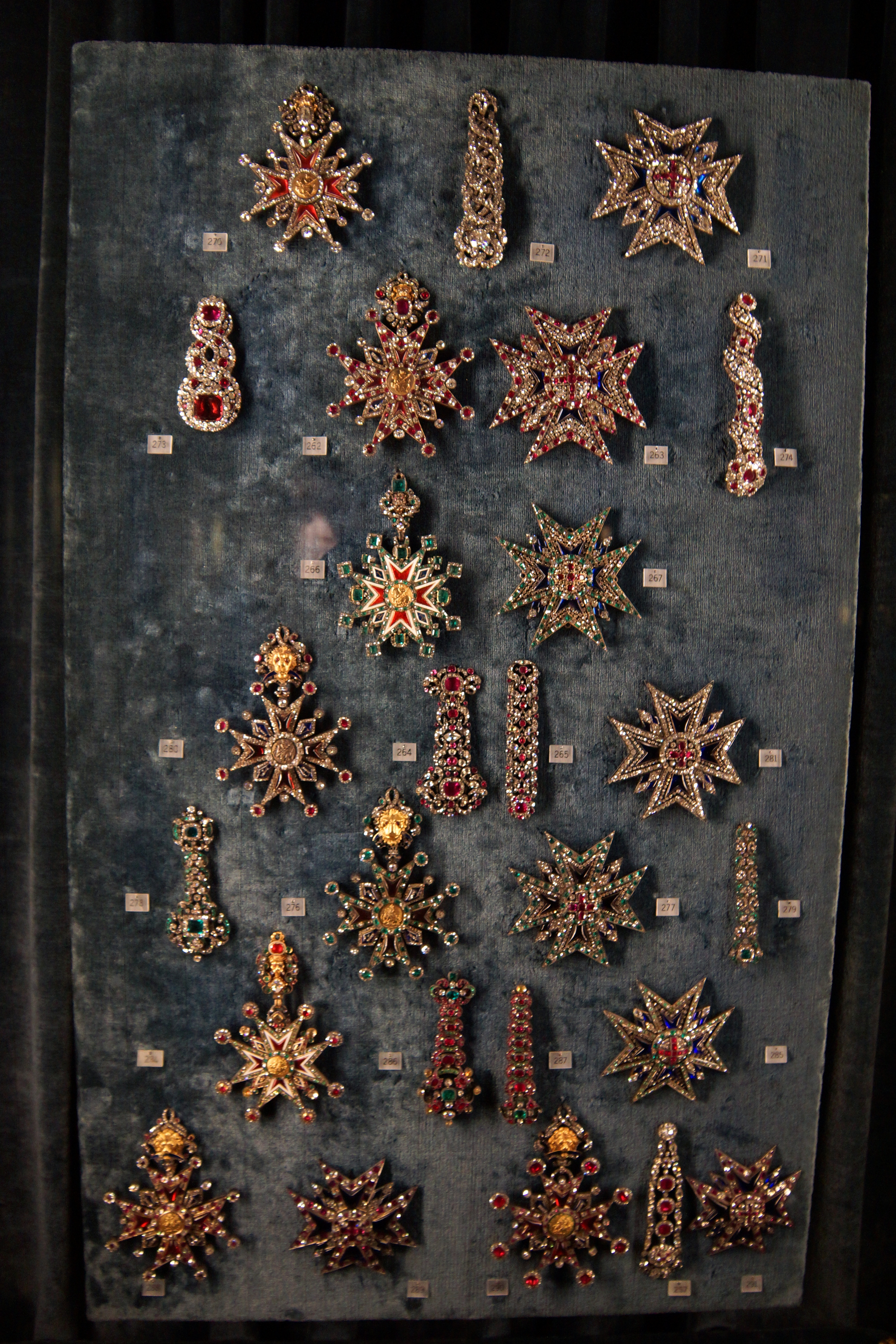
Some orders, Treasury

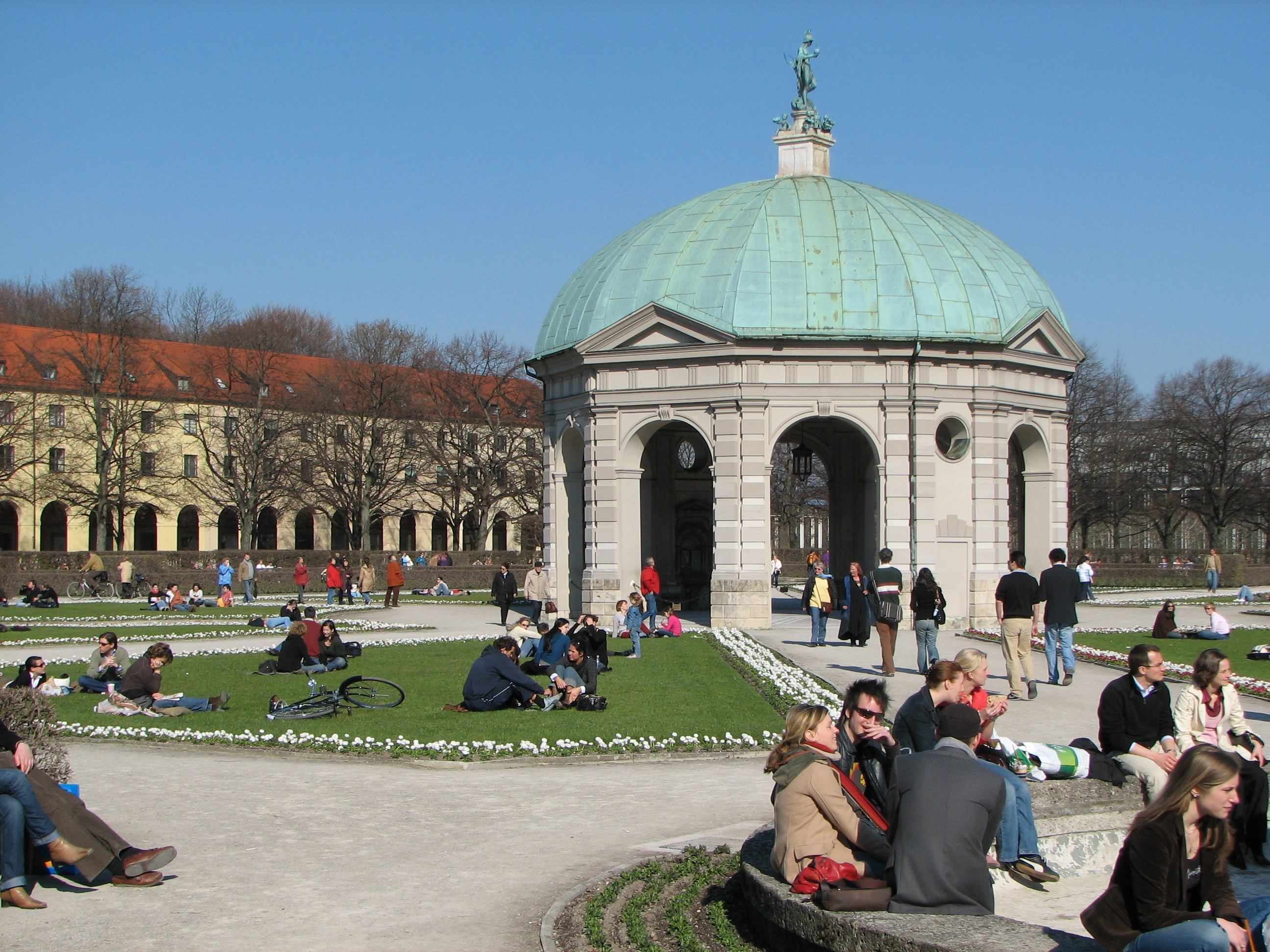
Diana's temple in the Hofgarten

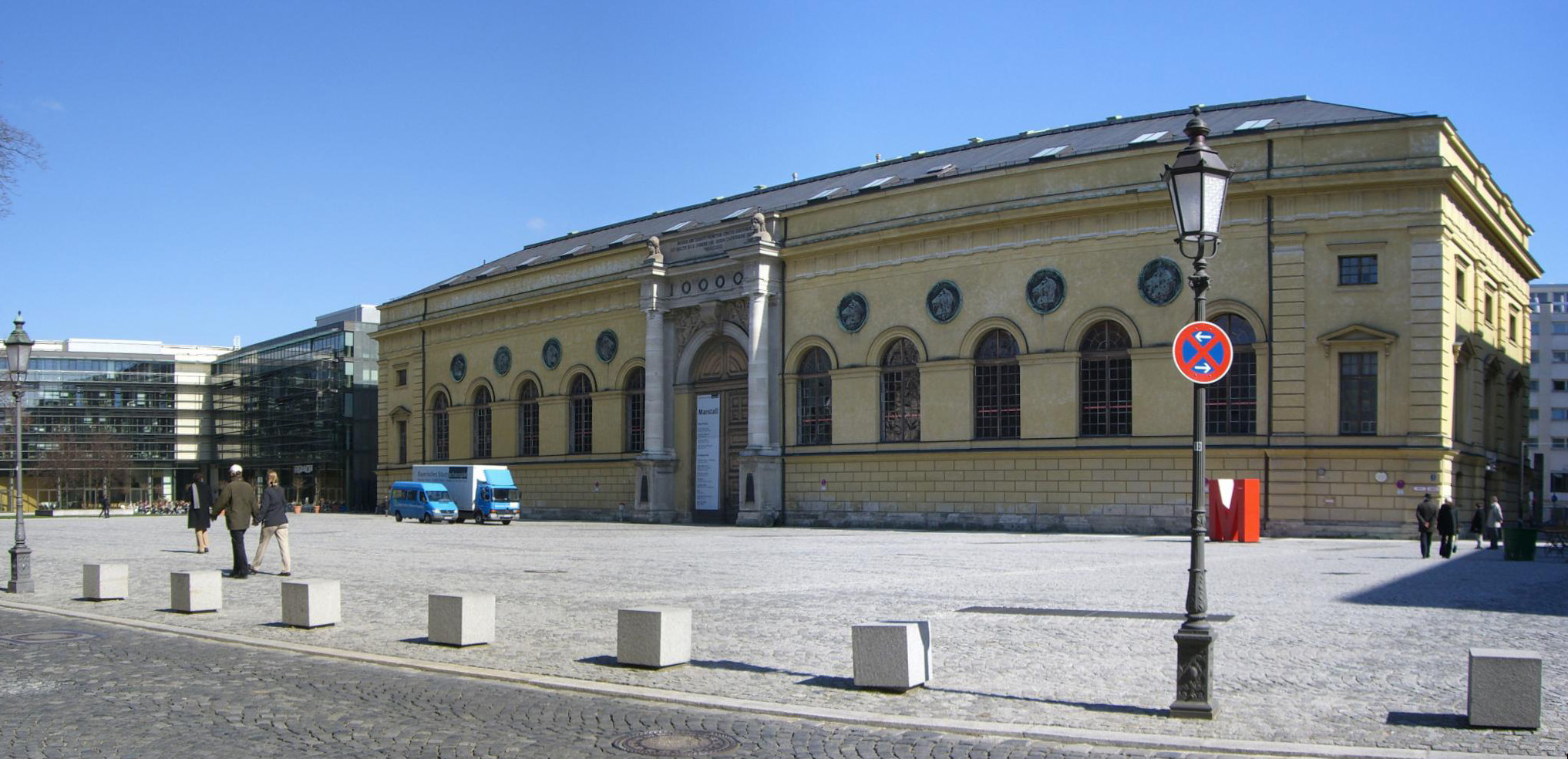
The Marstall (Royal Stables)

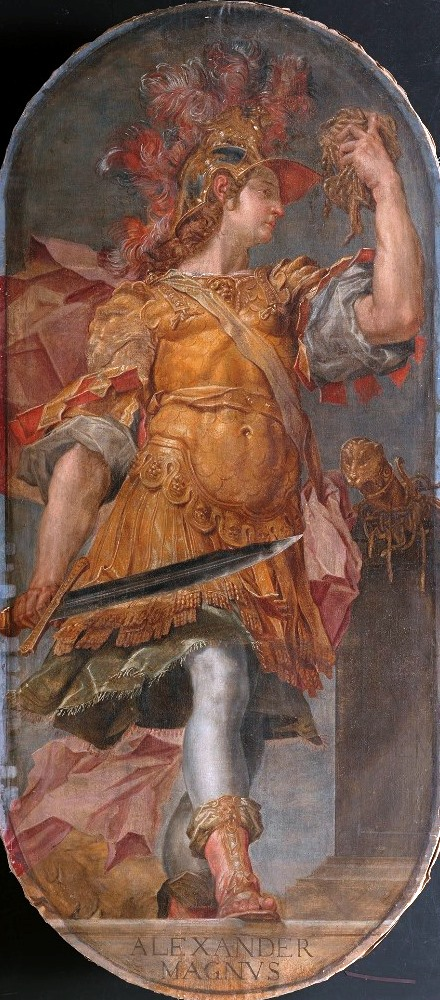
Alexander the Great, ceiling decoration by Peter Candid
