= Max-Joseph-Platz =

Public square in Munich, Germany

Coordinates: 48°08′22″N 11°34′46″E

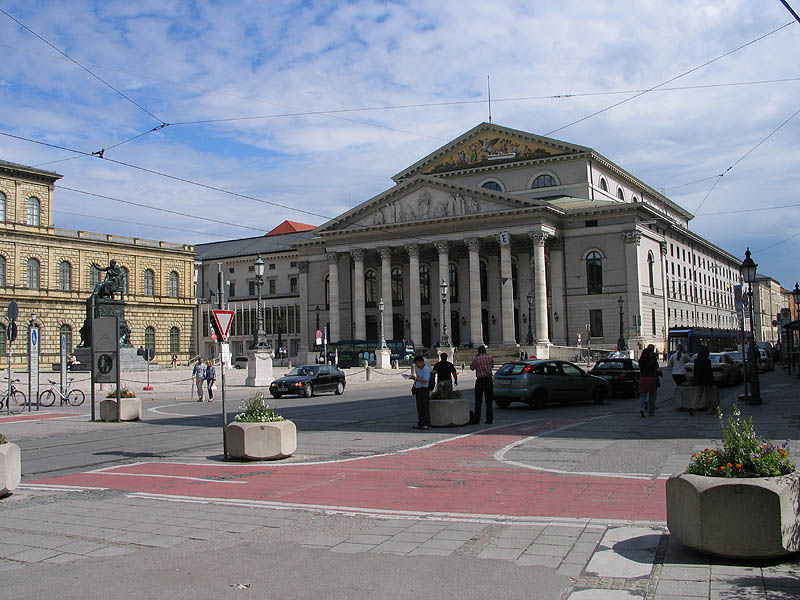
Max-Joseph-Platz, National Theatre

Max-Joseph-Platz is a large square in central Munich which was named after King Maximilian Joseph. Max-Joseph-Platz serves as the western starting point of the royal avenue Maximilianstraße.

== Architecture ==
The square was constructed with the erection of the National Theatre Munich at its east side, which was opened in 1818. Opposite to its Corinthian columns at the west side are middle-class houses. The north side is framed by the Königsbau of the Munich Residence. King Ludwig I of Bavaria instructed his architect Leo von Klenze to build the King's tract in the south of his palace in the style of the Florentine Palazzo Pitti. The facade of the Residenz Theatre is situated between the Königsbau and the National Theatre. The south of Max-Joseph-Platz is dominated by the Neo-Renaissance arcades of the former Palais Toerring-Jettenbach, a rococo mansion which originates from 1747. The Ospedale degli Innocenti in Florence served as model for its columns.

The monument Max-Joseph Denkmal before the Königsbau was created in the middle of the square as a memorial for King Maximilian Joseph by Christian Daniel Rauch and carried out by Johann Baptist Stiglmaier. It was only revealed in 1835 since the king had rejected to be eternalized in sitting position.

After World War II a subterranean garage was constructed below the Max-Joseph-Platz.

From August 2024 to December 2025 the square underwent renovations. The gravel surface was replaced by eight grass areas separated by paths leading to the monument.

== Sights ==
- National Theatre Munich
- Munich Residenz
- Palais Toerring-Jettenbach
- Memorial to king Maximilian I Joseph of Bavaria (Christian Daniel Rauch, 1825).
