= Kabinettsgarten =

Coordinates: 48.1407°N 11.5800°E

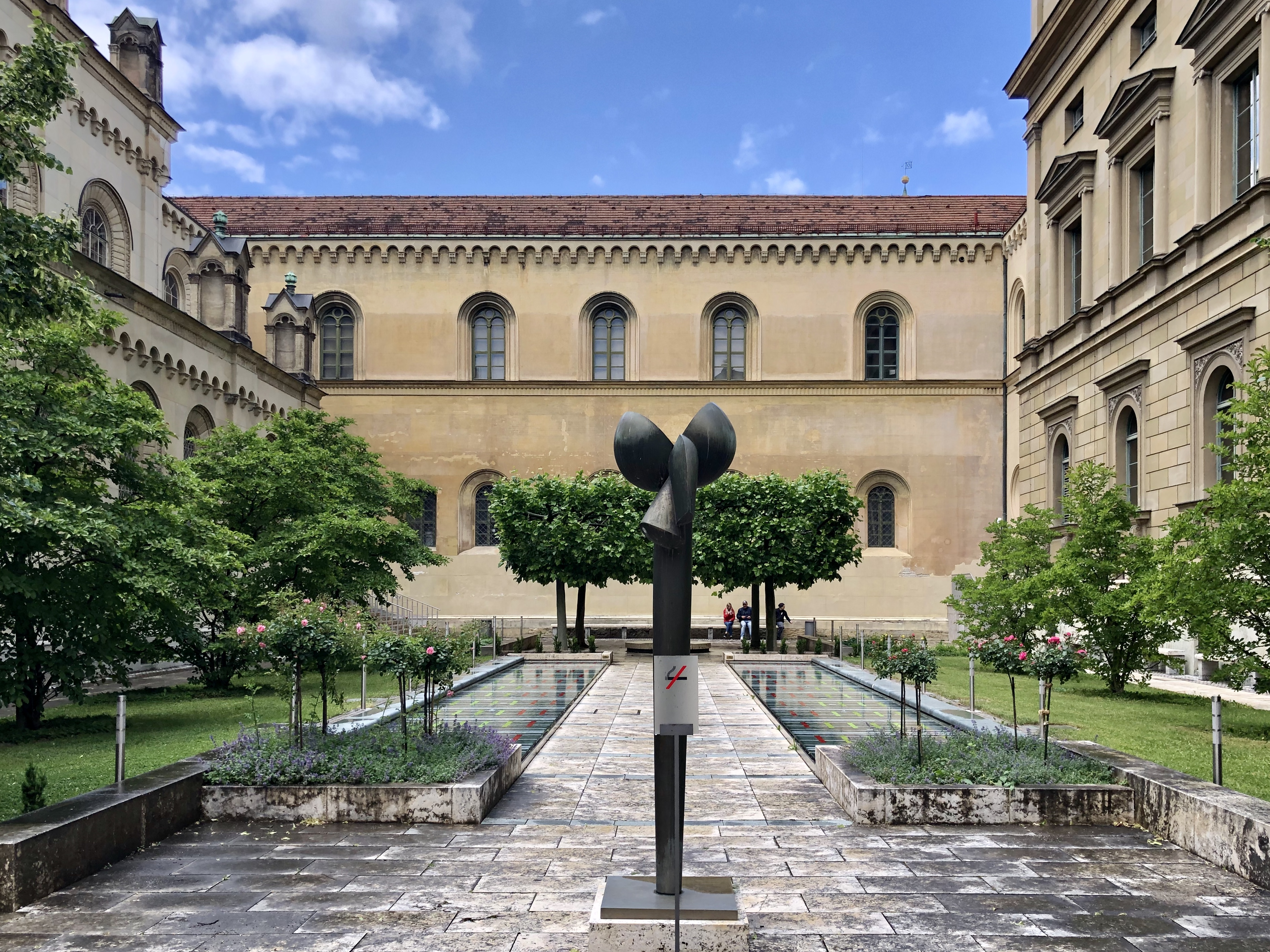
The Kabinettsgarten seen from the entrance with the sculpture Flora III by Fritz Koenig

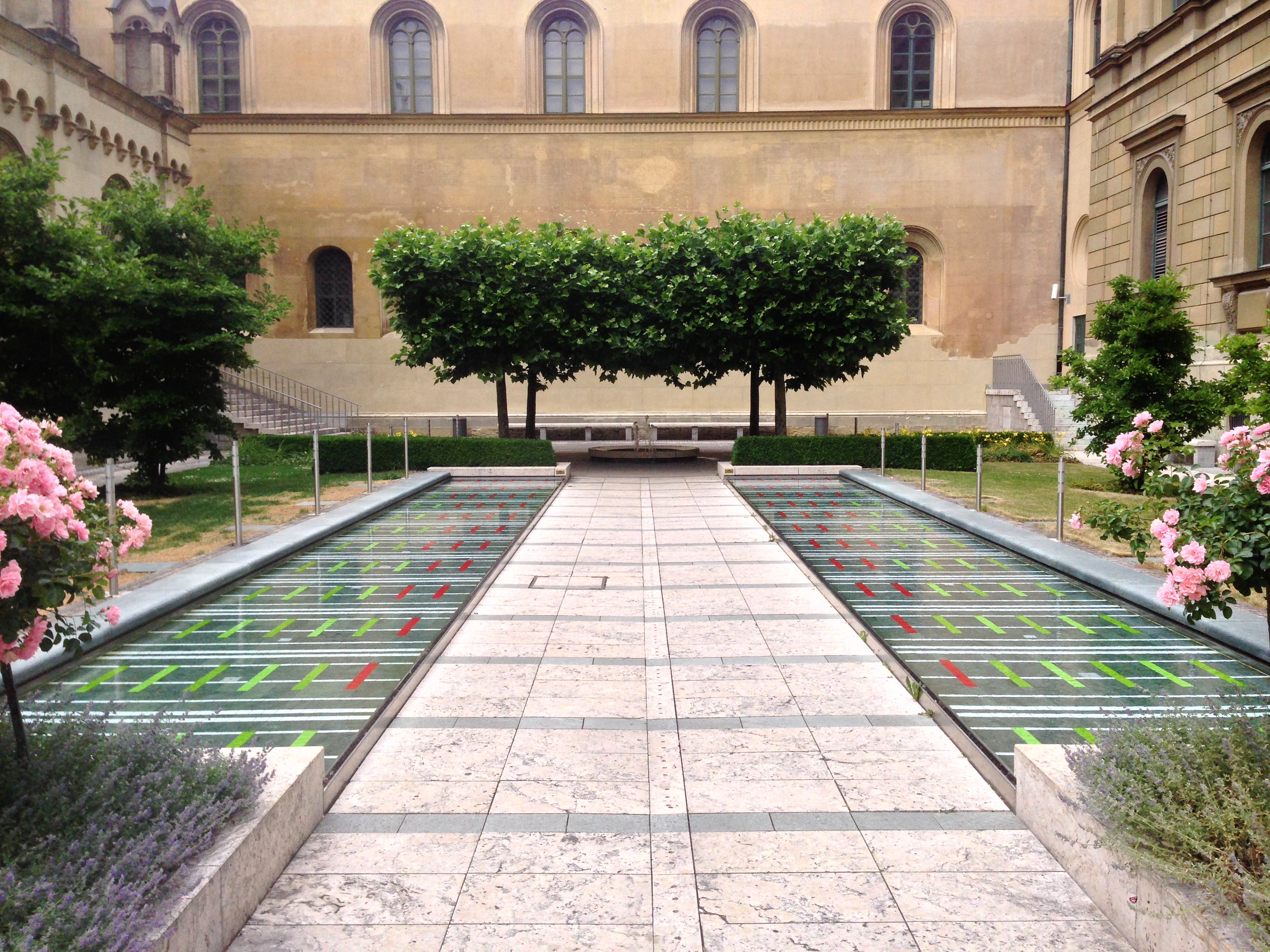
The pools and the planting

The Kabinettsgarten is a small courtyard on the eastern side of the royal residence in Munich. The Kabinettsgarten adjoins the Allerheiligen-Hofkirche.

== History ==
In the mid-19th century, the courtyard was built on the eastern edge of the residence, which was surrounded by a wall and could only be entered through a narrow opening. Originally a fountain stood in the middle of the lawn, which was bordered by four linden trees along the courtyard wall and a wooden pergola. In the 20th century, the garden became overgrown and was used as a vegetable garden or as a chicken farm.

In 2002, the Bavarian Ministry of Finance decided that the garden be redesigned by the landscape architect Peter Kluska. The construction lasted from October 2002 to June 2003, and its costs are stated to be 437,000 Euros.

== Layout ==
The small garden of 1000 m^{2} fills a niche in the building gable of the residence. It is accessible to the general public from Marstallplatz. In addition, a newly created outside staircase leads from the inside of the residence to the garden. It can be reached from events at the Allerheiligen-Hofkirche, the foyer of the Cuvilliés Theatre and the Brunnenhof.

Through the narrow entrance, visitors are led to a small square with a sculpture by the sculptor Fritz Koenig. The subsequent middle ground is bounded by shallow water surfaces with geometric mosaics, which are in turn edged by narrow strips of grass. At the opposite end is again a small square with a round, low fountain lined with four plane trees whose crowns are cut to grow together into a common roof. At the edges of the garden are side paths, so you can walk around the entire area. All around are benches where visitors can settle.

Floor slabs, steps and stone blocks are of very light limestone and loosen up the warm earth tones of the facades. The shallow pools have a dark base made of orthogneiss, which are divided by white stripes of glass stones. In them, a regular pattern of red and green glass surfaces is incorporated. Water and light give movement to the patterns.

The garden was honored at the Deutscher Landschaftsarchitekturpreis 2005 (German Landscape Architecture Award) and was nominated for the DBA Prize 2006. It is described as a "little gem" that conveys a "serene atmosphere" and "enchanting mood."

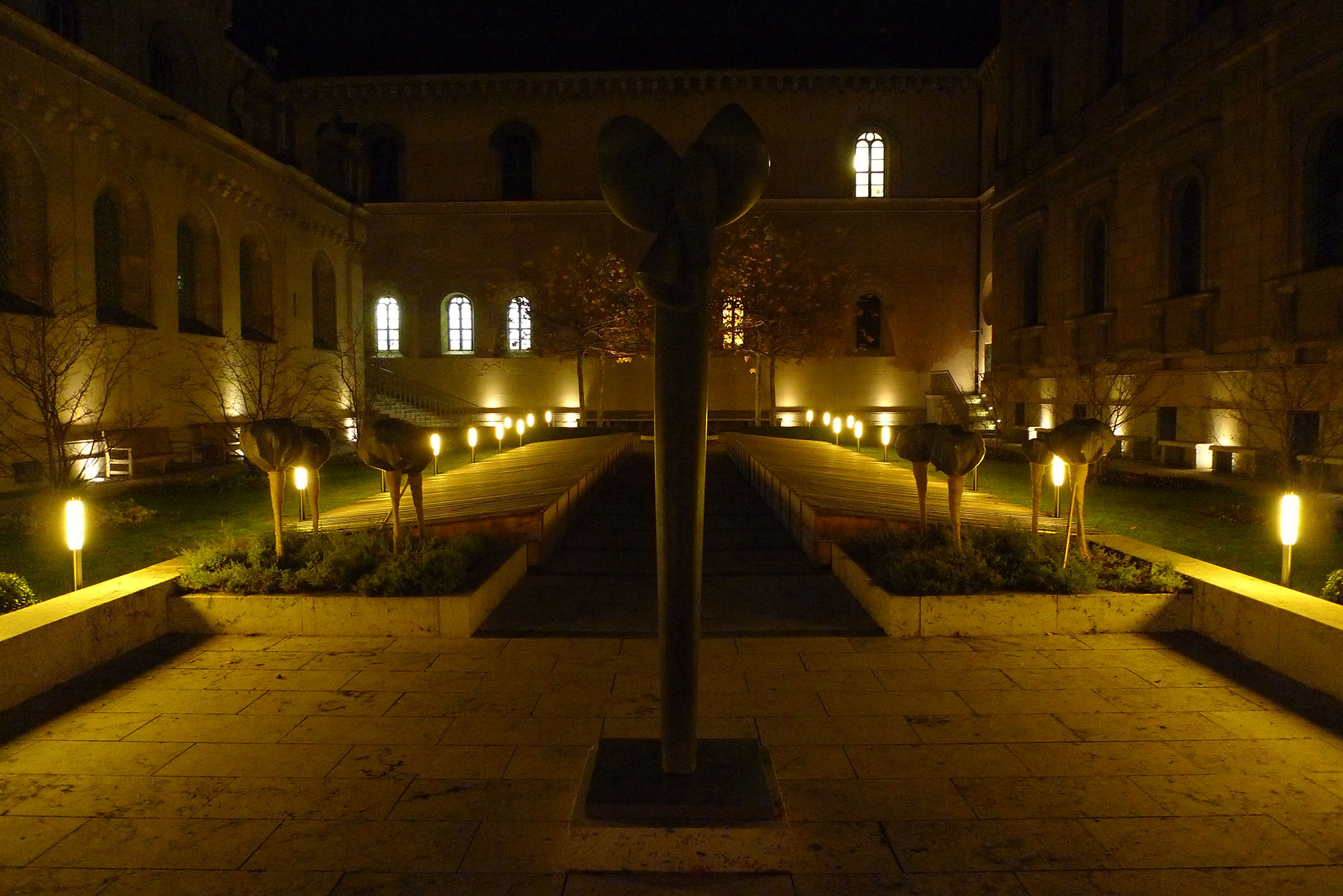
Kabinettsgarten by night
