= Sep Ruf =

German architect (1908–1982)

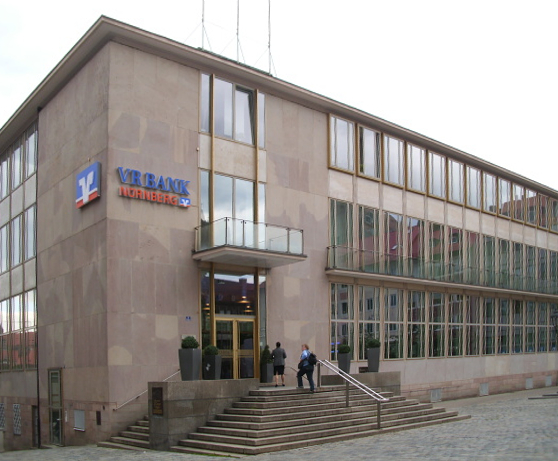
Bayerische Staatsbank Nuremberg atrium building

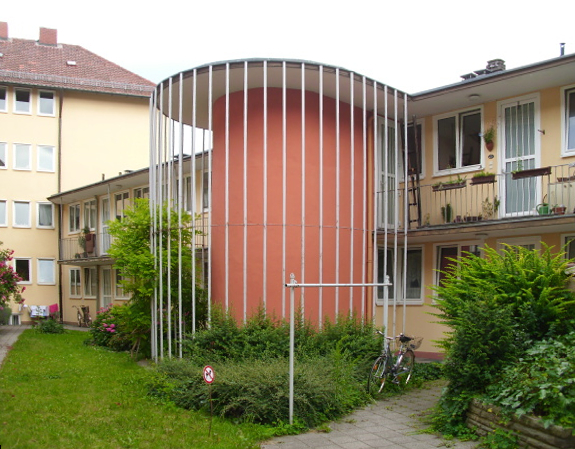
Hirschelgasse Nuremberg Patio with stairs

Sep Ruf (full name Franz Joseph Ruf; 9 March 1908, in Munich – 29 July 1982, in Munich) was a German architect and designer strongly associated with the Bauhaus group. He was one of the representatives of modern architecture in Germany after World War II. His elegant buildings received high praise in Germany and Europe and his German pavilion of the Expo 58 in Brussels, built together with Egon Eiermann, achieved worldwide recognition. He attended the Interbau 1957 in Berlin-Hansaviertel and was one of the three architects who had the top secret order to create the governmental buildings in the new capital city of the Federal Republic of Germany, Bonn. His best known building was the residence for the Federal Chancellor of the Federal Republic of Germany, built for Ludwig Erhard, the so-called Chancellor's Bungalow.

== Personal life ==
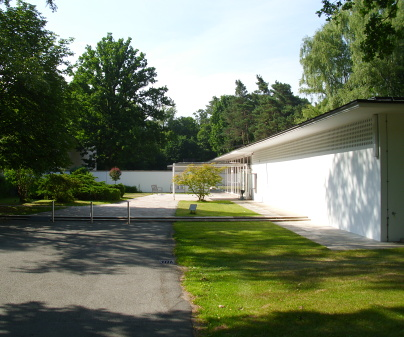
Academy of Fine Arts Nuremberg Entry

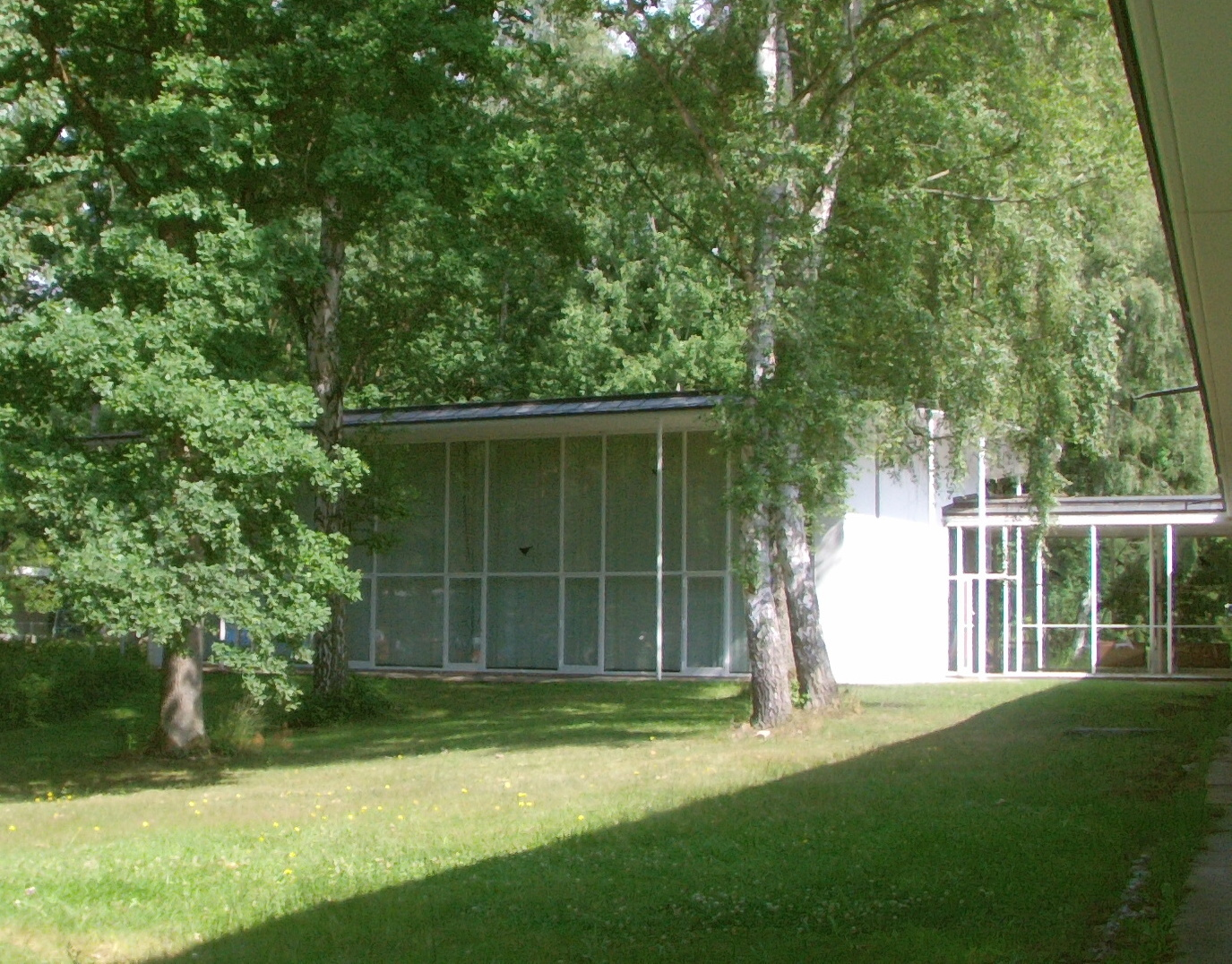
Academy of Fine Arts Nuremberg Aula

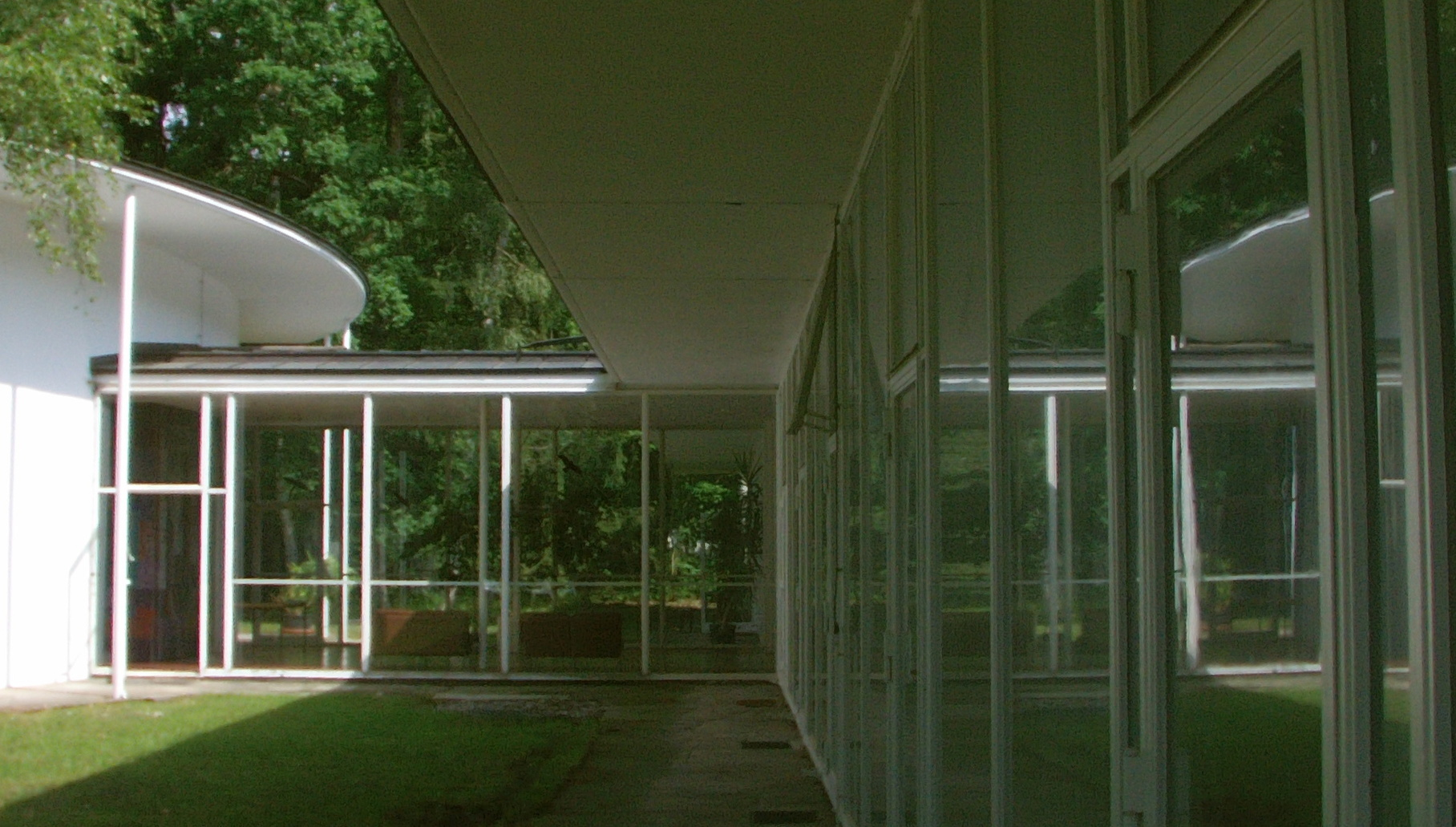
Academy of Fine Arts Nuremberg

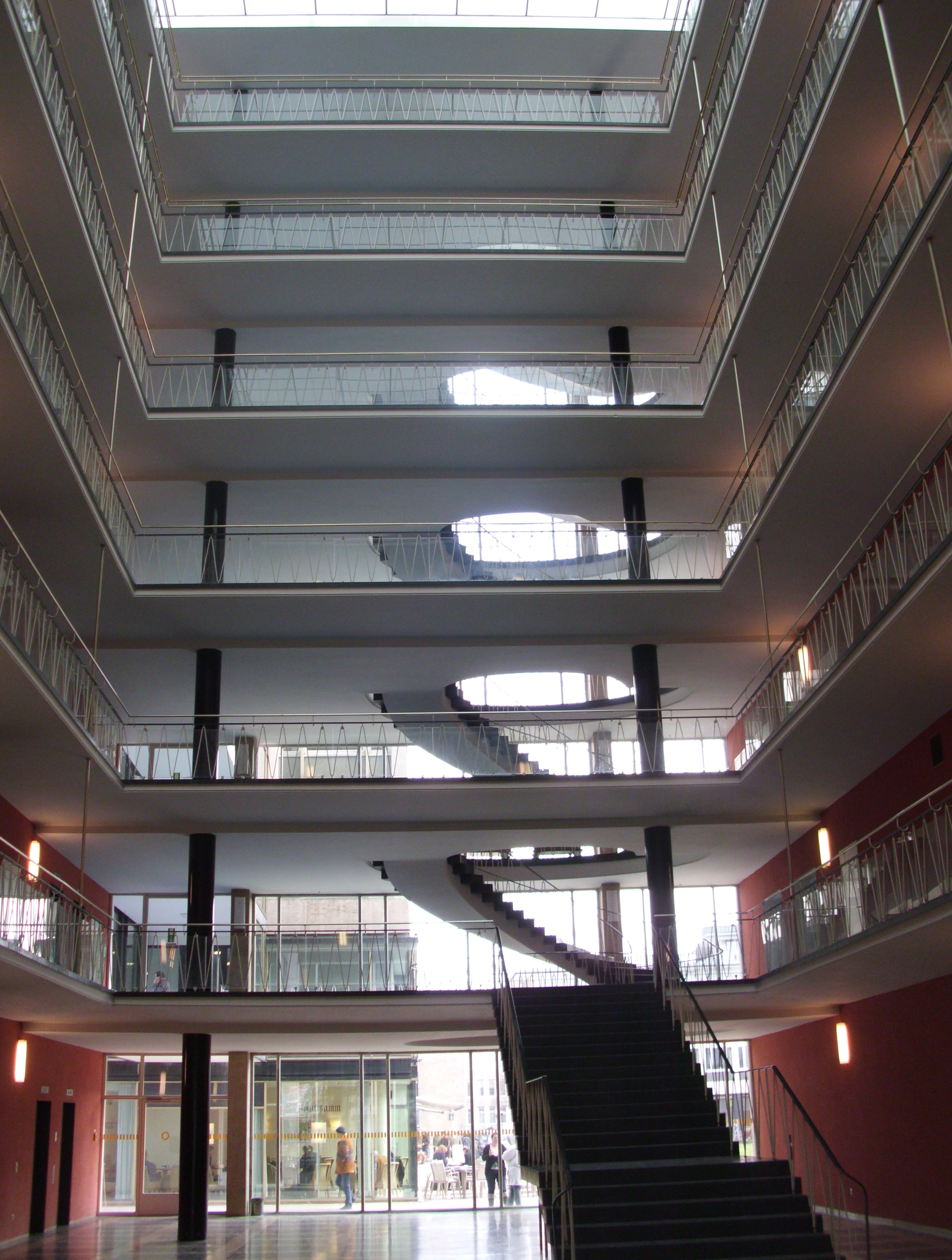
New Maxburg Munich curved stairs with glass-ceiling

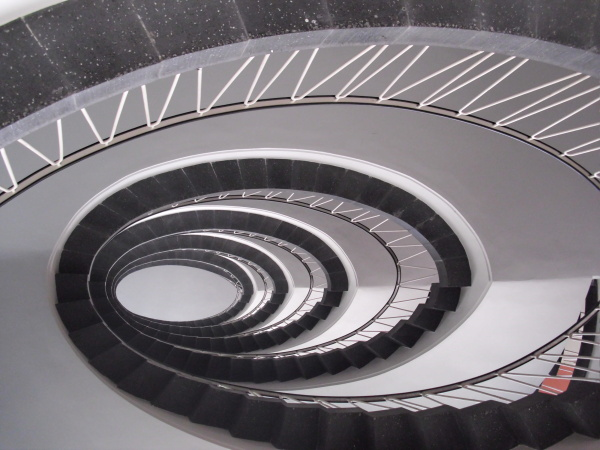
New Maxburg Munich stair

His father was Josef Ruf and his mother was Wilhelmine Mina Ruf (née Scharrer). The family of his father came from Dinkelsbühl and his mother's family lived in Weißenburg in Bayern, both in middle Franconia. He had a brother Franz Ruf born 1909. He spent his first years at school in a primary school in Munich. He was a Roman Catholic and joined the boy scouts, where he met friends he had for his lifetime: Golo Mann, the son of the famous German writer and Nobel laureate in literature Thomas Mann and the later physicist and Nobel Prize laureate Werner Heisenberg. Until his years of study he went to the Luitpold-Oberrealschule and he loved skiing and climbing in the mountains. During this time he met his later fiancée, Aloisia Ruf, née Mayer, born in Munich, 2 April 1910, a daughter of a factory owner. They married 1938, built a home in Gmund am Tegernsee and had two children. His bureau was in Munich. Ruf loved to travel and he visited Austria, Italy, Greece, France, Belgium, Switzerland, the United States and Norway. 1969 he bought a winery in Italy and renovated the house. He became friend with many artists like Marino Marini and Bruno Pulga and had guests in Italy such as Henry Moore. He also kept in touch with Walter Gropius, Ludwig Mies van der Rohe, Richard Neutra and Romano Guardini. He is called to be the German architect, who realized the ideas of the Bauhaus most consequent. In 1982 he died in Munich and was buried at the mountain cemetery of Gmund am Tegernsee.

== Early career ==
He studied architecture and city planning at the Technical University of Munich from 1926 until 1931. Then he opened his own bureau. One year later his brother spent a year in his bureau before he opened his own. Ruf began to build houses for doctors, actors and manufacturers and they loved his light and bright buildings. In 1933, when he was 23 years old, he built a flat-roof house for Karl Schwend in Munich and was cautioned from the new authorities, because from 1933 on the building of a flat-roof house was forbidden. He continued building houses and now he had to build them with pitched roofs, but the interior did not change and was still bright and had wide rooms and large windows. From 1936-1938 he was ordered to build parts of the Werdenfels and the Kemmel barracks in Murnau, after the war they were used by the US army and German troops. As soon as possible he went back to the building of private houses. In 1939 Ruf had to go to war. From 1940 to 1942 he was allowed to stay at home because he worked as an independent architect with the family of Hugo Junkers. From 1934 to 1936, one year before his death, Junkers had allowed the 26-year-old architect to build an estate for his workers in Grünwald, Bavaria. Hugo Junkers, who had lost nearly all of his inventions and his factory in Dessau to the new authorities and now lived near Munich under surveillance, now did research for metal-housing. In 1942 Ruf had to go to the Russian front and after the war had ended, he went back to Germany by foot and directly began his work of rebuilding Germany with the Church Christkönig in Munich.

== First modern buildings ==
One of his first works were buildings for the HICOG (High Commissioner of Germany), the Allied High Commission at the palace Deichmannsaue in Bad-Godesberg/Bonn together with the architects Otto Apel, Rudolf Letocha, Rohrer and Herdt. The tower-building of the HICOG went to be the Embassy of the United States in Bonn from 1955 until 1999. After the Embassy moved to Berlin the two parts became two ministries. They also built the residential estates of Plittersdorf, Tannenbusch and Muffendorf, where the German and American staff lived. Every estate had about 400 houses, wide streets and an apartment tower in the middle. Ruf made the development plan.

From 1949 till 1951 he built the Bayerische Staatsbank in Nuremberg an atrium-building with a large glass-ceiling.

== Professorship and teaching ==
In 1947 Ruf became a professor at the Academy of Fine Arts, Nuremberg. The original building was destroyed, so the first academy was in the residence of Ellingen. Ruf later built the new pavilions for the Academy of Fine Arts at Bingstreet. In 1953 he went to the Academy of Fine Arts, Munich and was the president from 1958 to 1961. In 1971 he was pronounced as an honorary member. He was one of the founders of the Academy of Fine Arts, Berlin (west), Akademie der Künste, he was a member of the academy from 1955 until 1982.

== Academy of Fine Arts Nuremberg ==
During 1952-1954 he built the Academy of Fine Arts, Nuremberg. The pavilions were connected with open, roofed passageways all in white in a green park with old trees. The flat-roofed light seeming building is the only campus in the world, made in this way. The only high building is the auditorium, on both sides open with glass-walls. The way to build these pavilions was later used again for the pavilions of the Expo 58 in Brussels. The studios and ateliers are looking to the atrium, so the students can work inside as well as outside in the green patio. It was the first building in southern Germany that became heritage-protected.

== Neue Maxburg Munich ==
One of his most elegant buildings was the Neue Maxburg in Munich. William V., Duke of Bavaria, built the residence from 1593 to 1596. In the 17th century it was called the Herzog-Max-Burg. After it was destroyed in World War II., only the renaissance-tower was still standing. The city asked some architects to find ideas for the place and allowed to destroy the old tower. Only Ruf and Theo Pabst were the two architects, who wanted to save it. So both got the order to build the Neue Maxburg. The steel skeleton building followed the structure of the tower and in the middle of the buildings is a green meadow and a fountain. The building of Justice is one of the most elegant buildings in Europe, like Nikolaus Pevsner wrote. Especially the Atrium with the glass-ceiling and the curved stair is impressing.

== World fair Brussels 1958 ==
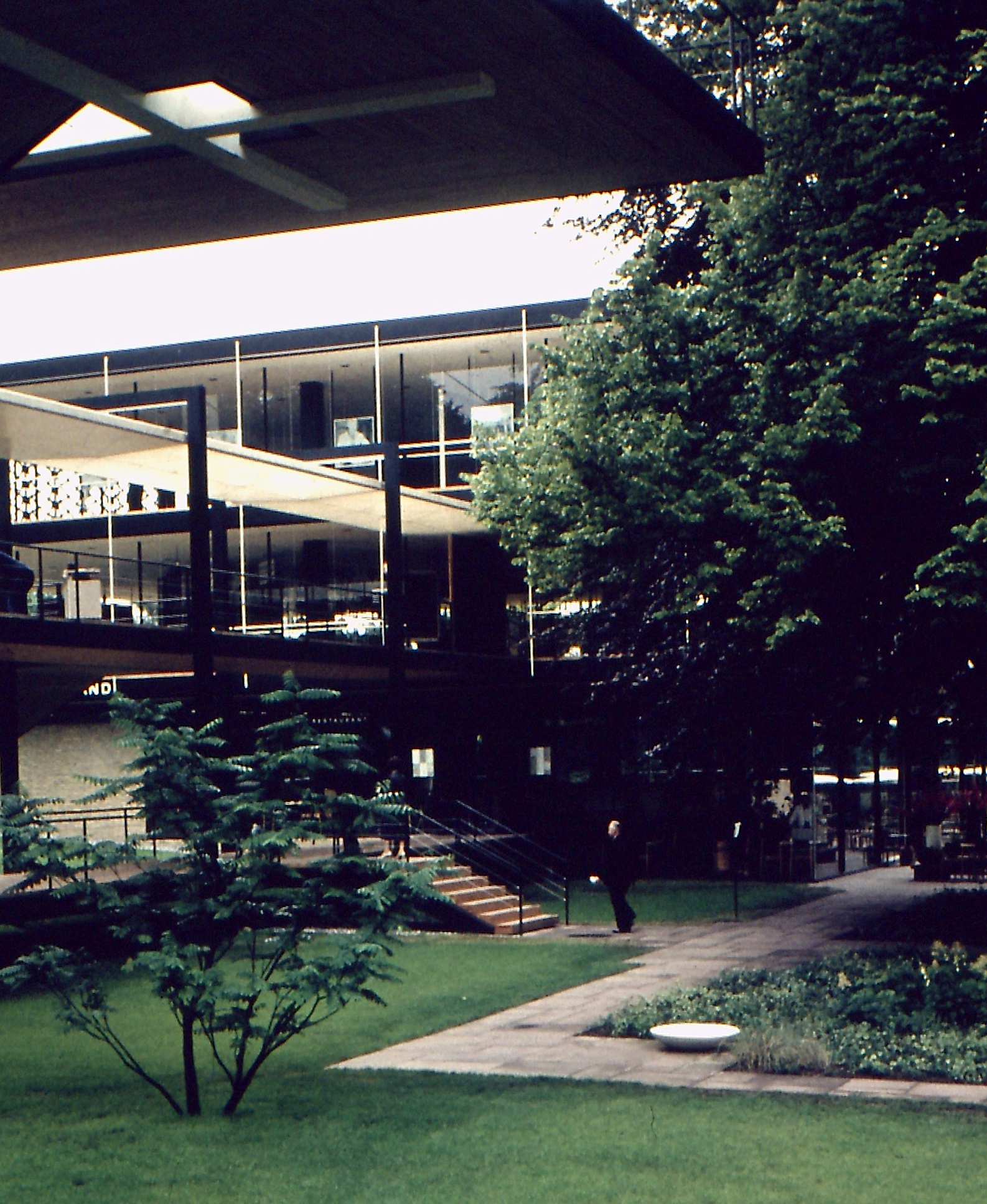
Expo Brussels 1958

The sign of the Expo 58 in Brussels was the Atomium. 41.454.412 people visited the exhibition. Ruf and Egon Eiermann made plans for the German pavilion and it was decided they should work together. They decided to build eight glass-pavilions that were connected with open pathways, like Ruf had designed for the Academy of Fine Arts, Nuremberg. They were placed within a garden of 6000 m^{2} and in the middle was a little pond. The garden was designed by the landscape architect Walter Rossow from the Deutscher Werkbund. There was a 57 m long steel-bridge with a 50 m high pylon. The newspapers of the world gave the best critics. The Times, London, wrote: "It is the most elegant pavilion of the exhibition".

== Chancellor's Bungalow Bonn ==
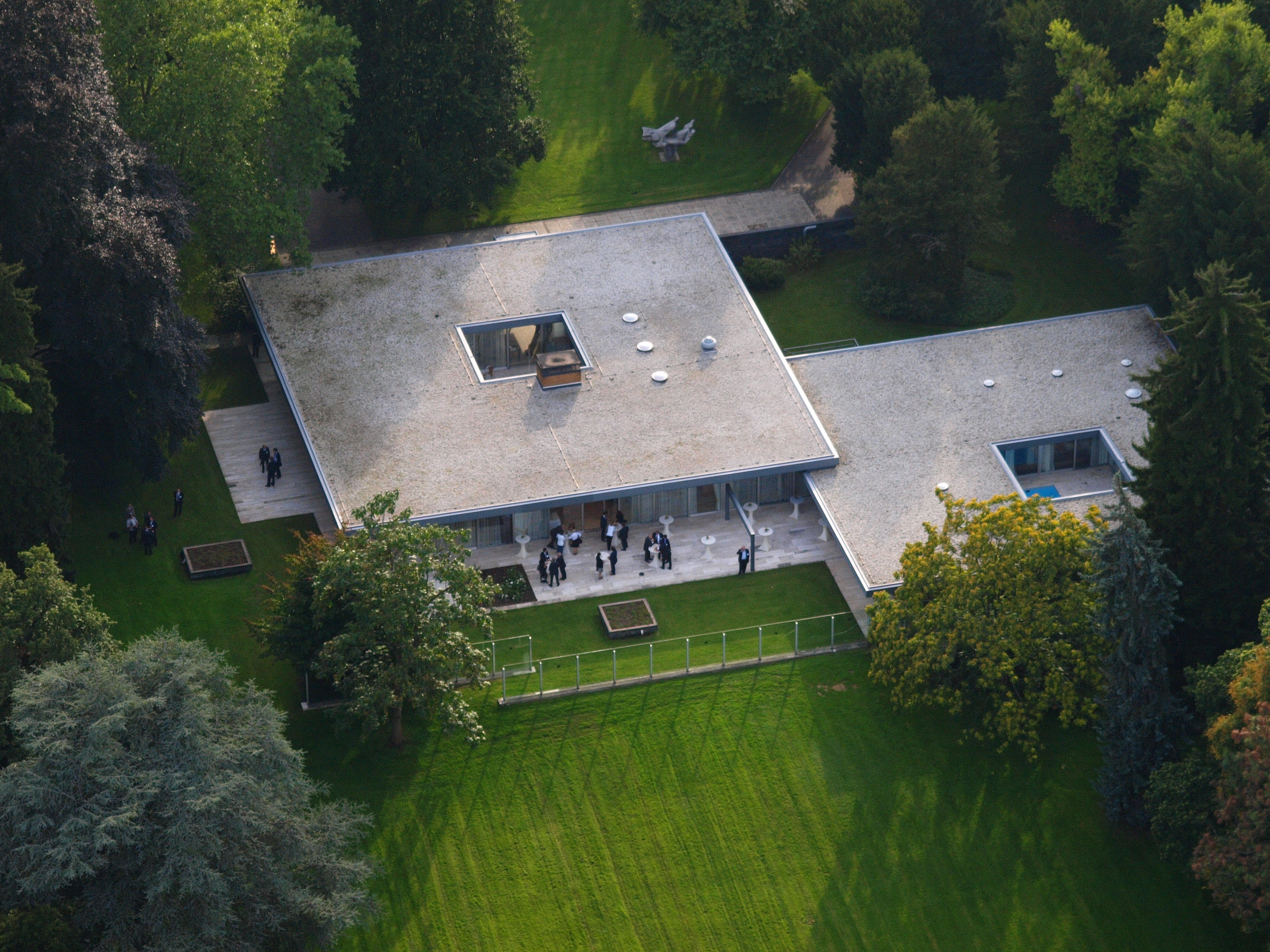
Chancellor's Bungalow

In 1962 Ruf, Egon Eiermann and Paul Baumgarten got the top secret order to design and build the government buildings of the new capital city of the western part of Germany, Bonn. Every architect got his own part to realize, such as the new upper house of the German parliament, the tower building of the delegates, the private and representative house of the chancellor of the Federal Republic.

In 1963 and 1964 Ruf built the house for the chancellor. It was to be a house to live in and also to be a representative building to welcome guests of state. In a park beside the river Rhine he built a flat-roofed house with large glass-windows, that should show the open democratic way, the new Germany was thinking. The bungalow is designed with two quadrates with two atriums and one part of the house is wide open to the park and the other private part into one atrium with a small swimming pool. When Ludwig Erhard got the keys he said: "You can understand me better, when you look at this house, as if you would listen to a political speech of mine". Ludwig Erhard and Helmut Schmidt liked and used the modern building, whereas Willy Brandt, who had young children, used it for state visitors, preferring to remain in his private residence. Helmut Kohl lived there nearly 16 years, until Berlin became the new capital city. Today it is a museum and can be visited. The Chancellor's Bungalow may be the world's most open, public official residence.

Ruf realized a lot of buildings in Bonn, for example the Federal Ministry of Food, Agriculture and Consumer Protection and the addition to Haus Carstanjen, the former Federal Ministry of Finance (Germany), today the UNFCCC of the United Nations Framework Convention on Climate Change, is part of the UN-Campus. 2014 the Chancellor's Bungalow was the central part of the German contribution at the 14th International Architecture Exhibition in Venice. It was built 1:1 into the German pavilion.

== Further modern buildings ==
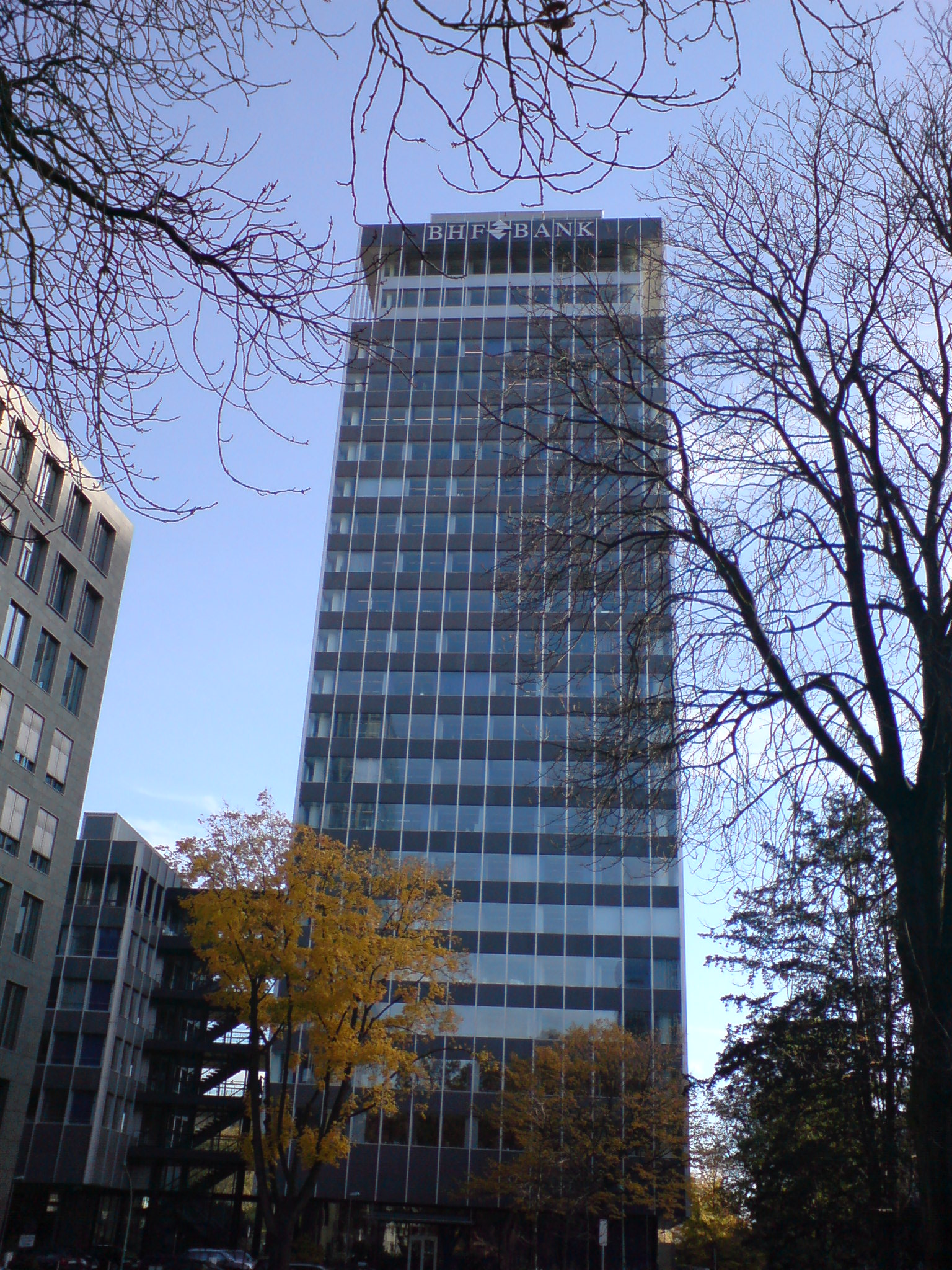
BHF-Bank

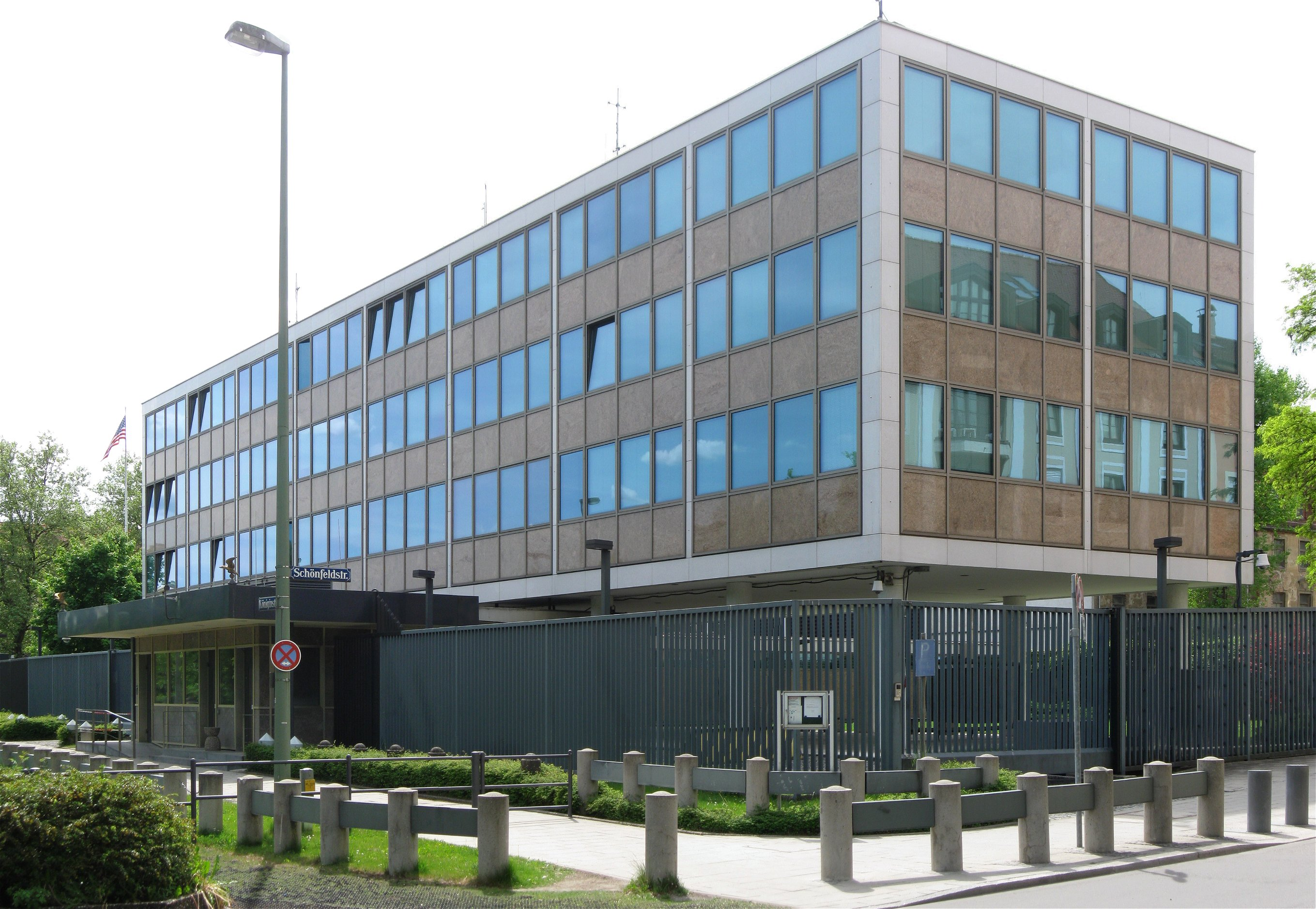
US-Consulat General in Munich

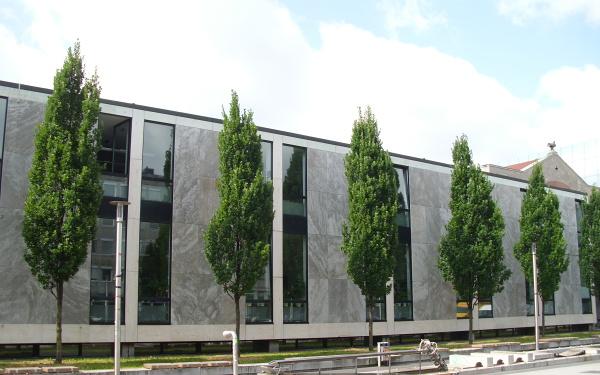
Germanisches Nationalmuseum Nuremberg Theodor-Heuss-Building

Ruf made development plans for the cities, of Nuremberg, Munich, Fulda and Bonn.

1960-1966 he built the tower building of the BHF Bank, with 82 m and 23 stories, 1966 it was the highest tower building of the financial metropolis.

In 1852 Hans von und zu Aufseß had the idea to realize a museum for a "well-ordered compendium of all available source material for German history, literature and art". Parts of the former Nuremberg Charterhouse, dissolved in 1525, were used for the museum. During World War II. great parts of the museum were destroyed. So Ruf and Harald Roth made the development plans. They began to rebuild the museum from 1953 until 1978 and Ruf designed several modern exhibition areas. The first was the Theodor Heuss -Bau. The first Federal President Theodor Heuss came to the opening and said, he was happy to see, that there was conceived something new, than to try to imitate the old.

St. Johann von Capistran is a round Church and it is called to be the last cathedral in Munich. Ruf built it 1958–60. The building is designed with two crescent-shaped shells, in the inside there are the sacred rooms. The flat roof is lying upon a circlet of glass and has a glass-dome. Outside 22 pillars hold the roof free above the open room.

The Bavarian State Library is one of Europe's most important universal libraries. With its collections currently comprising around 9.81 million books. The legal deposit law has been in force since 1663, regulating that two copies of every printed work published in Bavaria have to be submitted to the Bayerische Staatsbibliothek. This law is still applicable today. The Bayerische Staatsbibliothek furthermore is Europe's second-largest journals library (after the British Library). Parts of the Library were destroyed in World War II.

1953-1966 the professors Hans Döllgast and Ruf had to plan and realized the reconstruction of the eastern wing, a new area behind historic walls, and the extension building of the Bavarian State Library, a glass-steel frame construction for the bibliotheca. They made an available surface of 17,000 m^{2} and a volume of 84,000 m^{3}. In 1967 a jury with Hans Scharoun gave the price of the BDA Bayern to the extension building.

1956–1957 he built the royal picture palace am Goetheplatz in Munich, in those days one of the two picture palaces in Europe, playing Todd-AO, and Michael Todd came to the opening and they showed the German first broadcast of the musical Oklahoma!.

In Berlin he was part of the historic International Building Exhibition, the Interbau 1957 in Berlin. On the area of the Hansaviertel 53 architects from 13 countries made 35 drafts, that were realized by Alvar Aalto, Paul Baumgarten, Egon Eiermann, Walter Gropius, Arne Jacobsen, Oscar Niemeyer, Max Taut, Pierre Vargo and Ruf and others. 1160 living quarters, tower buildings and flat roofed houses, churches, cinema, library, kindergarten and a subway station. Walter Rossow, a landscape gardener from Berlin planned with a team the green areas. Three buildings of the exhibition were built by Le Corbusier, Hugh Stubbins (US) and Bruno Grimmek. Some of the artists were Henry Moore, Fritz Winter and Bernhard Heiliger. Ruf built two flat roofed houses.

Further buildings were the Max Planck Institute for Physics with the Werner Heisenberg -institute for Physics, in Munich-Freimann and the German University of Administrative Sciences Speyer.

The baroque town of Fulda called him to be part of the committee of art of the city. He designed the frontage of the storage- building of Karstadt and built the Patronatsbau, he also designed the Universitäts- and Borgiaplatz. The design incorporates modern architectural elements intending to complement the surrounding baroque structures. He also built the modern Church for the catholic seminary students in Fulda.

Ruf formed the Tucherpark, named after Hans Christoph Freiherr von Tucher (1904-1968), lawyer, executive spokesman of the Bayerischen Vereinsbank. There he built the technical centre and some administration buildings of the HypoVereinsbank at the Eisbach, from 1964 until 1974 the buildings for IBM and the Hilton Park Hotel. At Lake Tegernsee he designed the museum for the painter and graphic artist Olaf Gulbransson. 1978–1982 another building for a museum was his hall for aviation- and space flight for the Deutsches Museum Munich.

== Furniture ==
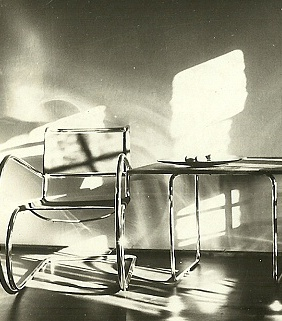
Sep Ruf steel-tube chair and table 1949

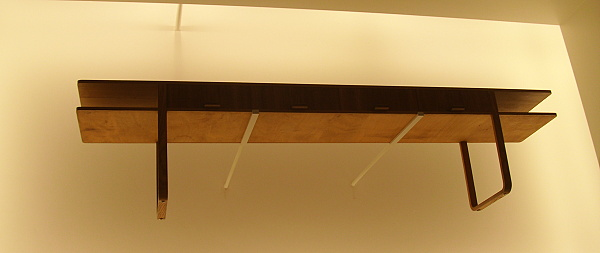
Sep Ruf sideboard for Ludwig Erhard in the design museum of the Pinakothek der Moderne Munich

Beneath his architectural works he designed a large schedule of furniture. He designed for every house he built and he made different works, belonging to the house and to the inhabitants. He used every material and worked with wood, glass and chrome. He made steel-tube furniture as well as lamps with basketwork.

His furniture designs transitioned from using wood to including materials such as glass and metal.

He designed for living, official areas and churches, even the sacred parts.

Mostly known he got with the furniture of the living- and representative house, the so-called chancellor's bungalow for Chancellor Ludwig Erhard in Bonn.

== Studies ==
The oeuvre of Ruf lead onto several academic studies and presentations about his buildings and his life and work in Germany, Switzerland, Italy and the US.

== List of works (selection) ==
- 1931: house of the fabricant of sweets Wilhelm Suwelack in Billerbeck
- 1931–1933: flat roof construction, house for Dr. Karl Schwend in Munich, because of the flat roof he was cautioned by the new authorities.
- 1932: house for Dr. med. Sepp Ruf in Ahlen, same name, not related
- 1932: house for the lawyer Willy Rosenbusch in Ingolstadt
- 1933: atelier-house for the painter Max Rauh in Munich, 1937 one of his pictures was part of the Degenerate Art Exhibition.
- 1933: house for Dr. med. Alfred Schönwerth in Grafrath
- 1933–1934: together with his brother Franz Ruf part of the residential estate in Ramersdorf, they built 16 of 192 houses
- 1934–1937: house for a friend Alois Johannes Lippl, director, author, on 25 January 1948 the US military government in Munich gave him the license to start the Bavarian radio, Bayerischer Rundfunk
- 1934: house Dr. Ernst Haß, Munich -Harlaching
- 1934–1936: residential estate Herrenwies for Hugo Junkers (today called: Hugo-Junkers-estate) in Grünwald, Bavaria
- 1935: house Brand, Munich-Bogenhausen
- 1935: house Karl and Maria Eder, Munich-Laim
- 1936: house of the poet Josef Martin Bauer in Dorfen
- 1936: house for the director Otto Falckenberg in Grünwald, Bavaria near by Munich, he founded the Otto Falckenberg School of the Performing Arts
- 1936–1940: primary school in Munich-Allach, today a secondary modern school
- 1936–1938: barracks for German mountain troops „Kemmel-Kaserne“ in Murnau am Staffelsee, 1946 - 1990 used by the US army.
- 1937-1938 house for himself in Gmund am Tegernsee, marriage 1938
- 1938: Oberland-residential-estate together with his brother Franz Ruf an der Einhornallee in Munich
- 1938–1939: barracks for German mountain troops Murnau am Staffelsee, Weilheimer Straße, Werdenfels-barracks, today used by the German troops.
- 1939: extension building for the primary school Allach, in München-Allach, planned 1936, while it was built the new authorities changed some rules and it was ended as a "Hochlandheim". Today it is part of the secondary modern school.
- 1945: house for the owner of a brick factory, Mr. Meindl, St. Wolfgang, Hofgut Reit
- 1946: house of Mr. Holzner in Dorfen
- 1946–1947 house of Siegfried Vetter in Feldkirchen bei München
- 1947–1948: house of Pius Egner in Notzing
- 1947–1950: Christkönig-church in Munich-Nymphenburg (rebuilding)
- 1947–1948: house of Fritz Espermüller, Kaufbeuren
- 1948: residential-estate Hausnergasse, Ellingen, Hausnergasse 13, 15, 17, 19, 21, commendation of the Bavarian Minister-President Hans Ehard
- 1950–1951: Bayerische Staatsbank in Nuremberg
- 1950–1952: First apartment tower in Munich, Theresienstraße 46-48
- 1951: American Embassy in Bonn-Bad Godesberg
- 1952–1954: Academy of Fine Arts, Nuremberg.
- 1952–1955: Bungalows in Gmund am Tegernsee, three flat-roof buildings, one for the later chancellor Ludwig Erhard and for himself.
- 1952–1957: New Maxburg in Munich
- 1953–1969: Building of the Deutschen Forschungsgemeinschaft, Bonn-Bad-Godesberg
- 1953–1954: residential- estate Hirschelgasse 36-42 in Nuremberg
- 1953–1954: Katholic church To the twelve apostles in Munich-Laim
- 1953–1978: Germanisches Nationalmuseum Nürnberg: re- and newbuilding, Theodor-Heuss-Bau, Bibliotheksbau
- 1954–1956: archiepiscopal ordinariate, Munich
- 1956–1957: „Interbau 57“, Berlin-Hansaviertel, two houses
- 1956: Bavarian representation in Bonn
- 1956–1957: Royal picture palace am Goetheplatz in Munich, in those days one of the two picture palaces in Europe, playing Todd-AO
- 1957–1959: Consulate General of the United States, Munich
- 1957–1960: Max Planck Institute for Physics, with the Werner-Heisenberg-Institut in Munich-Freimann ( especially built for Werner Heisenberg)
- 1957–1960: Church St. Johann von Capistran, in Munich-Bogenhausen, a round church
- 1958: German University of Administrative Sciences Speyer in Speyer
- 1958: German Pavilions for the Expo 58 in Brussels
- 1960–1963: house for Nicolas Hayek at Hallwilersee, Switzerland
- 1961: department store Bilka am Friedrichsplatz in Kassel
- 1963–1966: department store Karstadt, Fulda, urban conception construction of the frontage, new-building of the university-place, part of the "Denkmaltopographie Fulda“,
- 1963–1965: Patronatsbau, Fulda, with the conception of the Borgia-place and the fountain of Bonifatius, part of the "Denkmaltopographie Fulda“
- 1963–1966: house and residence of the Chancellors of the Federal Republic of Germany, Chancellor's Bungalow in Bonn
- 1964–1966: Olaf-Gulbransson-Museum for the painter and graphic artist Olaf Gulbransson in Tegernsee
- 1966–1970: extension building for the Federal Ministry for the Treasury (Federal Ministry of Finance (Germany)) Haus Carstanjen, Bonn-Bad Godesberg, Ruf and Manfred Adams
- 1966: extension building/eastern part of the Bavarian State Library in Munich, work of the professors Hans Döllgast and Ruf (1953-1966) and Georg Werner (1953-1960), later Hellmut Kirsten (1957-1966), BDA-Price of Bavaria (Association of German Architects)
- 1966–1968: chapel for the catholic seminary students in Fulda
- 1968: office tower-building for the Federal Ministry of Defence (Germany), Bonn
- 1968–1970: Technical Centre of the HypoVereinsbank "Am Tivoli", Tucherpark in Munich
- 1968–1972: IBM in Munich
- 1970: BHF Bank tower-building in Frankfurt-on-Main, when it was built, it was the highest tower-building in Frankfurt
- 1970–1972: Hilton Park Hotel in Munich
- 1972–1977: Antico Podere Gagliole, vineyard estate for the publisher Rolf Becker, Toskana
- 1973–1974: house Mr. Dohrn, Bad Homburg v.d. Höhe
- 1974: renovation and expansion of Hermersberg Palace for the businessman Reinhold Würth, Niedernhall, Hermersberg
- 1978–1979, 1980: administration building for the DATEV, Nuremberg
- 1978–1982: Hall for aviation- and space flight for the Deutschen Museums Munich

== Exhibitions ==
- In memoriam Sep Ruf, 1985/86, Ausstellungen: Neue Sammlung, Munich, Akademie der Bildenden Künste, Berlin and Bayerische Vereinsbank, Nuremberg.
- Sep Ruf 1908–1982 – Sep Ruf 1908-1982 Modernism with Tradition im Architekturmuseum der Technischen Universität München in der Pinakothek der Moderne, München (31. Juli bis 5. Oktober 2008)
- Sep Ruf 1908–1982. Sep Ruf 1908-1982 Modernism with Tradition./ 1. Oktober 2009 – 22. November 2009 / Architekturgalerie am Weißenhof | Stuttgart Die Architekturgalerie am Weißenhof zeigt Teile der Ausstellung des Architekturmuseum der Technischen Universität München.
- Sep Ruf - Planungen und Bauten für Bonn in den 50er und 60er Jahren, GKG-Gesellschaft für Kunst und Gestaltung Bonn
- Sep Ruf 1908–1982 | Sep Ruf 1908-1982 Modernism with Tradition, ergänzt um: Wie die Quadrate auf den Uniplatz kamen ... – Sep Ruf in Fulda im Vonderau Museum | Fulda (15. Juni – 25. September 2011)
- The Architect - History and Present of a Profession, 27.09.2012 - 03.02.2013 Pinakothek der Moderne
- 100 años de arquitectura y diseño en Alemania, Deutscher Werkbund 1907 – 2007, Museo Nacionale de Artes Decorativas, Madrid 22.05.2012 - 29.09.2012; Further exhibitions 2012 and 2013 in Spain: Las Naves, Valencia; Museo de Bellas Artes | Coruna, Spain.
- Der Kanzlerbungalow Photography by Igmar Kurth, Vernissage Friday 23.4.2010 06.00 p.m., Fondation Gutzwiller, Räffelstraße 24/7, 8045 Zürich, 24.4.-30.4.2010 Switzerland
- Architecture in the Realm of the Arts – 200 Years of the Academy of Fine Arts Munich 15.02.2008 - 18.05.2008 Architekturmuseum der TU München in der Pinakothek der Moderne
- 100 Years German Werkbund 1907|2007, 19.04.2007 - 26.08.2007, Architekturmuseum der Technischen Universität München in der Pinakothek der Moderne; Further Exhibitions i 100 Years German Werkbund: Architekturmuseums in der Akademie der Künste, Hanseatenweg, Berlin; Muzeum Architektury | Architekturmuseum Breslau; Cagdas Sanatlar Galerisi | Ankara; Mimar Sinan Güzel Sanatlar Üniversitesi | Istanbul; Macedonian Museum of Modern Art | Thessaloniki; Benaki Museum | Athens.
- Architektur der Wunderkinder, Ausstellung in Berlin, 09.12.2005 - 11.02.2006, Im Schinkelzentrum, Technische Universität Berlin, Fakultätsforum im Architekturgebäude am Ernst-Reuter-Platz
- Architektur der Wunderkinder: Aufbruch und Verdrängung in Bayern 1945 bis 1960, 03.02.2005 - 30.04.2005, Architekturmuseum der Technischen Universität München in der Pinakothek der Moderne
- Begreifbare Baukunst - Die Bedeutung von Türgriffen in der Architektur Museum August Kestner 30159 Hannover Trammplatz 3 Laufzeit: 13. Oktober 2011 bis 08. Januar 2012 Türgriffe und -knäufe u.a. von Walter Gropius, Le Corbusier und Sep Ruf
- "Begreifbare Baukunst - Die Bedeutung von Türgriffen in der Architektur" Termin: 29.11.2012 - 13.01.2013, Türgriffe und -knäufe u.a. von Karl Friedrich Schinkel, Josef Maria Olbrich, Walter Gropius, Sep Ruf und Le Corbusier, zudem Modelle u.a. prägender und lehrender Professoren der TU Dortmund. Dortmunder U - Zentrum für Kunst und Kreativität Leonie-Reygers-Terrasse, 44137 Dortmund
- Begreifbare Baukunst zur Bedeutung von Türgriffen in der Architektur, vom 20.November 2009 bis 13.Dezember 2009 im Roten Salon der Bauakademie, Schinkelplatz 1, Berlin
- Artur Pfau - Fotograf und Zeitzeuge Mannheims Reiss-Engelhorn-Museen. Museum Weltkulturen D5 68159 Mannheim Termin: 03.06.2012 - 29.07.2012 - Verlängert bis 27.01.2013
- Baukunst aus Raum und Licht - Sakrale Räume in der Architektur der Moderne, Museum Moderner Kunst - Wörlen Bräugasse 17 94032 Passau Termin: 24.03.2012 - 10.06.2012
- Nürnberg baut auf! Straßen. Plätze. Bauten Stadtmuseum Fembohaus Burgstraße 15 90403 Nürnberg Ausstellung vom 29.1.-20.6.2010
- 60 Jahre "Wie wohnen?" und 10 Jahre Markanto. Place of the exhibition: Markanto Depot, Mainzer Strasse 26, 50678 Köln Öffnungszeiten: September 2009, jeden Samstag von 11.00 bis 16.00 Uhr Based on zhe exhibition "Wie wohnen?" from 1949 in Stuttgart and 1950 in Karlsruhe, where examples of furnishing, constructional engineering and furniture of Egon Eiermann, Eduard Ludwig, Gustav Hasenflug, Hugo Häring, Sep Ruf or Jens Risom were shown.
- 100 Jahre Deutscher Werkbund 1907|2007 100 ANOS DE ARQUITETURA E DESIGN NA ALEMANHA 1907–2007 17.05.2013 - 27.07.2013 Fábrica Santo Thyrso | Santo Tirso, Portugal

== Awards ==
- 1952: Price of the city of Nuremberg
- 1958: Officer of the Order of Leopold (Belgium)
- 1973: Bavarian Order of Merit
- 1976: Theodor Heuss-Medaille
- 1976: Officer Cross of the Order of Merit of the Federal Republic of Germany
- 1978: Bonifatius-Medaille des Bistums Fulda
- 1980: Price of architecture of the city of Munich

== Literature ==
- Andreas Denk: Rufs Vermächtnis – Transformationen der Moderne, in: der architekt, 5/2008
- Helga Himen: Ruf, Sep. In: Neue Deutsche Biographie (NDB). Band 22. Duncker & Humblot, Berlin 2005, ISBN 3-428-11203-2, S. 231–233 (Digitalisat).
- Winfried Nerdinger in Zusammenarbeit mit Irene Meissner: Sep Ruf 1908–1982. Moderne mit Tradition. München 2008
- Sep Ruf 1908-1982: Leben und Werk Irene Meissner 2013
- Hans Wichmann: Sep Ruf. Bauten und Projekte. DVA, Stuttgart, 1986, ISBN 3-421-02851-6
- Der Bungalow, Paul Swiridoff, Wohn- und Empfangsgebäude für den Bundeskanzler in Bonn, Neske Verlag, Pfullingen 1967, Text von Erich Steingräber
- Der Kanzlerbungalow, Edition Axel Menges GmbH, 2009 - 47 Seiten at Google Books
- Andreas Schätzke/Joaquín Medina Warmburg: Sep Ruf. Kanzlerbungalow, Bonn, Edition Axel Menges, Stuttgart/London 2009, ISBN 978-3-932565-72-4 Book in English language: Sep Ruf, Kanzlerbungalow, Bonn
- Judith Koppetsch: Palais Schaumburg. Von der Villa zum Kanzlersitz 2013 Haus der Geschichte Bonn
- Georg Adlbert: Der Kanzlerbungalow. Erhaltung, Instandsetzung, Neunutzung, Krämer, Stuttgart 2010 (2. erw. Aufl.), ISBN 978-3-7828-1536-9
- Andreas Denk, Ingeborg Flagge: Architekturführer Bonn. Dietrich Reimer Verlag, Berlin 1997, ISBN 3-496-01150-5, S. 84.
- Georg Adlbert, Volker Busse, Hans Walter Hütter, Judith Koppetsch, Wolfgang Pehnt, Heinrich Welfing, Udo Wengst (Autoren), Stiftung Haus der Geschichte der Bundesrepublik Deutschland/Wüstenrot Stiftung Ludwigsburg (Hg.): Kanzlerbungalow, Prestel, München 2009, ISBN 978-3-7913-5027-1
- Burkhard Körner: Der Kanzlerbungalow von Sep Ruf in Bonn. In: Bonner Geschichtsblätter. Band 49/50, Bonn 1999/2000 (2001), ISSN 0068-0052, S. 507–613.
- Egon Eiermann/ Sep Ruf, Deutsche Pavilions: Brussel 1958 at Google Books
- The Architecture of Expo 58 by Rika Devos & Mil De Kooning (eds). Dexia/Mercatorfonds, 2006
- Helmut Vogt: Wächter der Bonner Republik. Die Alliierten Hohen Kommissare 1949–1955, Verlag Ferdindand Schöningh, Paderborn 2004, ISBN 3-506-70139-8, S. 99, 102, 103–118.
- Andreas Denk, Ingeborg Flagge: Architekturführer Bonn. Dietrich Reimer Verlag, Berlin 1997, ISBN 3-496-01150-5, S. 79.
- Herbert Strack, Spaziergang durch das 1100 Jahre alte Muffendorf, Bad Godesberg 1988
- Andrea M. Kluxen: Die Geschichte der Kunstakademie in Nürnberg 1662–1998, in: Jahrbuch für fränkische Landesforschung 59 (1999), 167–207.
- Michael Diefenbacher, Rudolf Endres, ed. (2000), Nuremberg City Lexicon (Stadtlexikon Nürnberg) (in German) (2nd, revised ed.), Nuremberg: W. Tümmels Verlag, ISBN 3-921590-69-8
- Franz Winzinger (Red.): 1662–1962, Dreihundert Jahre Akademie der bildenden Künste in Nürnberg. Nürnberg 1962
- Bernward Deneke, Rainer Kahsnitz (Hrsg.): Das Germanische Nationalmuseum. Nürnberg 1852–1977. Beiträge zu seiner Geschichte. München/Berlin 1978 (umfassender Sammelband zu allen Aspekten und Einrichtungen des Museums).
- Schatzkammer der Deutschen. Aus den Sammlungen des Germanischen Nationalmuseums Nürnberg. Nürnberg 1982
- The Transparent State: Architecture And Politics In Postwar Germany by Deborah Ascher Barnstone
- Minimalism in Germany. The sixties - Minimalismus in Deutschland. Die 1960er Jahre" Neuerscheinung 2012 Daimler Contemporary Art Collection, Berlin Editor: Renate Wiehager für die Daimler AG, architecture: page 459-467, author: Susannah Cremer-Bermbach
- "Architektur der Wunderkinder: Aufbruch und Verdrängung in Bayern 1945 - 1960" hg. Winfried Nerdinger in Zusammenarbeit mit Inez Florschütz, Katalog zur Ausstellung in der Pinakothek der Moderne, München, Gebundene Ausgabe: 358 Seiten Verlag: Pustet, Salzburg; 2005
- "350 Jahre Akademie der Bildenden Künste Nürnberg" Herausgeber: Akademie der Bildenden Künste Nürnberg 2012 ISBN 978-3-86984-351-3, Verschiedene Beiträge, u.a. von Irene Meissner : "Die Akademie der Bildenden Künste in Nürnberg - Ein Hauptwerk der deutschen Nachkriegsarchitektur von Sep Ruf"
- "Aufbruch! Architektur der Fünfzigerjahre in Deutschland", Prestel, 160 Seiten
