= Omnitracker =

- Developer: Omninet
- Stable release: 12.1.0 / March 31, 2021; 5 years ago
- Written in: C# + .NET, C++
- Operating system: Windows
- Available in: German, English, French, Russian, Dutch, Polish, Czech
- Type: Business process management, Business service management, ITIL
- License: Proprietary commercial software
- Website: www.omnitracker.com

Omnitracker is a proprietary business process platform developed by Omninet GmbH in Germany. Omnitracker is developed as modular software for medium and large companies. It is used to track, control and evaluate relevant business processes. The main area of application is the support of ITIL compliant processes, which manage requests, incidents/ errors, customer inquiries from the moment of creation to completion. Omnitracker received certifications of the Federal Association of IT-Mittelstand and Pink Elephant that covers nine processes.

== History ==
Omnitracker was developed by the privately owned company Omninet GmbH, based in Eckental located close to Nuremberg in 1998. Initially Omninet's focus was on quality management and software development processes. Omnitracker has since expanded across industries and modularly for business process platforms. In 2000, the focus on service management processes according to ITIL has been implemented in the Omnitracker. Numerous international clients use Omnitracker as mission-critical system in different service and technical processes. Omnitracker 2012 has been classified by the analyst group, Info-Tech Research Group as a 'Value Champion' software.

== Orientation ==
The Omnitracker platform and applications automate IT-based workflows and are used by B2B customers in multiple industries such as Industrial companies, service organizations, IT service providers and government agencies. Omnitracker is used by several hundred installations. Notable clients include DB (German Railways), DATEV, Daimler, the German Patent and Trademark Office, SANYO, Siemens, tesa, NATO, and Belgian Defence.

== Development and sales ==
The system development and the international support are operated exclusively in the parent company located in Eckental Germany. Sales are made directly through Omninet and via Omninet's partners.

== Functions ==
The multitenant Omnitracker platform consists of a base system, modular base components and clients. Unlimited user-specific extensions can be configured and controlled via open interfaces. The system has its own graphical workflow editor; rule-based notifications and escalations. The data model as well as the rights and role concept are freely configurable. Reports and statistics can also be automated.

== Individual modules ==
Currently Omnitracker has 12 business process platform based applications, IT Service Management Center V3 (ITSM) - for control of ITIL-compliant IT service management processes and customer service processes, Project Management Center - Project Planning and Control, Stock & Order Management - support the ordering and delivery process, Contract Management Center - to support contract management and Systems Engineering Center - management of software development processes (ALM).

== Licensing ==
The licensing model is modular for the basic server components and concurrent based on (simultaneous) users. Additional to the classic license purchase, an optional license renting and a pay-per-use model (depending on actual usage time) is provided.
