= Sustris =

Sustris is a surname. Notable people with the surname include:

- Friedrich Sustris (c. 1540 – 1600), Italian-Dutch painter, decorator and architect, son of Lambert
- Lambert Sustris (c. 1515/1520 – c. 1584), Dutch painter active mainly in Venice
