= Omninet =

German software development company

Omninet Holding GmbH
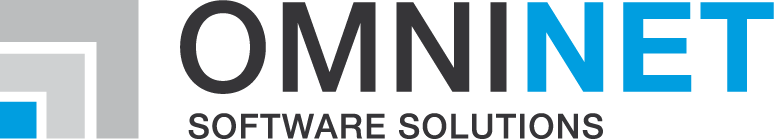
- Type: GmbH
- Industry: Software development
- Founder: Joachim Lenzer
- Headquarters: Eckental, Germany
- Area served: Worldwide
- Products: Omnitracker
- Number of employees: ca. 150
- Website: www.omnitracker.com

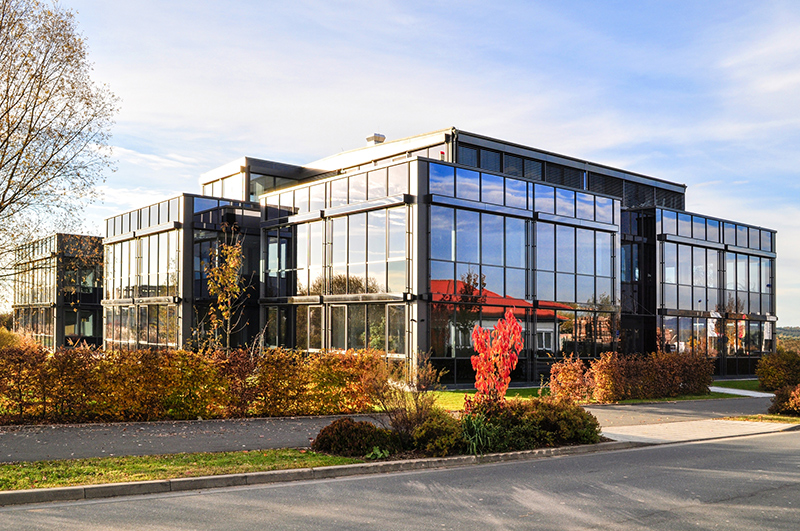
Omninet Headquarters in Eckental, near Nuremberg, Germany

Omninet, headquartered in Eckental, Germany in the region of Nuremberg, is a medium-sized software development company known as an international orientation innovator in the area of business process management software. Its subsidiaries and offices are located in Austria, Switzerland, Belgium, the Netherlands, and Russia; it has also a sales office in the United States. Omninet is a Microsoft Gold partner.

== History ==
The company was founded in 1993 as OMNINET Germany as a partnership in 1995, and converted into a GmbH. In 2005, the setting up of subsidiaries started abroad. In 2010, the Omninet Group had 90 employees and 2014, about 150.

== Operation ==
Omninet develops and sells the business process platform called Omnitracker. Omninet 2012 was evaluated by analysts Info-Tech Research Group as one of the world's leading ITSM tool vendor and classified as an 'Innovator' in Enterprise Service Desk. In the market research for 2017, the German analyst "Research in Action" compared the 20 best of about 250 providers of IT and Enterprise Management Software in Germany and placed Omninet in third place. Some notable customers include DB (German Railways), DATEV, Daimler, the German Patent and Trademark Office, SANYO, Siemens, Tesa, NATO.

== Products ==
Omninet develops the modular business process platform Omnitracker. Omnitracker provides components and applications that serve the automation of IT-based workflows to B2B customers across industries such as Industrial companies, service organizations, IT service providers and authorities.
