= Theo Pabst =

German architect (1905–1979)

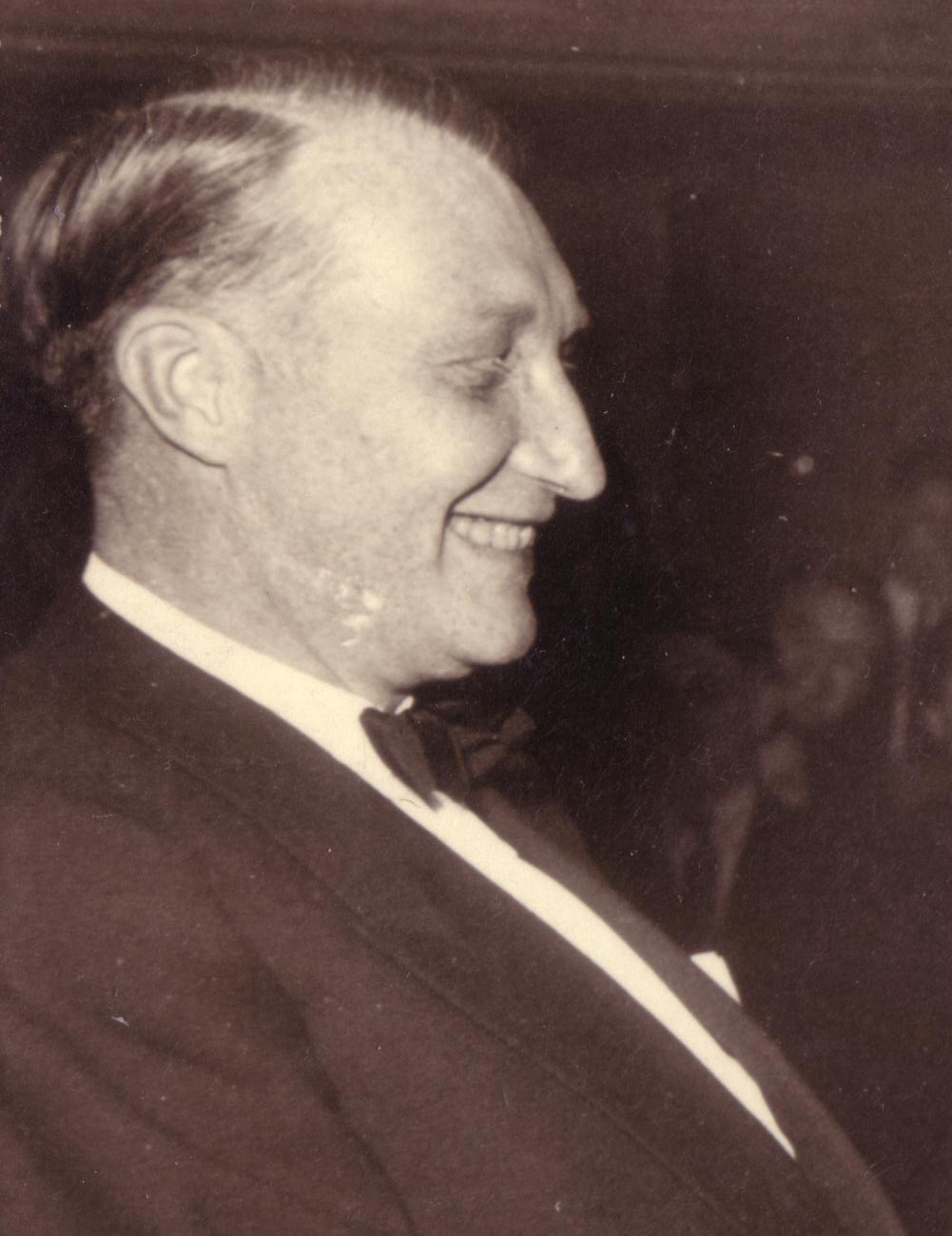
- Born: 15 January 1905; Passau, German Empire
- Died: 4 October 1979 (aged 74); Munich, West Germany
- Education: Technical University of Munich
- Occupations: Architect; civil servant; professor

Theodor Pabst (15 January 1905 – 4 October 1979) was a German architect, civil servant and professor.

== Early life and education ==
Theodor Pabst was born in Passau, the son of Royal Bavarian State Railways surveyor Theodor Pabst. In 1910, his father was transferred to Regensburg, where the family would experience World War I and the post-war period. In 1921, the family moved to Munich.

In the winter of 1924, Pabst began studying architecture at the Technical University of Munich under professors Theodor Fischer and German Bestelmeyer. He graduated in 1929.

== Career ==
After graduating, Pabst worked as a construction trainee at the Munich Oberpostdirektion under Oberbaurat Franz Holzhammer. There he completed the government builder state exam in 1931. Unable to find work, he moved to the office of his fellow student Albert Heinrich Steiner in Zürich.

On May 1, 1933, Pabst joined the Nazi Party, allegedly to be able to participate in competitions and improve his chances of finding employment. He was a caretaker and block helper for the National Socialist People's Welfare. He was drafted into military service several times in World War II. From 1941 to 1945, he was a major in the Luftwaffe Building Council in Russia. In his memoirs, Pabst did not speak on his exact activities as a construction officer for the Luftwaffe.

== Later life ==
In 1948, on the recommendation of Ernst Neufert, Pabst became a substitute architecture professor at the Technische Universität Darmstadt. He received a full time teaching position on 17 June 1949, and taught at the TU Darmstadt until 1972.

Pabst died in Munich on 4 October 1979.

== Selected works ==
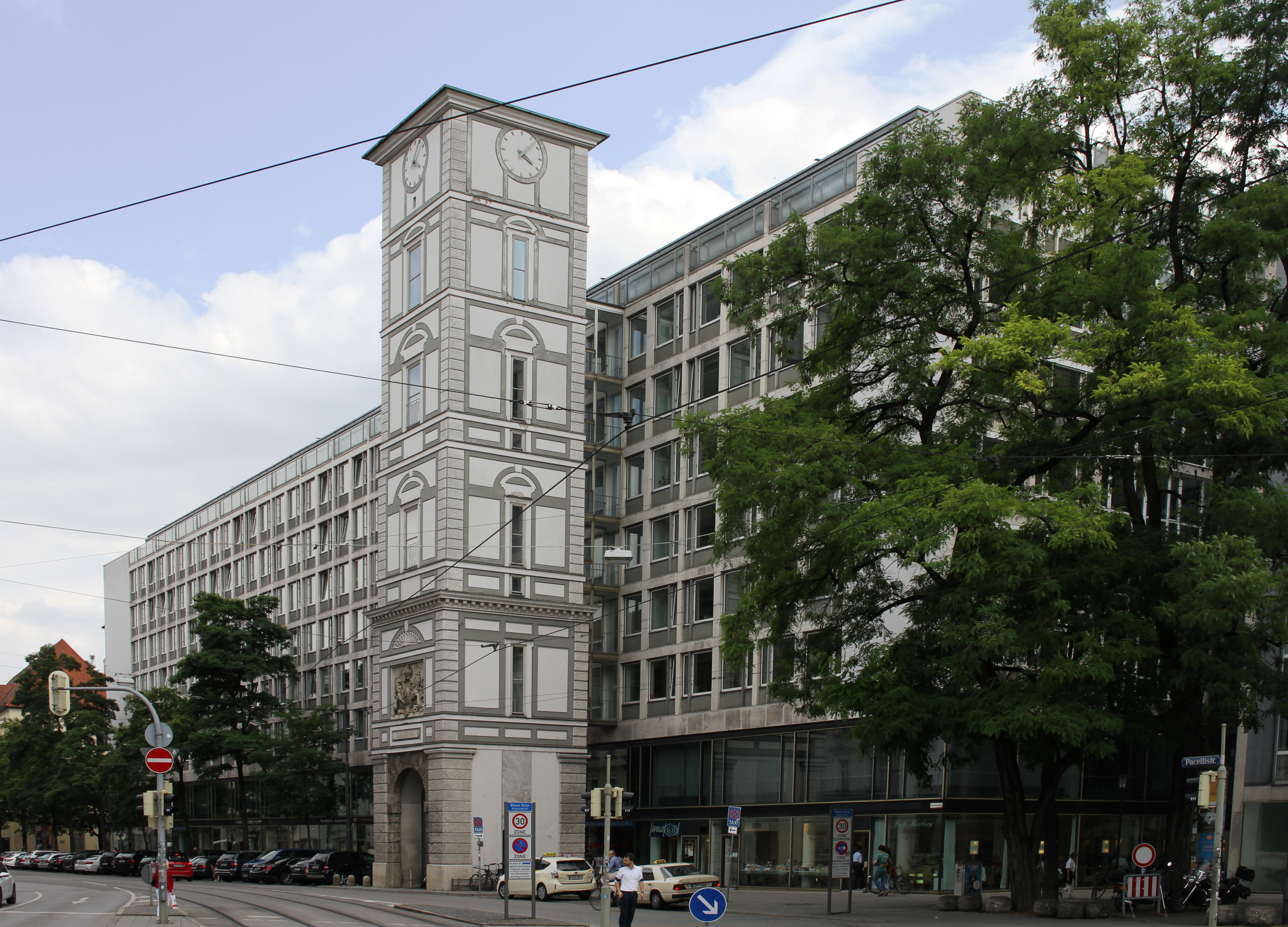
Neue Maxburg in Munich

- 1933–1934: Fliegerhorst Göppingen
- 1934: Nazi Mustersiedlung in Munich
- 1954–1955: Institut für Massivbau at the Technische Universität Darmstadt
- 1950–1951: Merckhaus in Darmstadt
- 1950–1951: Galeria Kaufhof in Munich
- 1953: Haus Schlotter in Darmstadt
- 1953–1957: Neue Maxburg in Munich (with Sep Ruf)
- 1956–1957: Kunsthalle Darmstadt
- 1960–1965: Neustädter Rathaus in Hanau
- 1964–1966: Mannheimer Kunstverein
