= Herzog-Max-Burg =

Former building in Munich, Germany

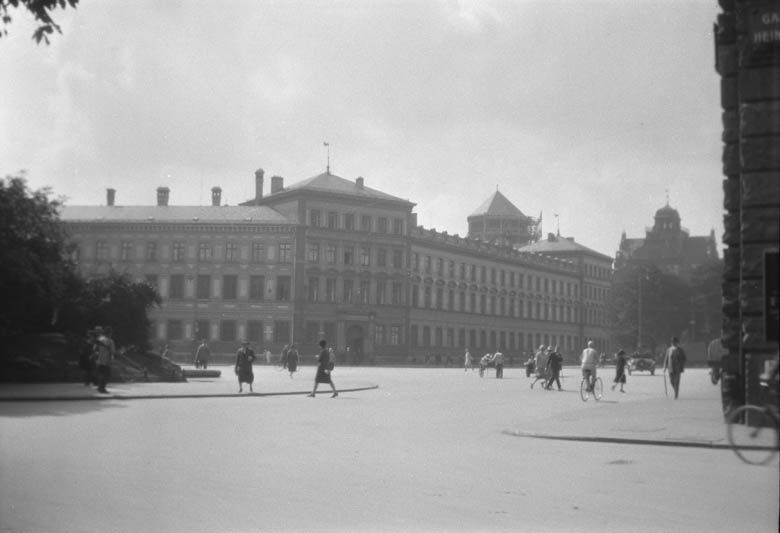
- Herzog-Max-Burg in 1928
- Interactive map of the Herzog-Max-Burg area

General information
- Status: Destroyed; rebuilt in 1957 as Neue Maxburg
- Architectural style: Renaissance
- Location: Pacellistraße 5 Munich, Germany
- Coordinates: 48.1407°N 11.5699°E
- Construction started: 1593
- Demolished: 1949

Design and construction
- Architects: Friedrich Sustris; Wendel Dietrich

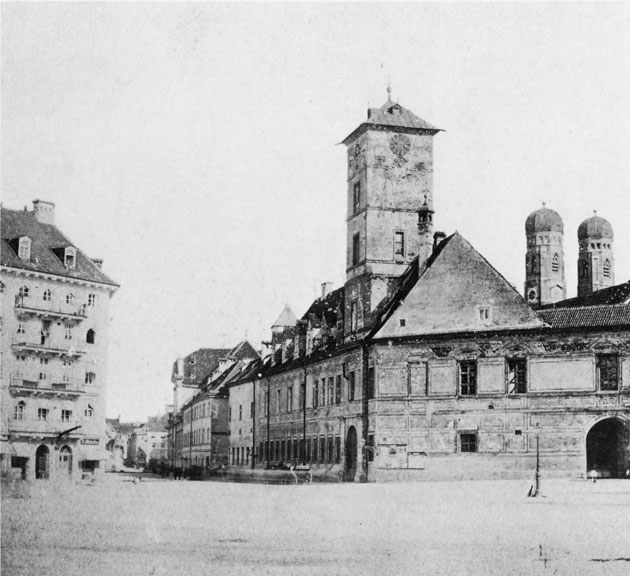
Herzog-Max-Burg in 1860

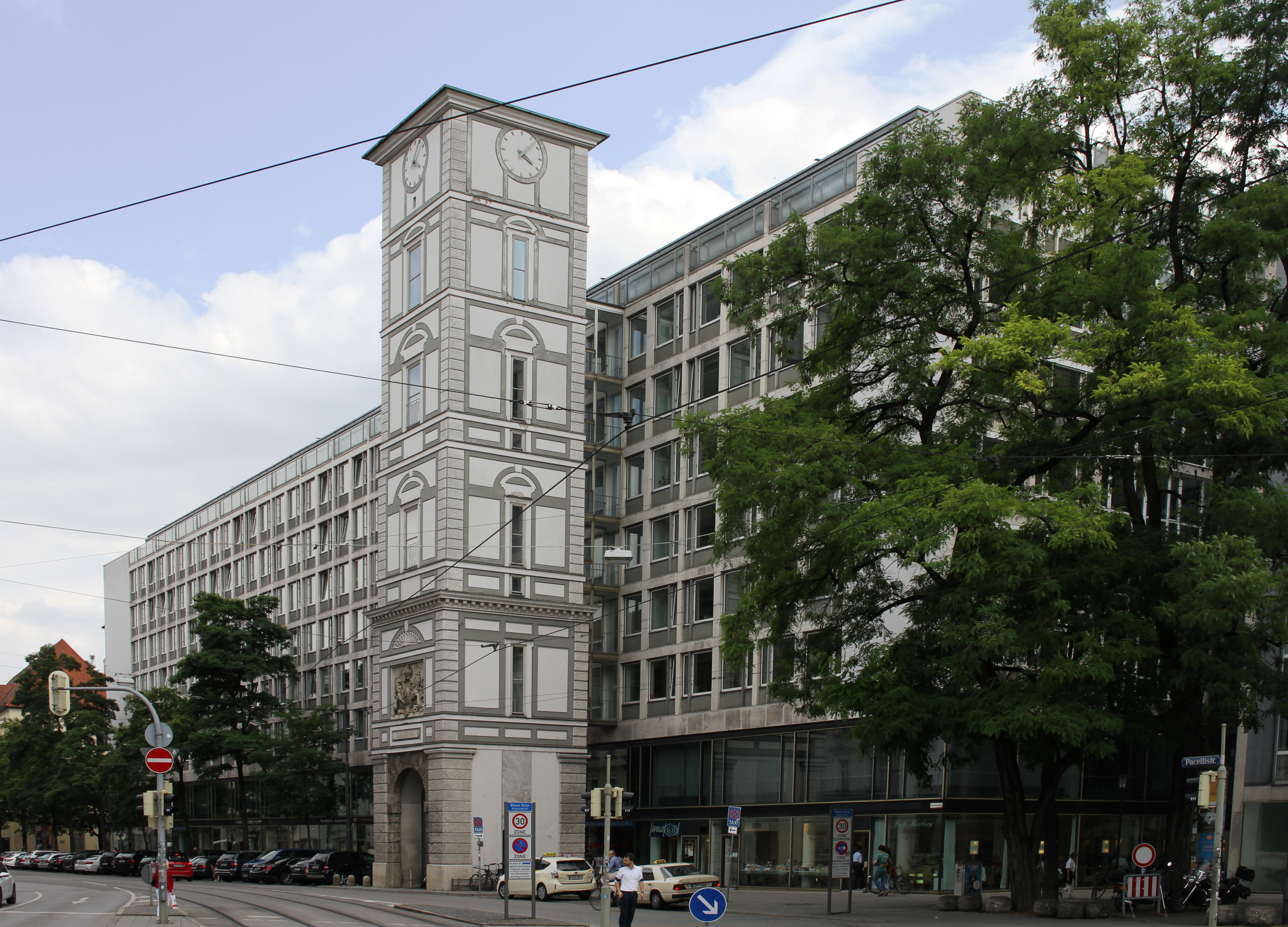
Neue Maxburg, with the surviving tower of Herzog-Max-Burg

Herzog-Max-Burg, also known as Maxburg and Wilhelminische Veste, was a Renaissance-style building complex in Munich, Germany. It was almost completely destroyed in World War II, but was later rebuilt in the 1950s. The reconstruction, named Neue Maxburg, currently houses several courthouses in Munich.

== History ==
Herzog-Max-Burg was built for William V, Duke of Bavaria in 1593. It was designed by Friedrich Sustris and Wendel Dietrich, and its namesake was likely Maximilian Philipp Hieronymus, Duke of Bavaria-Leuchtenberg. In later years, the building housed many members of the House of Wittelsbach before its residence function was abandoned in favor of accommodating state authorities and institutions.

Herzog-Max-Burg was severely damaged by Allied bombs in April 1944, with only the tower—called Max-Turm—surviving. After the war, discussions between state and city building offices and historic preservationists resulted in the decision to tear down all remnants of the building except the surviving tower.

== Neue Maxburg ==
From 1954 to 1957, Neue Maxburg was rebuilt around the surviving tower based on modernist designs by Sep Ruf and Theo Pabst. The progressive design proved controversial in post-war Munich as outspoken traditionalists rejected the trend of oversized Western-style buildings making their way into the cityscape. In the project's planning stages, some members of the conservative Bavarian Architecture Commission referred to the designs as "hard, American, and not characteristic of Munich."

Neue Maxburg currently houses several courthouses in Munich.
