= Friedrich Sustris =

Italian painter

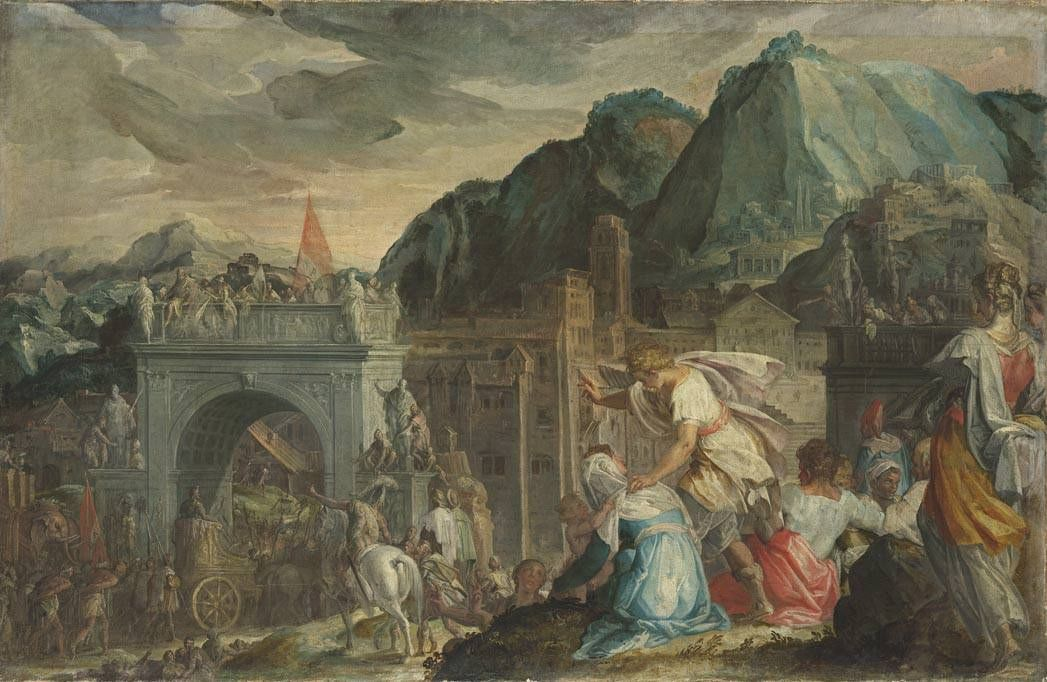
Sustris: Triumphal procession of Marius over Jugurtha (c. 1580/90?)

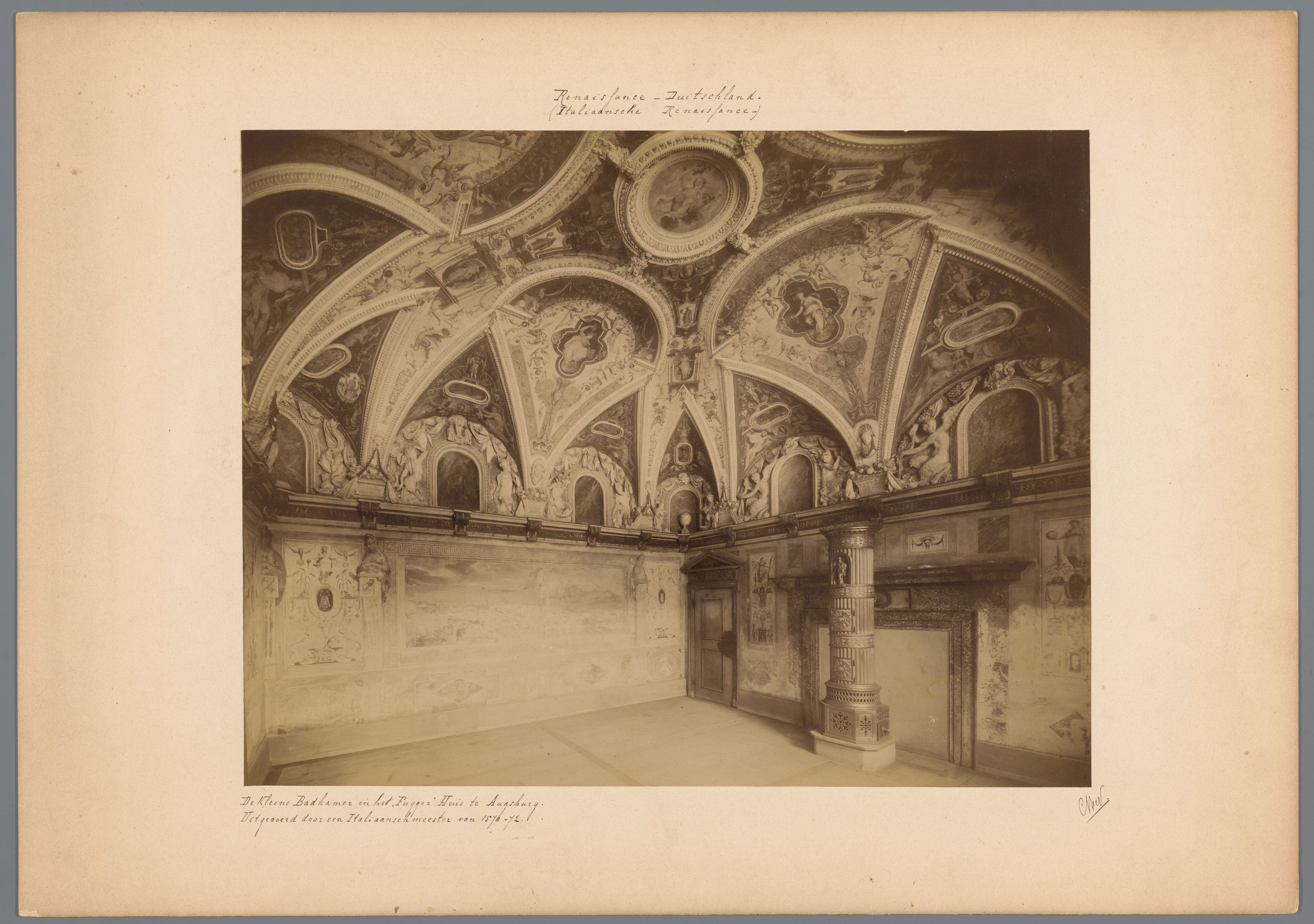
Sogennnate Badstuben in the house of Hans Fugger in Augsburg (1569-1573)

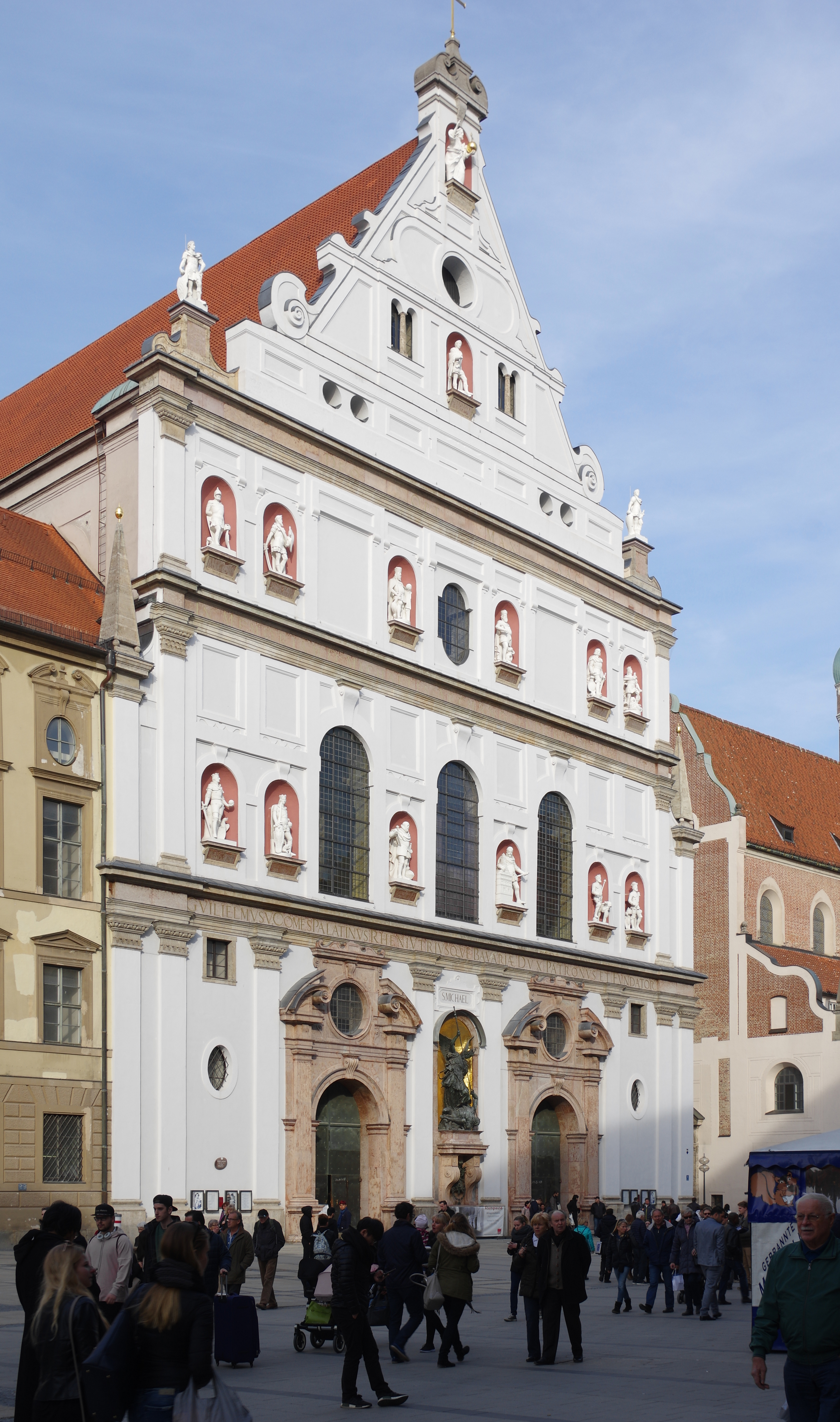
St Michael in Munich (1583-1597)

Friedrich Sustris (c. 1540, in Padua – 1600, in Munich) was an Italian-Dutch painter, decorator and architect. He was a son of the artist Lambert Sustris, who worked in Italy.

Sustris got his training from his father Lambert in Venice and Padua. From 1563 to 1567 he was trained by Giorgio Vasari in Florence, after he had returned from a stay in Rome in 1560. His first patron was Hans Fugger who ordered the decoration of the Fugger mansion in Venice. He was the son-in-law of Jan Kraeck.

After his training, in 1569 he received his first independent commission in Germany: Hans Fugger engaged him to decorate the newly built rear wing of the Fugger houses in Augsburg with the Badstuben (cabinets for his art collection). Until 1573 he worked in Augsburg with several assistants, including Carlo di Cesare del Palagio. This is also when his collaboration with the Augsburg cabinet-maker Wendel Dietrich began.

After completing this commission, in 1573 Sustris entered the service of the Bavarian ducal heir William V (Wilhelm V) as painter, architect, and artistic director. One of his principal assignments was to oversee the remodelling of Trausnitz Castle above Landshut, where he worked together with the master builder Georg Stern the Younger.

When William V took power and moved to the ducal residence, he brought Sustris to Munich in 1579 and put him in charge of all major artistic projects at court. In 1583 Sustris was appointed court painter and chief architect. He introduced the formal language of Italian Mannerism from Florence to Munich and thus played a key role in establishing the city as the leading German art centre of the late Renaissance. After the duke’s abdication in 1597, Sustris continued in his personal service.

In Munich Sustris contributed to the decoration of the Antiquarium of the Munich Residenz and laid out the adjoining Grotto Courtyard.

Between 1583 and 1597 his most important and best-known work was created: the Jesuit church of St Michael and the adjacent college, again in collaboration with Wendel Dietrich.

From 1593, Sustris worked at the Herzog-Max-Burg in Munich.

Sustris died in 1600.

== Gallery ==
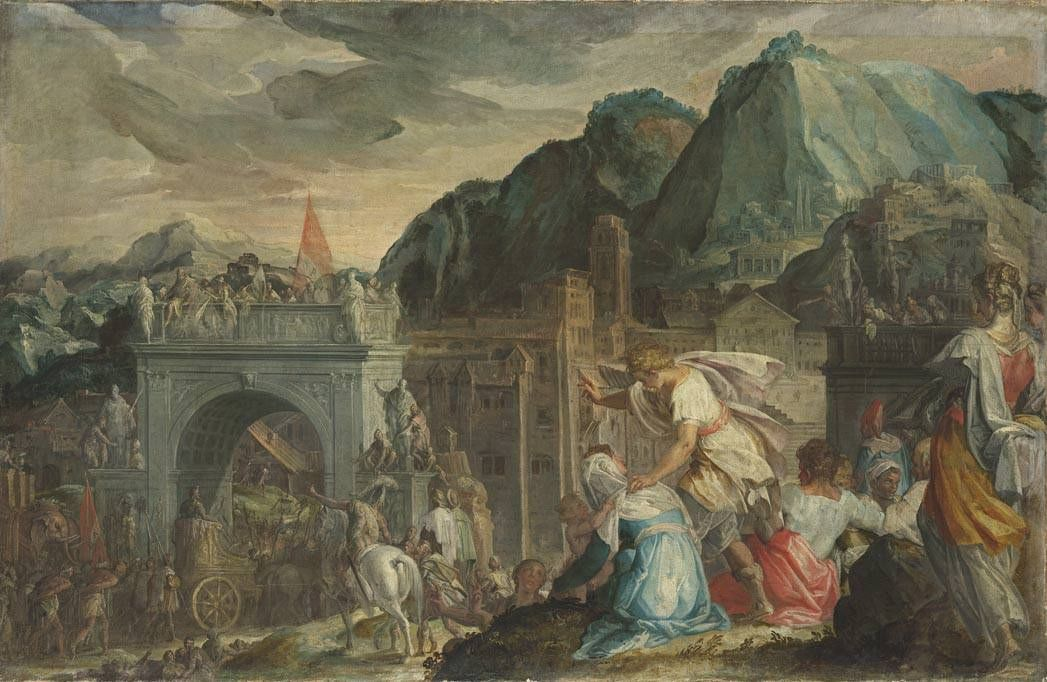
Triumphal procession of Marius over Jugurtha

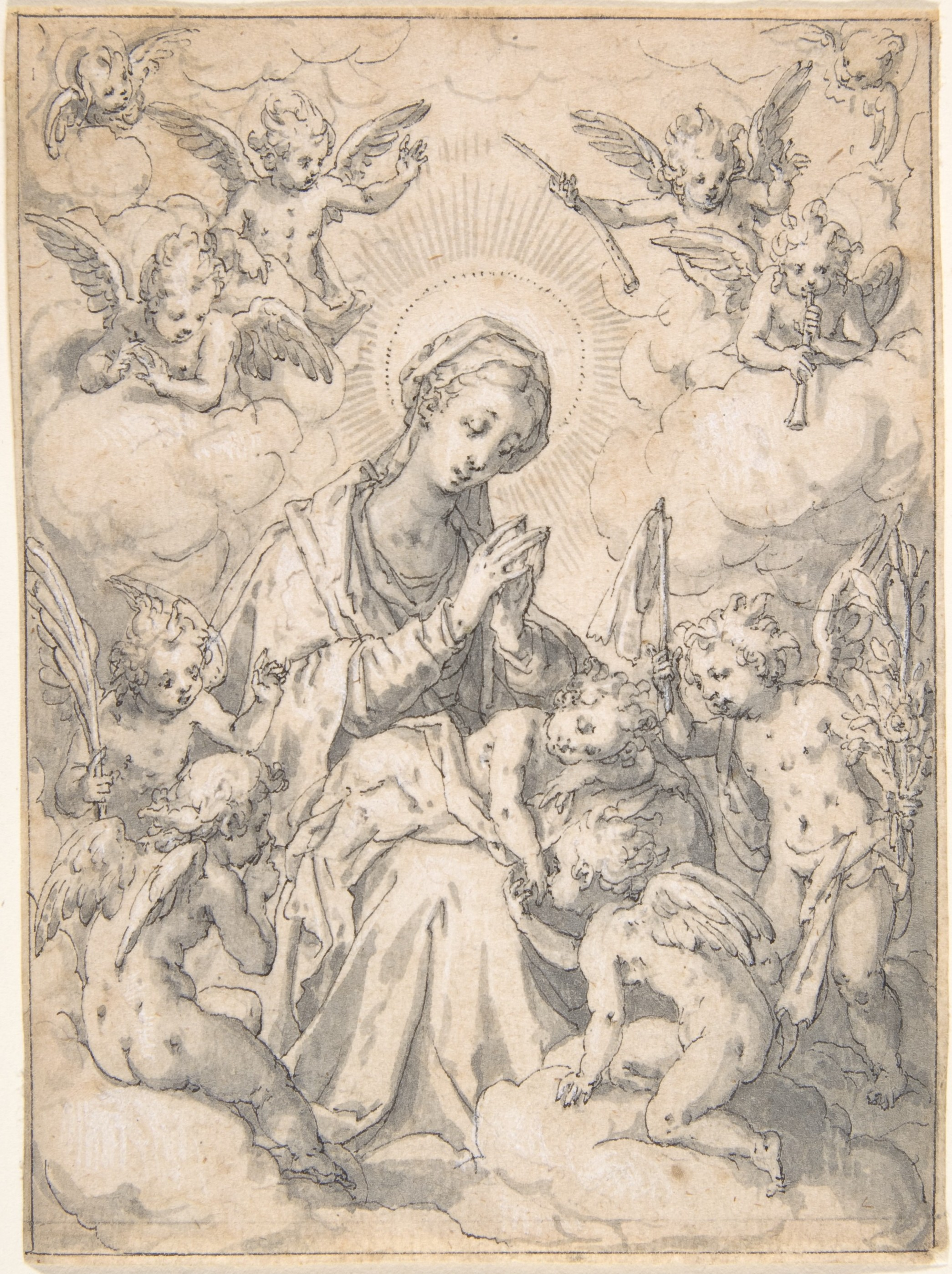
The Virgin and Child Surrounded by Little Angels in the Clouds (circa 1590)

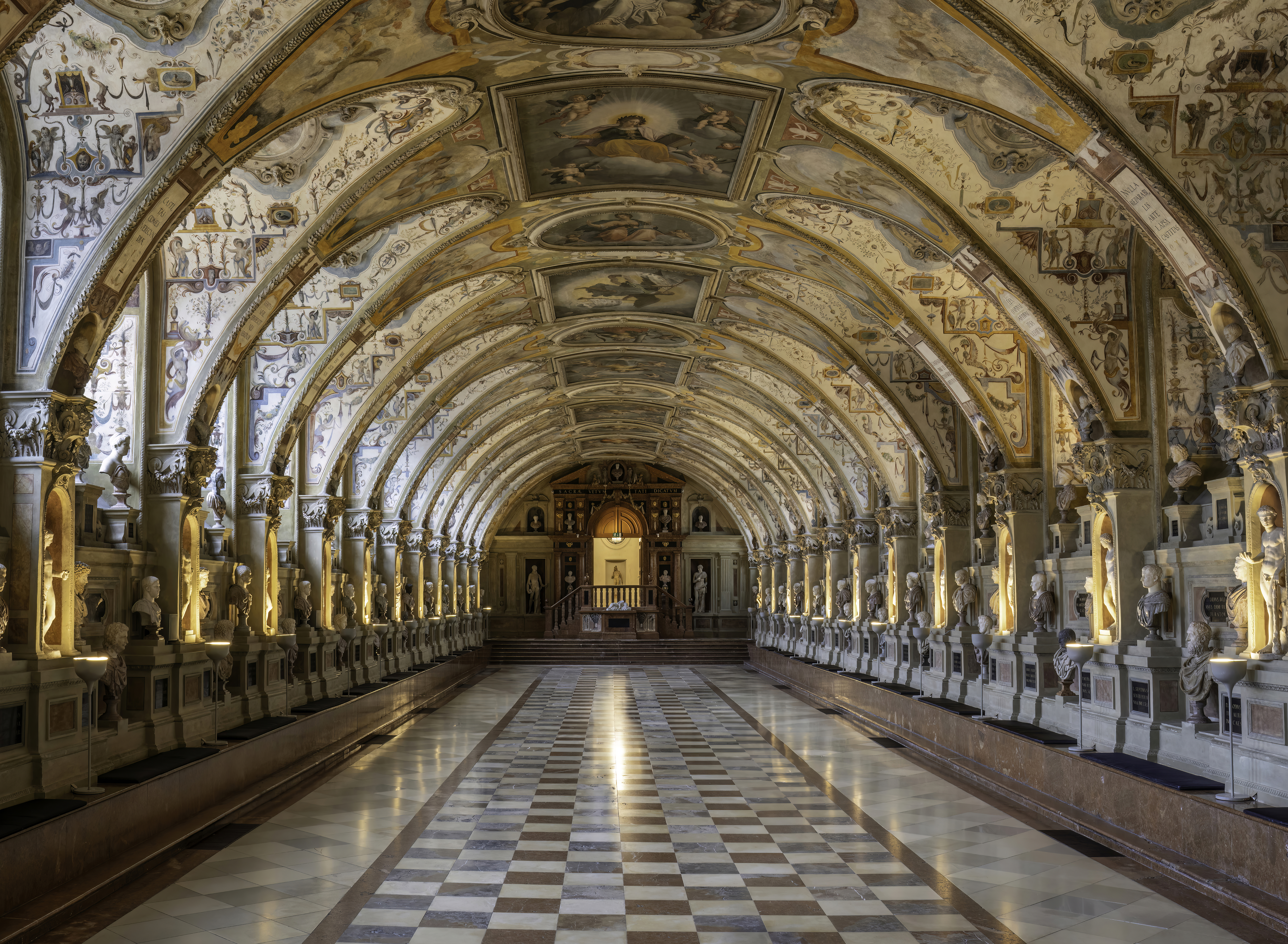
Antiquarium at the Munich Residenz (c 1585-1590)

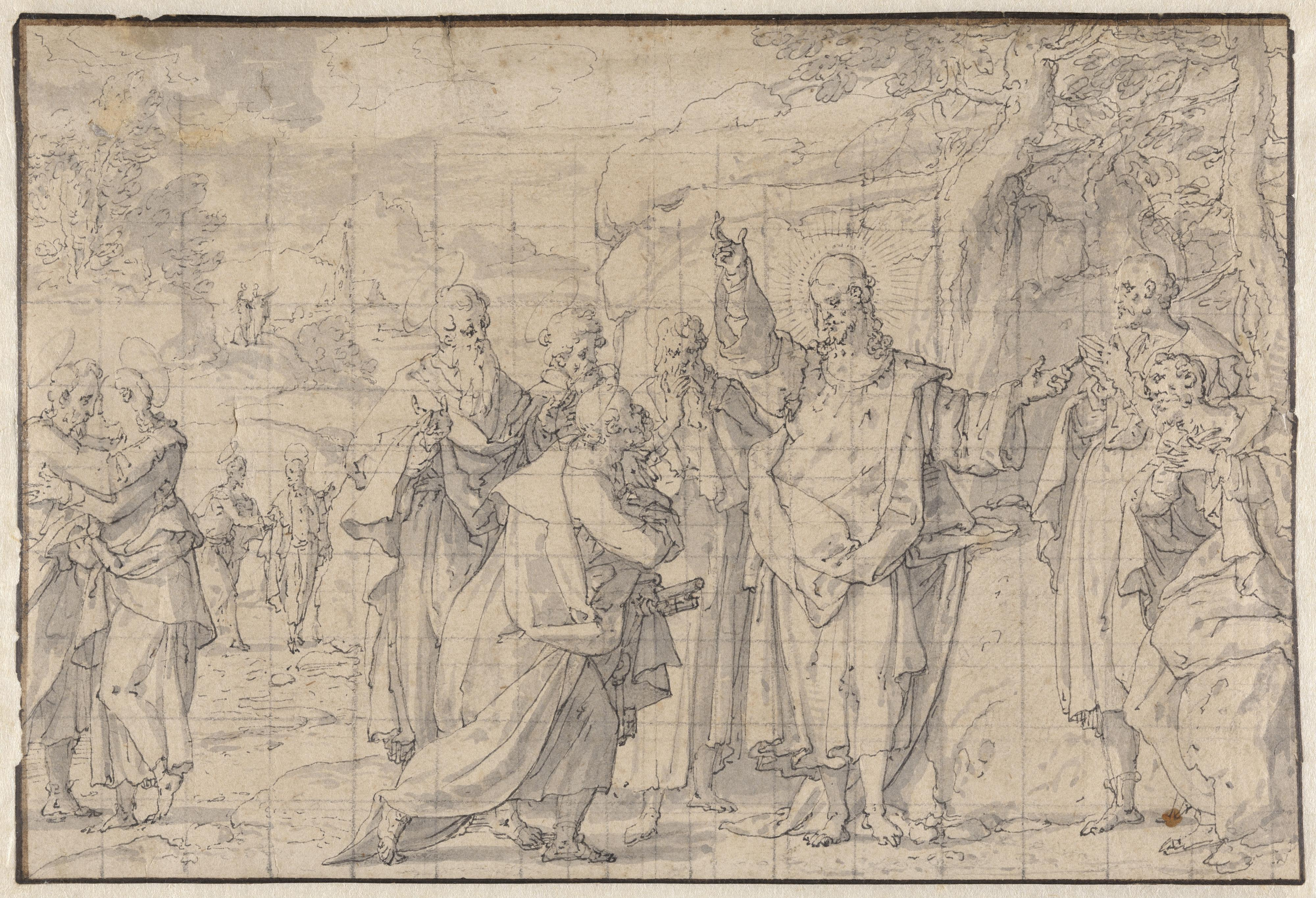
Christ handing the Keys to Saint Peter

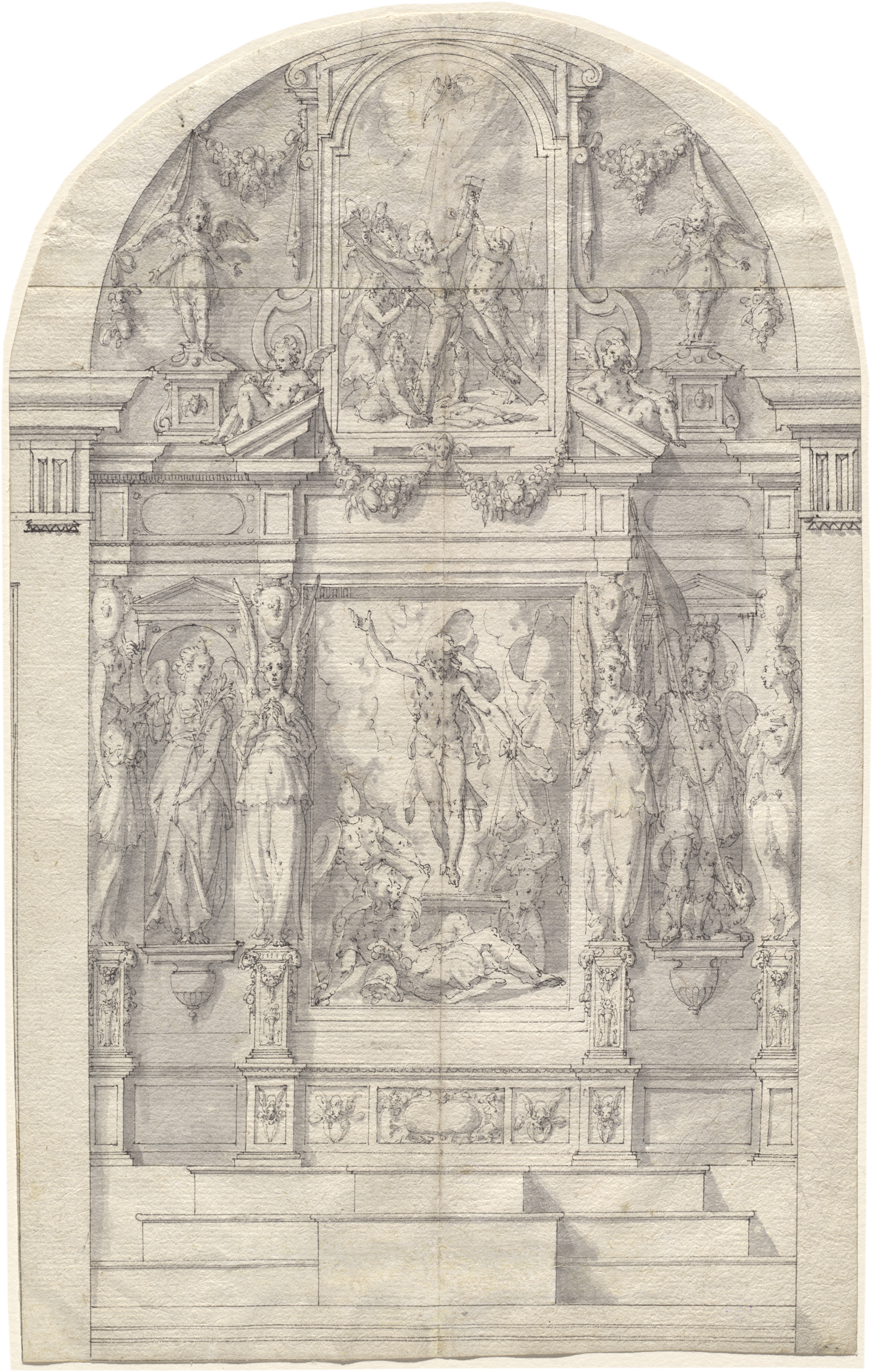
Altar with the Resurrection of Christ and the Martyrdom of Saint Andrew (1570-1580)
