= Eingetragene Genossenschaft =

An "eG" or eingetragene Genossenschaft is a "registered cooperative society" under German Law. Unregistered cooperatives are also possible in Germany but practically never used in practice. In 2004 there were 5470 registered cooperative societies.

"eG"'s are relatively rare commercial entities in Germany.

In some ways they're similar to registered associations (i.e. "eV" or eingetragener Verein) except for the fact that an "eG" may carry out "commercial operations" whereas a "registered association" (i.e. club) is specifically restricted under German law Section §21 of the German Civil Code or "Bürgerliches Gesetzbuch(BGB)" to being a "non-economic association" i.e. it may not carry out any commercial business operations.

They are a special form of commercial association established to reduce barriers of entry for specific activities that lie in the public interest. The "eG" seems like a mixture of capital (especially Company) and an association.

These organizations have limited liability for their members with regard to debt repayment. The private assets of "eG" members can never be called on by the "eG" or its creditors to pay for a debts that the "eG" may incur. Under the "eG" rules it is also possible that certain funding commitments of its members also repaid in the case of a bankruptcy. Participants in an "eG" must be legal "members" of their "eG". In addition, "eG"'s are subject to compulsory audits under law. Mandatory membership and audit costs can be considerable financial burdens for new and small cooperatives.

The organization must promote the interests or business of its members, or their social or cultural interest through their joint operation under Section §1 of the German Cooperative Society Act or "Genossenschaft Gesetz(GenG)" It is a legal person under Section §17 of the German Cooperative Society Act or "Genossenschaft Gesetz(GenG)" and Under German commercial law an eG is recognized as a form of merchant. Section §2 of the German Commercial Law Act or "Handelsgesetzbuch(HGB)".
