= Haus Carstanjen =

Coordinates: 50°42′16″N 7°09′47″E

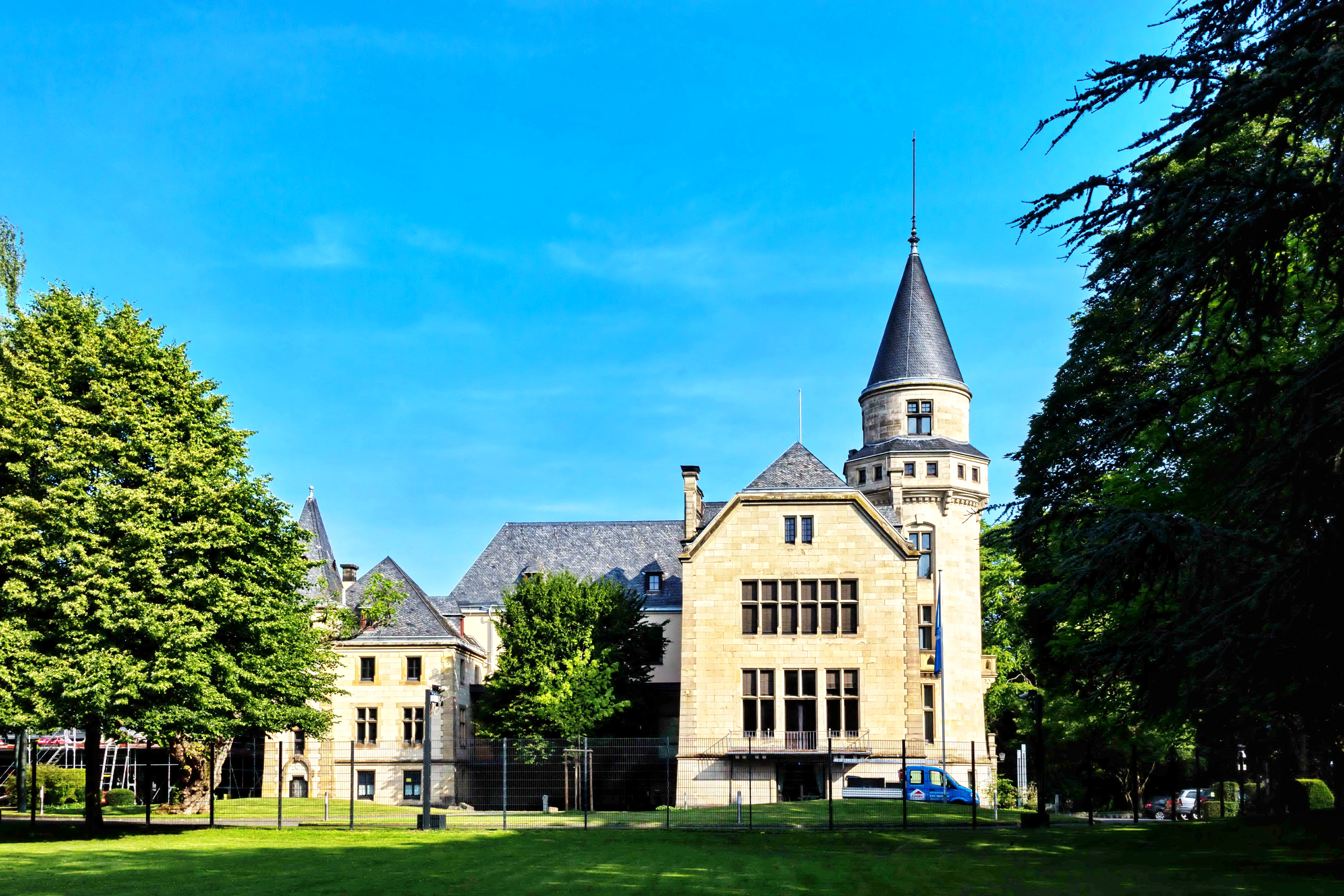
Haus Carstanjen in Bonn

Haus Carstanjen is a castle on the River Rhine in Plittersdorf, Bad Godesberg, a district of Bonn, Germany.

== History ==
The original building dates back to 1716. In 1881 Wilhelm Adolf von Carstanjen (1825–1900, ennobled 1881) acquired the building which he rebuilt into its present classical castle form. After 1950 it was occupied by the German Federal Government. From 1950 until 1957 it housed the Bundesministerium für Angelegenheiten des Marshallplanes (the Federal Ministry for the Marshall Plan), from 1957 until its dissolution in 1969 the Bundesschatzministerium (Treasury) and, until 1999, the Bundesministerium der Finanzen (Federal Ministry of Finance).

In the 1970s the Carstanjen family sold the grounds to the Federal government, including what is now the Rheinauen Park, and more buildings were built. At this time the grounds took on the nickname 'Schiller Park', after the former federal finance minister and house Mr. Karl Schiller.

Starting in 1996, after German reunification, many government ministries moved to Berlin, and the offices at Haus Carstanjen were assigned to United Nations agencies. The federal government renovated the complex at a cost of seven million euros. From the summer of 2006 many of the UN organisations relocated to a new campus in the renovated Langer Eugen tower, leaving the UNFCCC secretariat resident in Haus Carstanjen. In November 2015, the German Federal Government welcomed the United Nations System Staff College - Knowledge Centre for Sustainable Development in Haus Carstanjen.

== Building details ==
The original castle consists of an angular, Neo-Gothic three-story building, with two circular turrets, roofed conically in grey slate, mullioned windows, and colonnaded galleries.

A new extension, dating from 1967, consists of two low detached blocks and a seven-story block, and a detached restaurant. The modern office buildings are of reinforced concrete frame construction, extensively glazed with steel sun blinds, connected by glazed steel walkways.

== Wilhelm Adolf Carstanjen ==
Wilhelm Adolf von Carstanjen was born on 24 October 1825 in Duisburg, to a wealthy tobacco dealer, trader and shipper. In 1849 he moved to Cologne where he set up a cane sugar refinery with other family members. His business merged with that of the vom Rath family in 1855, and then Carl Joest & Sons, and he took a seat on the board of the resulting "Rhine Sugar Production Company", a position cemented by his marriage to Adele Adolf Carstanjen vom Rath. He supported Kaiser Wilhelm I during the Franco-Prussian War, and received into the Prussian nobility in 1881.

In 1881 he bought farmland by the Rhine near Plittersdorf and rebuilt the farm into a residential castle, which he named Haus Carstanjan. However, at that time he moved with his family to Berlin, and the Haus was only occasionally used. He commissioned a classical mausoleum between 1894 and 1896 on the grounds of the Plittersdorf estate, where he was interred after his death on 24 June 1900.

Carstanjen was a skilled collector and filled his residences in Cologne, Bad Godesberg, Plittersdorf and Berlin with Old Masters by Frans Hals, Rembrandt van Rijn, Aelbert Cuyp, and with antique furniture, wall tapestries, arms and armour, which his agents sourced from across Germany and auctions in Paris and London. On his death some of his art collection found its way to museums in Berlin and Cologne.

Adolf and Adele had three children, the youngest son, Robert, published a family chronicle in 1934.

== Carstanjen mausoleum ==
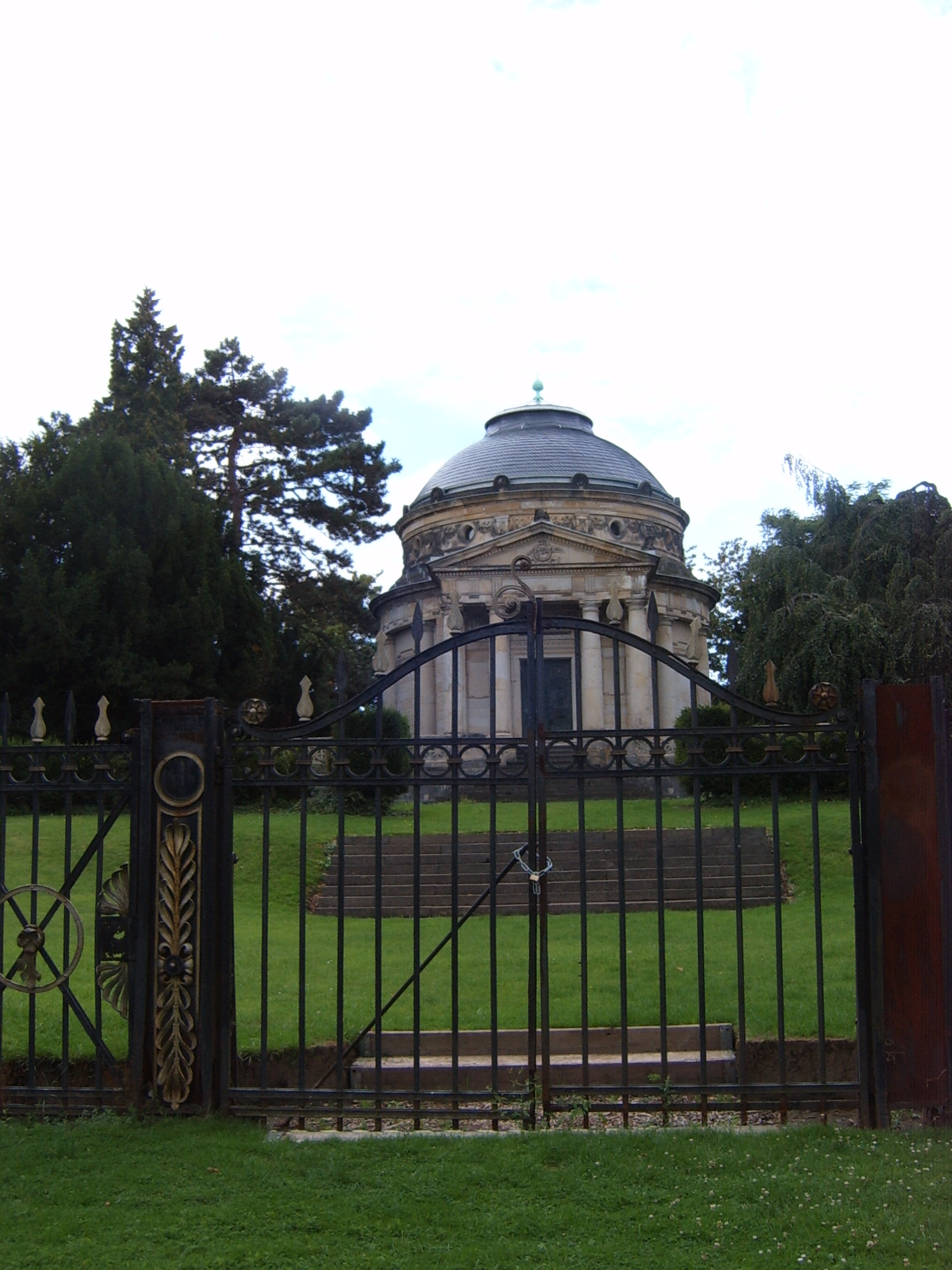

To the south of Haus Carstanjen, facing the River Rhine is the Carstanjen family mausoleum. It takes the form of a large rotunda, similar to a small pantheon in the style of ancient Rome, with a domed roof over several floors of rich internal and external decoration.

== Sources ==
- Andreas Denk, Ingeborg Flagge: Architekturführer Bonn. Dietrich Reimer Verlag, Berlin 1997, ISBN 3-496-01150-5, S. 114.
