= DATEV =

Data and software company in Germany

DATEV eG
- Type: Registered cooperative (eG)
- Industry: Business software, IT services
- Founded: February 14, 1966; 60 years ago
- Headquarters: Nuremberg, Germany
- Key people: Robert Mayr (CEO)
- Products: Accounting software, payroll software, tax software
- Services: Cloud services, data processing
- Revenue: €1.65 billion (2025)
- Members: 40,296 (2025)
- Number of employees: 9,074 (2025)
- Website: www.datev.de

DATEV eG is a German software company and IT services provider organized as an cooperative and headquartered in Nuremberg. It provides accounting, payroll, tax and business software and cloud services for tax advisors, auditors and lawyers, as well as their clients. DATEV is the market leader in Germany for tax-advisory software.

Founded in 1966 by tax practitioners in Nuremberg to process their clients' bookkeeping using electronic data processing, DATEV initially operated as a centralized data-processing service before expanding into software and cloud services.

== History ==
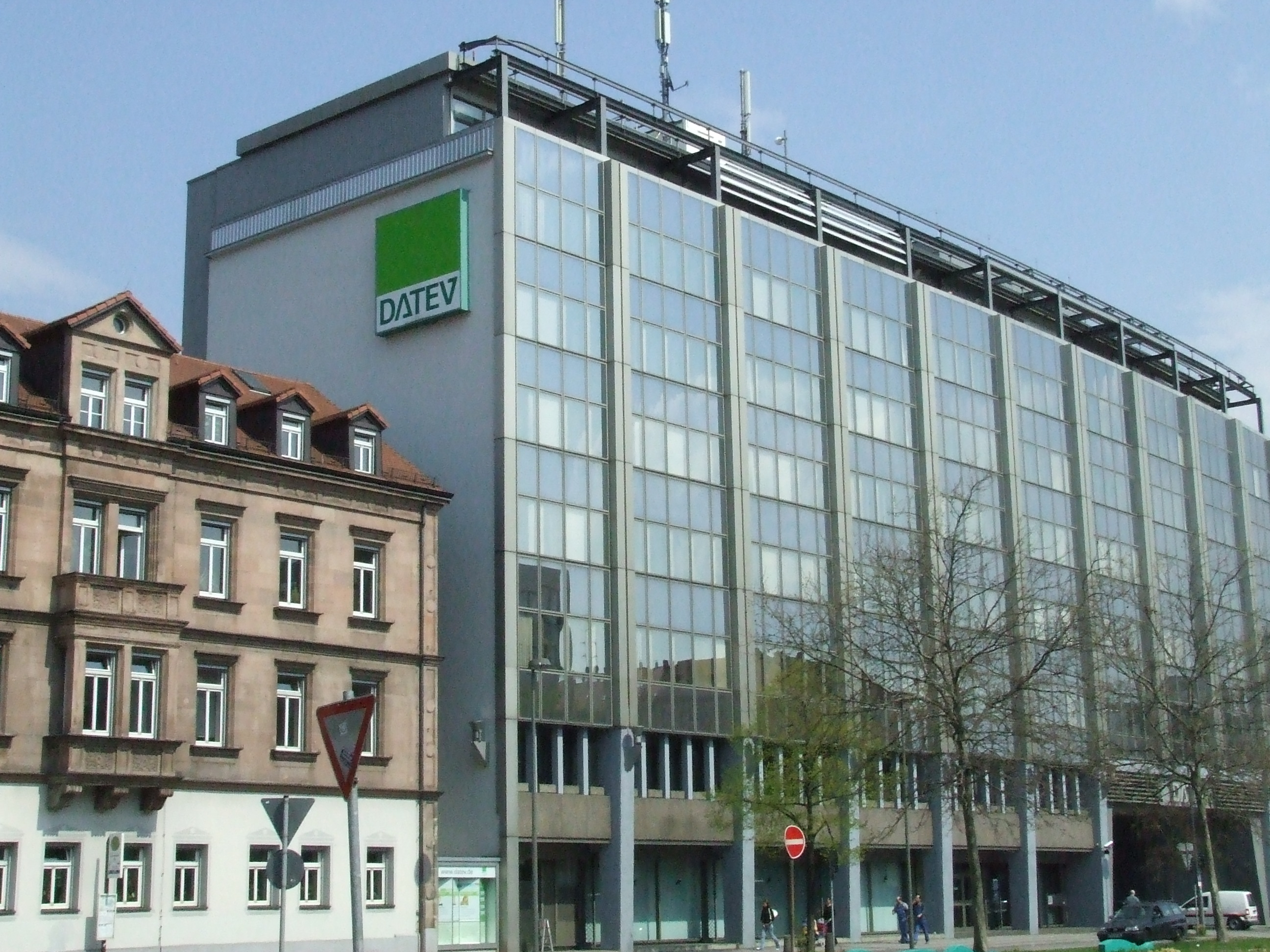
DATEV Development Area in Fürther Straße in Nuremberg

DATEV was founded on 14 February 1966, by 65 tax agents in the Nuremberg area to provide accounting services to its clients with the help of a computer. Its original name was DATEV Data Processing Organization for Tax Agents and Related Tax Services Providers within the Federal Republic of Germany, a registered co-operative society with limited liability ("Datenverarbeitung und Dienstleistung für den steuerberatenden Beruf"). The initiators were Heinz Sebiger, the 1997 honorary citizen of Nuremberg, and Joachim Mattheus.

The organisation was established to apply new applications of IT to accounting practices, because of an existing workforce shortage and the imminent introduction in 1968 of VAT. The initial DATEV services were to be completely data center based. All data was to be entered into data collection devices held "on-site" at each accountant's office which would then be sent as a tape by mail to the data center or "Registry" where they were processed and duly returned by mail to each respective accountant's office as processed tax return reports.

The initial data center services were provided by IBM until DATEV established its own center in 1969. In 1974, DATEV offered its members a data by dial up service to replace the mail delivery of data on tape to the Registry. The resulting returns and reports (e.g. payrolls, accounting reports, taxes or stocks) continued to be delivered to members via post. In 1984 work commenced on creating software to allow end client data to be processed directly "in-house" (i.e. "on-site" in each members office) in preference to being processed at the data center "Registry". The first "in-house" software applications were made available to members in 1989.

The initial "in-house" software was based on the IBM operating system known as OS/2. In 1998 the "in-house" software was made available to its members on Microsoft Windows, as it was clear that the OS/2 operating system was going to be phased out.

In 1998, DATEV also began to focus on delivering more "in-house" business software services, consulting and training based on the increased demand by members. The rapid increase in PC performance and availability of high quality (laser) printers (in duplex A4/A3) on site made the "in-house" processing of end client data both faster and more flexible than data center processing.

== Structure ==
The organisation is a registered cooperative. Membership is only open to members of the tax, accountancy and legal professions.

== Business ==
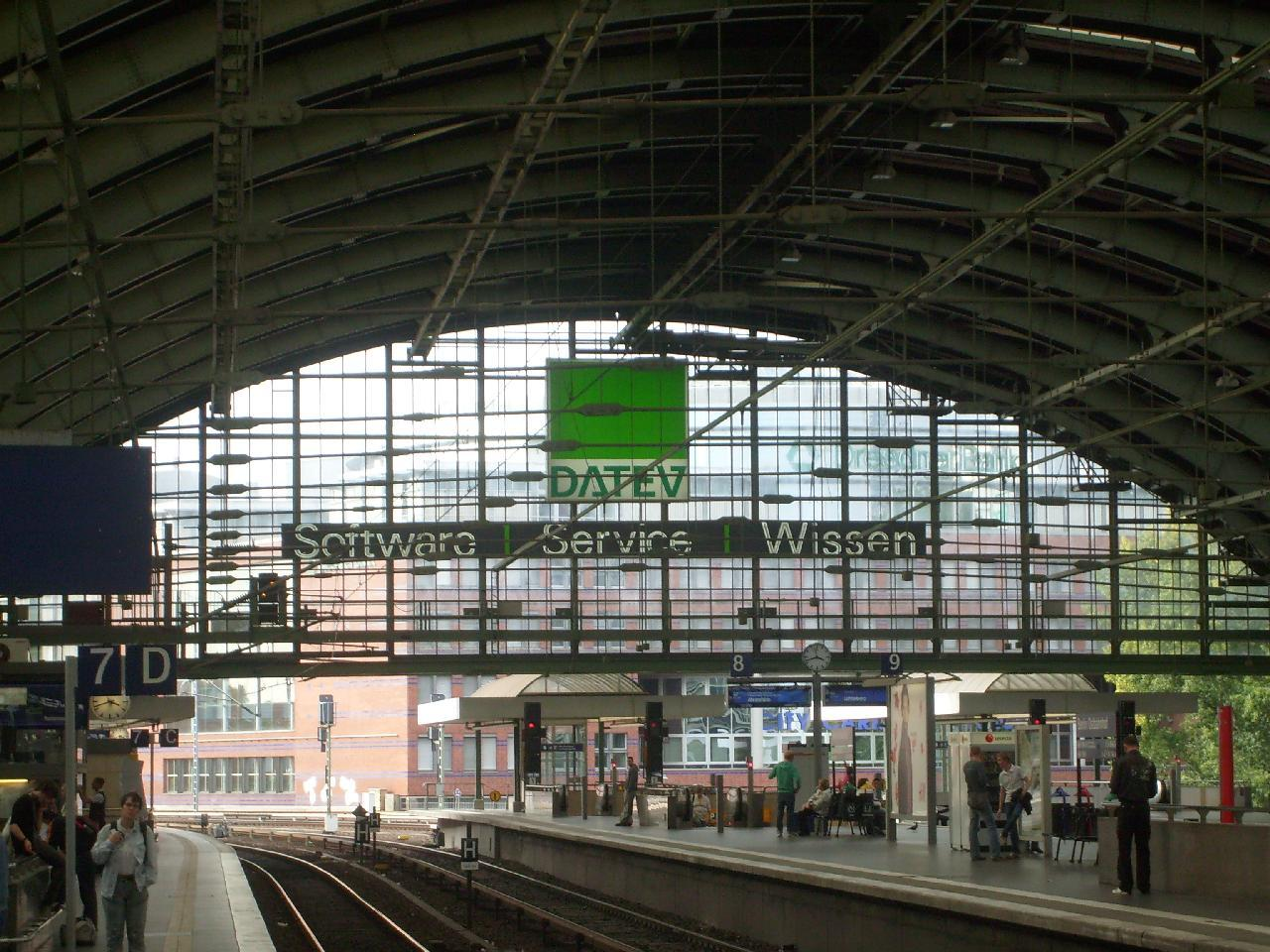
DATEV advertisement at Berlin Ostbahnhof. It translates as: "Software - Service - Knowledge"

In 1998 CEO Dieter Kempf led an initiative to add a second leg to its business by entering the legal services market. DATEV's takeover of the Hamburg-based company "MCT" brought the software "Phantasy" in its product portfolio. After a professionally and "politically" difficult start-up phase in the then crowded legal services market DATEV now offers "Software for lawyers" that are in the top five of their league including RA-MICRO, AnNoText, ReNoStar / ReNoFlex. The addition of legal services to DATEV's portfolio is still controversial given that lawyers and tax professionals are increasingly offering the same services in some areas and therefore becoming increasingly competitive to one another.

DATEV first attempts to deliver "services for lawyers" meant finding qualified legal partners with the required legal and IT backgrounds. Soon after the successful establishment of the legal services market, the DATEV product range was extended again with the offer of "audit" software for accountants.

== Strategic direction ==
In early 2000, internal disputes arose amongst the cooperative members with regard to DATEV's offer of software directly to end clients i.e. non-professionals. Two movements formed within the co-operative. Those in favor of the provision of software services directly to end clients and those opposed to it, i.e. "the co-operative should do all it can to be economically successful" vs "the co-operative should only do things that bring benefits to its members". As a result, the pro-members formed the "IDA" (Association of DATEV Users). Tension mounted between the pro-IDA and existing members who claimed that the "economic success" of the co-operative was being placed in jeopardy.

The controversy resulted in the calling of an extraordinary members meeting on 18 February 2005. In the meeting, DATEV members voted to amend the existing co-operative statute by a majority of 86.5% and the approval and support of the IDA to allow for the provision of software directly to end clients. The provision of such direct services became known as "bound member client business" and requires the prior consent of the member consultant managing that end client before the direct services can be provided to them.

Internal co-operative tensions have also arisen as a result of the extension of the provision of existing services to the international domain i.e. initially with the Czech Republic (2000), then Austria (2001), Italy (2001) and Poland in 2003.

Despite the increasing tendency to reduce the use of "data center based" services, and to increase the use of "on-site" processing software, the DATEV co-operative has continued to increase its revenues and profits. This has benefited members who have received rebates on their fees. This provision of software directly to members for "on-site" processing has been available to members as a service since 2004 and has tended to reduce membership costs, particularly for smaller network installations.

== Products ==
The company now offers additional software to accountants and lawyers for their office. These professionals and their clients can use programs for payroll and for financial accounting, current account bookkeeping, cost accounting and business consulting. There are programs for processing and interpretation of all major types of taxes (corporation tax, income tax, GuE, consumption tax, trade tax, inheritance tax, SchSt). The tax database LexInform provides comprehensive information on the German tax law tax for consultants and business information. In addition, it offers to business management consulting services for organization and data processing.

== Sponsorship ==
DATEV is a sponsor of the Challenge Roth. The contract was extended, DATEV will be the title sponsor for another 3 years from 2022.
