= Joseph Maximilian von Maillinger =

Bavarian General der Infanterie and War Minister (1820–1901)

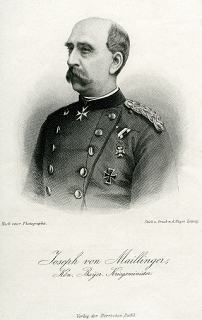
General von Maillinger (~ 1880); steel engraving by August Weger

Joseph Maximilian Fridolin Ritter von Maillinger (4 October 1820 – 6 October 1901) was a Bavarian General der Infanterie and War Minister under Ludwig II of Bavaria.

== Biography ==
Von Maillinger was born in Passau. After passing his company officer career, at last in the Generalquartiermeister staff in Munich, he was transferred to the General Command in Munich as major of the general staff. The first time, he served for the war ministry, he was ordered by Von Lüder. In 1863 he became head of department at the war ministry. Also he was adjutant of Eduard von Lutz, as well as representative of him at the Landtag. In 1865 he was advanced to Oberstleutnant, in 1866 he Oberst. Thenceforward he was commander of the 7th Royal Bavarian Infantry Regiment and deputy of Von Lutz. In 1869 he became major general and commander of the 8th Royal Bavarian Infantry Brigade. One year after that, he was advanced to lieutenant general, and led the 2nd Royal Bavarian Division during the campaigns of the Franco-Prussian War, which stood in France as part of the Bavarian occupation army until 1873. After he returned to Bavaria, he became commander of the II Royal Bavarian Corps. During the period, when he served as war minister, he was advanced to General der Infanterie in 1877 and got the main ownership of the 9th Royal Bavarian Infantry Regiment "Wrede". The psychiatrist and neurologist Prof. Dr. Dr. Dres. h.c. Heinz Häfner says, Maillinger's withdrawal from his ministry post was caused by Ludwig II's reputed sexual abuse of young cavalrists (chevau-légers). Ritter von Maillinger became a member of the Reichsrat in 1888. He died in Bad Aibling. The Maillingerstraße in Munich is named in honor of him.

== Awards ==
He received the following honours:

- Kingdom of Bavaria:
  - Knight of St. Hubert
  - Knight of the Military Order of Max Joseph, 1870
  - Knight of Merit of the Bavarian Crown
  - Knight of the Merit Order of St. Michael, 1st Class
  - Commander of the Military Merit Order
- Austrian Empire: Knight of the Iron Crown, 3rd Class
- Kingdom of Prussia:
  - Grand Cross of the Red Eagle
  - Pour le Mérite (military), 19 January 1873
  - Iron Cross, 1st Class
- Kingdom of Saxony: Grand Cross of the Albert Order

Government offices
Preceded by Siegmund Freiherr von Pranckh	Ministers of War (Bavaria); 1875–1885	Succeeded by Adolf Ritter von Heinleth
