= Hertling =

Hertling is a surname. Notable people with the surname include:

- Franz Xaver von Hertling (1780–1844), Bavarian Lieutenant General and War Minister
- Friedrich von Hertling (1781–1850), Bavarian Lieutenant General and Acting War Minister
- Franz Xaver Freiherr von Hertling (1780–1844), Bavarian lieutenant general and War Minister
- Georg von Hertling (1843–1919), Bavarian politician, Prime Minister of Bavaria and then of Prussia, and Chancellor of the German Empire
- Knud Ludvig Johannes Hertling (1925–2010), Greenlandic-Danish politician
- Mark Hertling (born 1953), United States Army general
- Nele Hertling (born 1934), German theatre manager and promoter of innovative culture
- Richard Hertling (born 1960), Acting United States Assistant Attorney General
- William Hertling (born 1970), American science fiction writer and programmer
