= III Royal Bavarian Corps =

III Royal Bavarian Army Corps III. Königlich Bayerische Armee-Korps
- Flag of the Staff of a Generalkommando (1871–1918)
- Active: 1 April 1900–1919
- Country: Bavaria / German Empire
- Type: Corps
- Size: Approximately 44,000 (on mobilisation in 1914)
- Garrison/HQ: Nuremberg/Jakob Platz 6
- Patron: King of Bavaria
- Engagements: World War I Battle of the Frontiers Battle of Caporetto

Insignia
- Abbreviation: III Bavarian AK

The III Royal Bavarian Army Corps / III Bavarian AK (German: III. Königlich Bayerisches Armee-Korps) was a corps level command of the Royal Bavarian Army, part of the Imperial German Army, before and during World War I. (Note: From the late 1800s, the Prussian Army was effectively the German Army as, during the period of German unification (1866-1871), the states of the German Empire entered into conventions with Prussia regarding their armies. Only the Bavarian Army remained fully autonomous and came under Prussian control only during wartime.)

As the German and Bavarian Armies expanded in the latter part of the 19th century, the III Royal Bavarian Army Corps of the Bavarian Army was set up on 1 April 1900 in Nuremberg as the Generalkommando (headquarters) for Middle Franconia, the Upper Palatinate and parts of Upper Franconia, Lower Bavaria and Upper Bavaria. Like all Bavarian formations, it was assigned to the IV Army Inspectorate which became the 6th Army at the start of the First World War. The Corps was disbanded at the end of the War.

== Peacetime organisation ==
The 25 peacetime Corps of the German Army (Guards, I - XXI, I - III Bavarian) had a reasonably standardised organisation. Each consisted of two divisions with usually two infantry brigades, one field artillery brigade and a cavalry brigade each. Each brigade normally consisted of two regiments of the appropriate type, so each Corps normally commanded 8 infantry, 4 field artillery and 4 cavalry regiments. There were exceptions to this rule:

V, VI, VII, IX and XIV Corps each had a 5th infantry brigade (so 10 infantry regiments)
II, XIII, XVIII and XXI Corps had a 9th infantry regiment
I, VI and XVI Corps had a 3rd cavalry brigade (so 6 cavalry regiments)
the Guards Corps had 11 infantry regiments (in 5 brigades) and 8 cavalry regiments (in 4 brigades).

Each Corps also directly controlled a number of other units. This could include one or more

Foot Artillery Regiment
Jäger Battalion
Pioneer Battalion
Train Battalion

Peacetime organization of the Corps
| Corps | Division | Brigade | Units | Garrison |
|---|---|---|---|---|
| III Royal Bavarian Corps | 5th Royal Bavarian Division | 9th Bavarian Infantry Brigade | 14th Royal Bavarian Infantry "Hartmann" | Nuremberg |
| III Royal Bavarian Corps | 5th Royal Bavarian Division | 9th Bavarian Infantry Brigade | 21st Royal Bavarian Infantry "Grand Duke Frederick Francis IV of Mecklenburg-Schwerin" | Fürth, II Bn. Sulzbach |
| III Royal Bavarian Corps | 5th Royal Bavarian Division | 10th Bavarian Infantry Brigade | 7th Royal Bavarian Infantry "Prince Leopold" | Bayreuth |
| III Royal Bavarian Corps | 5th Royal Bavarian Division | 10th Bavarian Infantry Brigade | 19th Royal Bavarian Infantry "King Viktor Emanuel III of Italy" | Erlangen |
| III Royal Bavarian Corps | 5th Royal Bavarian Division | 5th Bavarian Field Artillery Brigade | 6th Royal Bavarian Field Artillery "Prince Ferdinand of Bourlon, Duke of Calabria" | Fürth |
| III Royal Bavarian Corps | 5th Royal Bavarian Division | 5th Bavarian Field Artillery Brigade | 10th Royal Bavarian Field Artillery | Erlangen |
| III Royal Bavarian Corps | 5th Royal Bavarian Division | 5th Bavarian Cavalry Brigade | 1st Royal Bavarian Chevau-légers "Emperor Nicholas of Russia" | Nuremberg |
| III Royal Bavarian Corps | 5th Royal Bavarian Division | 5th Bavarian Cavalry Brigade | 6th Royal Bavarian Chevau-légers "Prince Albrecht of Prussia" | Bayreuth |
| III Royal Bavarian Corps | 6th Royal Bavarian Division | 11th Bavarian Infantry Brigade | 10th Royal Bavarian Infantry "King" | Ingolstadt |
| III Royal Bavarian Corps | 6th Royal Bavarian Division | 11th Bavarian Infantry Brigade | 13th Royal Bavarian Infantry "Franz Josef I, Emperor of Austria and King of Hungary" | Ingolstadt, III Bn. Eichstätt |
| III Royal Bavarian Corps | 6th Royal Bavarian Division | 12th Bavarian Infantry Brigade | 6th Royal Bavarian Infantry "Emperor William, King of Prussia" | Amberg |
| III Royal Bavarian Corps | 6th Royal Bavarian Division | 12th Bavarian Infantry Brigade | 11th Royal Bavarian Infantry "von der Tann" | Regensburg |
| III Royal Bavarian Corps | 6th Royal Bavarian Division | 6th Bavarian Field Artillery Brigade | 3rd Royal Bavarian Field Artillery "Prince Leopold" | Grafenwöhr |
| III Royal Bavarian Corps | 6th Royal Bavarian Division | 6th Bavarian Field Artillery Brigade | 8th Royal Bavarian Field Artillery "Prince Heinrich of Prussia" | Nuremberg |
| III Royal Bavarian Corps | 6th Royal Bavarian Division | 6th Bavarian Cavalry Brigade | 2nd Royal Bavarian Chevau-légers "Taxis" | Regensburg |
| III Royal Bavarian Corps | 6th Royal Bavarian Division | 6th Bavarian Cavalry Brigade | 7th Royal Bavarian Chevau-légers | Straubing |
| III Royal Bavarian Corps | Corps Troops | | 3rd Royal Bavarian Foot Artillery | Ingolstadt |
| III Royal Bavarian Corps | Corps Troops | | 4th Royal Bavarian (Fortress) Pioneer Battalion | Ingolstadt |
| III Royal Bavarian Corps | Corps Troops | | 3rd Royal Bavarian Train Abteilung | Fürth, Ingolstadt |
| III Royal Bavarian Corps | Nuremberg Defence Command (Landwehr-Inspektion) | | | Nuremberg |

== World War I ==
=== Organisation on mobilisation ===
On mobilization on 2 August 1914 the Corps was restructured. 5th Cavalry Brigade was withdrawn to form part of the Bavarian Cavalry Division and the 6th Cavalry Brigade was broken up and its regiments assigned to the divisions as reconnaissance units. Divisions received engineer companies and other support units from the Corps headquarters. In summary, III Bavarian Corps mobilised with 25 infantry battalions, 8 machine gun companies (48 machine guns), 8 cavalry squadrons, 24 field artillery batteries (144 guns), 4 heavy artillery batteries (16 guns), 3 pioneer companies and an aviation detachment.

Initial wartime organization of the Corps
| Corps | Division | Brigade | Units |
|---|---|---|---|
| III Royal Bavarian Corps | 5th Royal Bavarian Division | 9th Bavarian Infantry Brigade | 14th Bavarian Infantry Regiment |
| III Royal Bavarian Corps | 5th Royal Bavarian Division | 9th Bavarian Infantry Brigade | 21st Bavarian Infantry Regiment |
| III Royal Bavarian Corps | 5th Royal Bavarian Division | 9th Bavarian Infantry Brigade | 2nd Bavarian Reserve Jäger Battalion |
| III Royal Bavarian Corps | 5th Royal Bavarian Division | 10th Bavarian Infantry Brigade | 7th Bavarian Infantry Regiment |
| III Royal Bavarian Corps | 5th Royal Bavarian Division | 10th Bavarian Infantry Brigade | 19th Bavarian Infantry Regiment |
| III Royal Bavarian Corps | 5th Royal Bavarian Division | 5th Bavarian Field Artillery Brigade | 6th Bavarian Field Artillery Regiment |
| III Royal Bavarian Corps | 5th Royal Bavarian Division | 5th Bavarian Field Artillery Brigade | 10th Bavarian Field Artillery Regiment |
| III Royal Bavarian Corps | 5th Royal Bavarian Division | | 7th Chevauleger Regiment |
| III Royal Bavarian Corps | 5th Royal Bavarian Division | | 1st Company, 3rd Bavarian Pioneer Battalion |
| III Royal Bavarian Corps | 5th Royal Bavarian Division | | 3rd Company, 3rd Bavarian Pioneer Battalion |
| III Royal Bavarian Corps | 5th Royal Bavarian Division | | 5th Bavarian Divisional Pontoon Train |
| III Royal Bavarian Corps | 5th Royal Bavarian Division | | 1st Bavarian Medical Company |
| III Royal Bavarian Corps | 5th Royal Bavarian Division | | 3rd Bavarian Medical Company |
| III Royal Bavarian Corps | 6th Royal Bavarian Division | 11th Bavarian Infantry Brigade | 10th Bavarian Infantry Regiment |
| III Royal Bavarian Corps | 6th Royal Bavarian Division | 11th Bavarian Infantry Brigade | 13th Bavarian Infantry Regiment |
| III Royal Bavarian Corps | 6th Royal Bavarian Division | 12th Bavarian Infantry Brigade | 6th Bavarian Infantry Regiment |
| III Royal Bavarian Corps | 6th Royal Bavarian Division | 12th Bavarian Infantry Brigade | 11th Bavarian Infantry Regiment |
| III Royal Bavarian Corps | 6th Royal Bavarian Division | 6th Bavarian Field Artillery Brigade | 3rd Bavarian Field Artillery Regiment |
| III Royal Bavarian Corps | 6th Royal Bavarian Division | 6th Bavarian Field Artillery Brigade | 8th Bavarian Field Artillery Regiment |
| III Royal Bavarian Corps | 6th Royal Bavarian Division | | 2nd Chevauleger Regiment |
| III Royal Bavarian Corps | 6th Royal Bavarian Division | | 2nd Company, 3rd Bavarian Pioneer Battalion |
| III Royal Bavarian Corps | 6th Royal Bavarian Division | | 6th Bavarian Divisional Pontoon Train |
| III Royal Bavarian Corps | 6th Royal Bavarian Division | | 2nd Bavarian Medical Company |
| III Royal Bavarian Corps | Corps Troops | | I Battalion, 3rd Bavarian Foot Artillery Regiment |
| III Royal Bavarian Corps | Corps Troops | | 3rd Bavarian Aviation Detachment |
| III Royal Bavarian Corps | Corps Troops | | 3rd Bavarian Corps Pontoon Train |
| III Royal Bavarian Corps | Corps Troops | | 3rd Bavarian Telephone Detachment |
| III Royal Bavarian Corps | Corps Troops | | 3rd Bavarian Pioneer Searchlight Section |
| III Royal Bavarian Corps | Corps Troops | | Munition Trains and Columns corresponding to II Corps |

=== Combat chronicle ===
On mobilisation, III Royal Bavarian Corps was assigned to the predominantly Bavarian 6th Army forming part of the left wing of the forces for the Schlieffen Plan offensive in August 1914.

== Commanders ==
The III Royal Bavarian Corps had the following commanders during its existence:

| Dates | Rank | Name |
|---|---|---|
| 22 March 1900 | General der Infanterie | Heinrich Ritter von Xylander |
| 19 March 1904 | General der Infanterie | Karl Freiherr von Horn |
| 10 April 1905 | General der Infanterie | Luitpold Freiherr von und zu der Tann-Rathsamhausen |
| 4 May 1910 | General der Kavallerie | Otto Kreß von Kressenstein |
| 6 February 1912 | General der Kavallerie | Luitpold Freiherr von Horn |
| 19 March 1914 | General der Kavallerie | Ludwig Freiherr von Gebsattel |
| 12 January 1917 | Generalleutnant | Hermann Freiherr von Stein |
| 28 May 1918 | General der Artillerie | Hermann Freiherr von Stein |
| 19 December 1918 | | No commander |
| 19 June 1919 | | Eugen Ritter von Zoellner |

== See also ==
- German Army order of battle (1914)
- List of Imperial German infantry regiments
- List of Imperial German artillery regiments
- List of Imperial German cavalry regiments
- Grafenwoehr Training Area

== Bibliography ==
- Cron, Hermann (2002). Imperial German Army 1914-18: Organisation, Structure, Orders-of-Battle [first published: 1937]. Helion & Co. ISBN 1-874622-70-1.
- Ellis, John; Cox, Michael (1993). The World War I Databook. Aurum Press Ltd. ISBN 1-85410-766-6.
- Haythornthwaite, Philip J. (1996). The World War One Source Book. Arms and Armour. ISBN 1-85409-351-7.
- Histories of Two Hundred and Fifty-One Divisions of the German Army which Participated in the War (1914-1918), compiled from records of Intelligence section of the General Staff, American Expeditionary Forces, at General Headquarters, Chaumont, France 1919. The London Stamp Exchange Ltd. 1989 [1920]. ISBN 0-948130-87-3.
- The German Forces in the Field; 7th Revision, 11th November 1918; Compiled by the General Staff, War Office. Imperial War Museum, London and the Battery Press. 1995 [1918]. ISBN 978-1-870423-95-3.
