= Ernst Schneppenhorst =

German politician

Ernst Wilhelm Schneppenhorst (19 April 1881 – 24 April 1945) was a Bavarian politician of the Social Democratic Party of Germany (SPD).

== Biography ==
Schneppenhorst was born in Krefeld. After his professional carpenter training, he traveled as a journeyman through Germany, Austria, Hungary, Italy and Switzerland, before he settled down in Nuremberg. In 1906, he became a member of the wood workers' union, and later secretary of the union. He was a member of the Bavarian parliament from 1912 to 1920, in 1918 he became leader of the general command of the III Royal Bavarian Corps, and succeeded Richard Scheid (USPD) in 1919, who was only a few weeks minister of military affairs (war minister). In the following years he built an optical institute, and was member of the Reichstag from 1932 to 1933. In 1933 the optical institute was confiscated by the Nazis, and Schneppenhorst was primarily imprisoned in 1937. Afterwards he was member of the unionized resistance under Wilhelm Leuschner. He was detained again in 1939, and after the failed 20 July plot he was arrested in the Oranienburg concentration camp, and then transferred to the Lehrter Street Prison of Berlin.

On the night of 23-24 April 1945 Ernst Schneppenhorst, in the company of Albrecht Theodor Andreas von Bernstorff and Karl Ludwig Freiherr von und zu Guttenberg, came out and was assassinated by a commando of the Reichssicherheitshauptamt.

Ernst Schneppenhorst was honored in Memorial in remembrance of 96 members of the Reichstag murdered by the Nazis, posed in 1992 near the Reichstag building in Berlin.

== See also ==
- List of members of the 20 July plot

Government offices
Preceded by Richard Scheid	Ministers of War (Bavaria); 1919	Succeeded by Abolished
