= Carl von Horn =

Carl von Horn may refer to:

- Carl von Horn (1847–1923), Bavarian Colonel General and War Minister
- Carl von Horn (1903–1989), Swedish Army general
