= Herdling (surname) =

Herdling is a German surname. It is a variant of Hertling. The name is derived from Old High German harti, herti, Low Saxon hard, meaning 'hard, strong', and the patronymic suffix -ing.

Notable people with the surname include:

- Glenn Herdling (born 1964), American comics writer
- Kai Herdling (born 1984), German footballer
