= Oskar von Xylander =

Bavarian General der Infanterie

- Oskar von Xylander during the Great War
- Born: 16 January 1856; Mainz, Grand Duchy of Hesse
- Died: 22 May 1940 (aged 84); Munich, Nazi Germany
- Military career
- Allegiance: Kingdom of Bavaria; German Empire
- Branch: Bavarian Army; Imperial German Army
- Service years: 1874–1918
- Rank: General of the Infantry
- Commands: 1st Bavarian Infantry Regiment; 9th Bavarian Infantry Brigade; 6th Bavarian Division; I Bavarian Corps
- Conflicts: First World War
- Awards: Pour le Mérite

Oskar Ritter und Edler von Xylander (16 January 1856 – 22 May 1940) was a Bavarian General der Infanterie, at last commanding the I Royal Bavarian Corps until his retirement in 1918.

== Biography ==
Von Xylander was born in Mainz as son of Hauptmann Otto Ritter und Edler von Xylander and his wife Rosalia, née Wagenseil. He joined the Bavarian Army as an officer aspirant in the 1st Bavarian Infantry Regiment "King" on 21 September 1874 and became a Portepéefähnrich on 17 March 1875. In 1876 he was advanced to Sekondlieutenant. On 25 November 1878 he married Wilhelmine, née Jung. The couple had three sons and three daughters. After 1885 he visited the war academy in Munich, became Premierlieutenant in 1886, and was adjutant of the District Command Munich afterwards from 1889 to 1890. In 1890 he became company commander in the regiment, was promoted to Hauptmann in 1891, and after September 1893 he became officer of the general staff.

In the rank of a major he was transferred to the 3rd Division in November 1897. Afterwards he was battalion commander in the Royal Bavarian Infantry Lifeguards Regiment from the end of October 1898 until February 1899. In March 1901 he was promoted to Oberstleutnant. From August 1901 to March 1904 he was head of department in the General Staff of the Army, since May 1903 in the rank of an Oberst, afterwards commander of the 1st Infantry Regiment "King" until September 1905, before he was director of the War Academy and of the Artillery and Engineer School in Munich from 29 September 1905 to 29 December 1907. While he was director of the War Academy, he became major general in April 1906.

In the following years he was commander of the 9th Infantry Brigade from December 1907 to November 1908, Chief of the General Staff and inspector of military training institutions from November 1908 to April 1912 (promoted to lieutenant general in March 1910), and divisional commander of the 6th Bavarian Division from April 1912 to March 1913, before he got the command of the I Bavarian Corps, in the rank of General der Infanterie since March 1913.

For his merits he was multiple awarded. Two decades after his retirement, in the Third Reich, he became Grand Chancellor (Grosskanzler) of the Military Order of Max Joseph from 15 May 1933 until his death on 22 May 1940. He died in Munich.

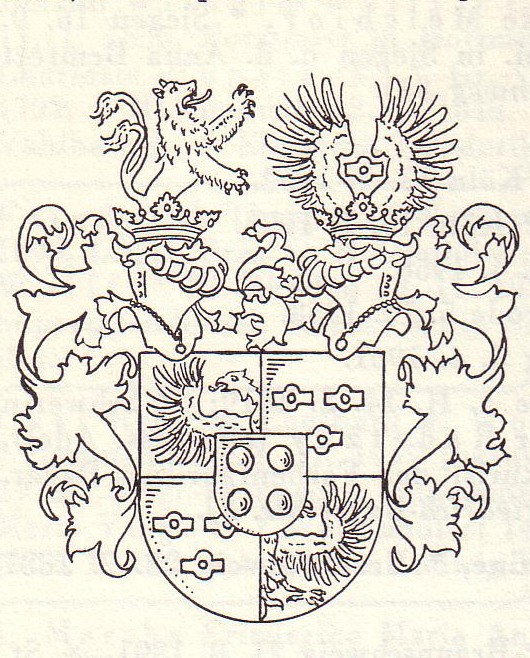
Family crest of the Edle und Ritter von Xylander, 1792

== Decorations and awards ==
- Knight's Cross of the Military Order of Max Joseph (10 August 1914)
- Pour le Mérite (20 August 1916)
- Grand Cross of the Military Merit Order with Crown and Swords (Bavaria, 19 June 1918)

== Sources ==
- Rudolf von Kramer und Otto Freiherr von Waldenfels: VIRTUTI PRO PATRIA – Der königlich bayerische Militär-Max-Joseph-Orden Kriegstaten und Ehrenbuch 1914–1918, Selbstverlag des königlich bayerischen Militär-Max-Joseph-Ordens, München 1966, S.435–436

Military offices
Preceded by missing	Quartermaster General / Chief of the General Staff (Kingdom of Bavaria); 1908–1912	Succeeded by missing
Preceded by Generaloberst Rupprecht, Crown Prince of Bavaria	Commander of I Royal Bavarian Corps; 1913–19 June 1918	Succeeded by Generalleutnant Nikolaus Ritter von Endres
