= Maximilian von Speidel =

Maximilian Freiherr von Speidel
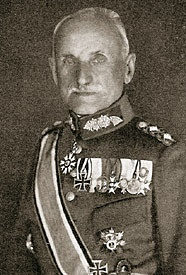
- Born: 13 September 1856; Munich, Kingdom of Bavaria, German Confederation
- Died: 24 February 1943 (aged 86); Munich, German Reich
- Relatives: ∞ 1884 Anna Gräfin von Arco auf Valley
- Military career
- Allegiance: Kingdom of Bavaria; German Empire
- Branch: Bavarian Army; Imperial German Army
- Service years: 1874–1919
- Rank: General der Kavallerie
- Conflicts: World War I
- Awards: Iron Cross; Red Eagle Order; Order of Merit of the Bavarian Crown
- Other work: Royal Bavarian Kammerjunker (1886), as of 1891 Kämmerer (Chamberlain)

Maximilian August Edmund Albert Freiherr von Speidel (13 September 1856 – 24 February 1943) was a Bavarian general and State Council at the Bavarian Ministry of War.

== Life ==
Von Speidel was born in Munich. His father, Edmund Freiherr von Speidel (1816–1887), was a lieutenant general and Marshal of the Court to Prince Luitpold of Bavaria. On 2 August 1874, he was transferred from the Pagerie to the Royal Bavarian 4th Chevau-léger Regiment "King" in Augsburg.

In 1888, acting as travel marshal, von Speidel (whom she referred to in her writings with high regard as "her cavalier") accompanied Therese Princess of Bavaria on her trip to Brazil. He would become adjutant, company, regimental, brigade and finally divisional commander. He retired on 15 December 1911 and was placed at disposal.

On 2 August 1914, he was reactivated for World War I. In the rank of a General der Kavallerie, von Speidel was commander of the 6th Bavarian Reserve Division from 30 October to 15 November 1914 (the day he was wounded), the unit in which Hitler served during World War I.

In the "Hertling Cabinet" he was acting as War Minister for a short time in 1916, before he became State Council from 26 November 1915 to 21 January 1919.

Upon agreement with Kurt Eisner and Albert Roßhaupter, on 10 November 1918 after the revolution, he and Otto von Dandl went to Schloss Wildenwart in the district of Rosenheim, where Von Speidel planned to persuade King Ludwig III to issue a declaration in which he would release the army officers of their oath, but Ludwig had already left Schloss Wildenwart. Two days later, Von Dandl could convince the king of the release of the officers of their oath.

== Family ==
=== Marriage ===
On 16 April 1884 in Munich, 2nd Lieutenant Freiherr von Speidel married his fiancée Anna Maria Karolina Maximiliane Erwine Gräfin von Arco auf Valley (1864–1922).

They would have three sons and one daughter. One son, a recipient of the Military Order of Max Joseph, fell in the First World War as a 1st lieutenant, a second, also a 1st lieutenant, died in 1920 from the long-term effects of his wounds, and a third son was a colonel in the Wehrmacht.

== Promotions ==
- 2 August 1874 Portepee-Fähnrich (Officer Cadet)
- 27 November 1876 Second-Lieutenant (2nd Lieutenant)
- 4 December 1886 Premier-Lieutenant (1st Lieutenant)
- 19 June 1891 Rittmeister
- 17 March 1897 Major
- 4 March 1901 Oberstleutnant (Lieutenant Colonel)
- 3 April 1903 Oberst (Colonel)
- 28 October 1905 Generalmajor (Major General)
  - 8 December 1907 appointed Staatsrat im ordentlichen Dienst (State Councillor) and delegated with the duties of the Minister of War who had fallen ill
- 4 December 1909 Generalleutnant (Lieutenant General)
  - likewise awarded the title "Excellence"
- 15 December 1911 Charakter als General der Kavallerie (Honorary General of the Cavalry) and placed at disposal of the army (zur Disposition gestellt)
  - 2 August 1914 reactivated
- 16 December 1914 General der Kavallerie (active General of the Cavalry with Patent)
  - 26 November 1915 again appointed Staatsrat im ordentlichen Dienst (State Councillor in active service with the Bavarian War Ministry and member of Bavarian Royal Advisory Council)

== Awards and decorations ==
- Brazilian Imperial Order of the Rose, Commander's Cross (BrR3; permission to accept on 20 May 1889)
- Spanish Order of Charles III, Knight's Cross (SpK3; permission to accept on 16 June 1889)
- Prussian Red Eagle Order, 4th Class (PrA4; permission to accept on 12 September 1891)
- Order of the Crown (Württemberg), Honorary Knight's Cross (WK3/WK3b; permission to accept on 6 July 1892)
- Military Merit Order (Bavaria), Knight 2nd Class on 27 December 1895
- Order of the Crown (Prussia), 3rd Class (PK3; permission to accept on 22 September 1897)
- Military Merit Order (Bavaria), Knight 1st Class on 25 December 1904
- Prince Regent Luitpold Jubilee Medal on 12 March 1905
- Prussian Red Eagle Order, 2nd Class (PrA2; permission to accept on 15 November 1905)
- Princely House Order of Hohenzollern, Cross of Honour I. Class (HE1/HEK1; permission to accept on 23 April 1906)
- Order of Saint Michael (Bavaria), 2nd Class on 24 October 1906
- South West Africa Commemorative Medal in Steel for non-combatants (A2; permission to accept on 19 March 1907)
- Military Merit Order (Bavaria), 2nd Class (Commander) on 26 December 1907
- Order of Merit of the Bavarian Crown, Commander on 17 October 1908
- Order of the Crown (Prussia), 2nd Class with Star (PK2m.St; permission to accept on 14 April 1909)
- Star to his Bavarian Military Merit Order 2nd Class on 17 September 1909
- Order of Saint Michael (Bavaria), 1st Class on 29 August 1910
- Friedrich Order, Grand Cross with the Crown (WF1m.Kr; permission to accept on 26 March 1914)
- Order of Henry the Lion (Duchy of Brunswick), 1st Class (BrH1; permission to accept on 13 July 1914)
- Iron Cross (1914), 2nd and 1st Class
  - 2nd Class on 22 December 1914
  - 1st Class on 12 August 1916
- Military Merit Order (Bavaria), 1st Class with Swords on 17 August 1915
- Swords to his Friedrich Order Grand Cross with the Crown (WF1m.KrX) on 22 September 1916
- Austrian Order of Franz Joseph, Grand Cross with the War Decoration (ÖFJ1K/ÖFJ1KD) on 25 October 1916
- Gallipoli Star (TH) on 21 April 1917
- Order of the Iron Crown (Austria), 1st Class with the War Decoration (ÖEK1K) on 8 September 1917
- Wound Badge (1918) in Black
- Golden Wedding Anniversary Medal 1918
- Crown Prince Rupprecht Medal in Silver or Gold on 18 May 1925
- Honour Cross of the World War 1914/1918 with Swords

Government offices
Preceded by Otto Freiherr Kreß von Kressenstein	Ministers of War (Bavaria); 1916 (acting)	Succeeded by Philipp von Hellingrath
