= Ministry of War (Kingdom of Bavaria) =

Bavarian government department (1808–1918/19)

Coordinates: 48°08′47″N 11°34′47″E

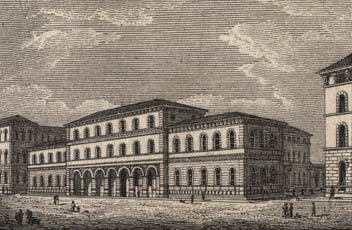
Bavarian Ministry of War in Munich, 1833

The Ministry of War (German: Kriegsministerium) was a ministry for military affairs of the Kingdom of Bavaria, founded as Ministerium des Kriegswesens on October 1, 1808 by King Maximilian I Joseph of Bavaria. It was located on the Ludwigstraße in Munich. Today the building, which was built by Leo von Klenze between 1824 and 1830, houses the Bavarian public record office, Bayerisches Hauptstaatsarchiv und Staatsarchiv München.

== History ==
The ministry was the successional institution of the royal Bavarian Hofkriegsrat (court war council, founded in 1620) and its follow-on institutions that were responsible for the military:

- Oberkriegskollegium (upper war council, after 1799)
- Kriegsjustizrat und Kriegsökonomierat (war justice council and war economic council, after 1801)
- Geheimes Kriegsbureau (privy war bureau, after 1804)

The name of the Ministerium des Kriegswesens changed to Staatsministerium der Armee in 1817, and finally to Kriegsministerium in 1825.

From 1801 to 1817, King Maximilian I Joseph of Bavaria by himself held full command of the Bavarian Army. In 1817 General von Triva was made the real head of the Ministry by him, but the administration of justice and economics of the military was part of the Oberadministrativkollegium and the Generallazarettinspektion. In 1822 Maximilian I assigned General von Wrede as commander-in-chief of the army, and the Staatsministerium der Armee also became responsible for the administration of justice and economics. After 1829 the tasks and responsibilities of the supreme command of the army (Oberkommando, existing from 1822 to 1829) were transferred to the Minister of War, so that he was additionally commander-in-chief of the army. After acquiring command of the army, the Bavarian war minister had far more extensive responsibilities compared to ministers of other countries, such as the Prussian Minister of War. After the breakdown of the Bavarian kingdom in 1918, the Kriegsministerium was replaced by the Ministerium für militärische Angelegenheiten (ministry of military affairs).

Due to the Weimar Constitution, from 1919 onwards the Bavarian Ministry of Transport and the Ministry for Military Affairs were both disbanded. The former archive of the ministry, which was founded in 1885, became a section of the Bayerisches Hauptstaatsarchiv und Staatsarchiv München. The military troops of Bavaria were subordinated to the Reichswehr, which was under the command of the Reichspräsident. Therefore, the Ministry of War was replaced by the Reichswehrbefehlsstelle Bayern (Reichswehr commanding office Bavaria) until September 1919.

== Ministers ==
Name	Term began	Term ended	Remarks
GdA Johann Nepomuk Graf von Triva (1755–1827)	March 27, 1808	September 30, 1822	until 1814: Minister-Staatssekretär im Kriegswesen (minister state secretary of warfare); 1814 to 1817: Dirigierender Minister des Kriegswesens (directing minister of warfare) thenceforward 1817: Staatsminister der Armee (state minister of the army)
GL Nikolaus Graf von Maillot de la Treille (1774–1834)	September 30, 1822	January 31, 1829	until 1826: Staatsminister der Armee thenceforward 1826: Kriegsminister (war minister)
GL Georg von Weinrich (1768–1836)	January 31, 1829	December 12, 1836	
GL Franz Xaver Frhr. von Hertling (1780–1844)	December 12, 1836	November 1, 1838	
GM Albrecht Besserer Frhr. von Thalfingen (1787–1839)	November 1, 1838	January 28, 1839	(acting)
GL Friedrich Frhr. von Hertling (1781–1850)	January 28, 1839	June 9, 1839	(acting)
GM Anton Frhr. von Gumppenberg (1787–1855)	June 9, 1839	March 1, 1847	
GM Leonhard Frhr. von Hohenhausen (1788–1872)	March 1, 1847	February 1, 1848	(acting)
GL Heinrich von der Mark (1782–1865)	February 1, 1848	April 5, 1848	(acting)
GM Karl von Weishaupt (1787–1853)	April 5, 1848	November 21, 1848	
GL Wilhelm von Le Suire (1787–1852)	November 21, 1848	May 29, 1849	
GM Ludwig von Lüder (1795–1862)	29. Mai 1849	25. März 1855	
GL Wilhelm Ritter von Manz (1804–1867)	March 25, 1855	April 13, 1859	
GM Ludwig von Lüder	April 13, 1859	June 12, 1861	2nd period
GM Moritz Ritter von Spies (1805–1862)	June 12, 1861	October 10, 1862	
GL Hugo Ritter von Bosch (1782–1865)	December 11, 1861	January 20, 1862	(acting for Ritter von Spies)
GL Bernhard von Heß (1792–1869)	January 20, 1862	June 16, 1862	(acting for Ritter von Spies)
GM Moritz von Spies	June 16, 1862	October 10, 1862(†)	
GL Bernhard von Heß	October 10, 1862	March 1, 1863	(acting after death of Ritter von Spies, 2nd time)
GM Karl Friedrich von Liel (1799–1863)	March 1, 1863	March 7, 1863(†)	
GL Hugo Ritter von Bosch	July 11, 1863	July 26, 1863	(acting, 2nd time)
GL Bernhard von Heß	July 26, 1863	August 15, 1863	(acting, 3rd time)
GM Eduard Ritter von Lutz (1810–1893)	August 15, 1863	August 1, 1866	
n/a Eduard Ritter von Rotberg (1799–1884)	1866	1866	(acting)
GM Siegmund Freiherr von Pranckh (1821–1888)	August 1, 1866	April 4, 1875	
GdI Joseph Maximilian Ritter von Maillinger (1820–1901)	April 4, 1875	May 1, 1885	
GdI Adolf Ritter von Heinleth (1823–1895)	May 1, 1885	May 6, 1890	
GdI Benignus Ritter von Safferling (1825–1895)	May 6, 1890	June 5, 1893	
GL Adolph Freiherr von Asch zu Asch auf Oberndorff (1839–1906)	June 5, 1893	April 4, 1905	
GO Carl Graf von Horn (1847–1923)	April 4, 1905	February 16, 1912	
GO Otto Freiherr Kreß von Kressenstein (1850–1929)	February 16, 1912	December 7, 1916	
GL Maximilian Freiherr von Speidel (1856–1943)	1916	1916	(acting)
General der Kavallerie Philipp von Hellingrath (1862–1939)	December 11, 1916	November 8, 1918	
Minister für militärische Angelegenheiten (ministers of military affairs) of Bavaria after the German revolution
Albert Roßhaupter (1878–1949)	November 8, 1918	February 21, 1919	politician of the MSPD
Richard Scheid (1876–1962)	March 1, 1919	March 17, 1919	politician of the USPD
Ernst Schneppenhorst (1881–1945)	March 18, 1919	August 22, 1919	politician of the MSPD
