= Benignus von Safferling =

Bavarian general and war minister (1825–1895)

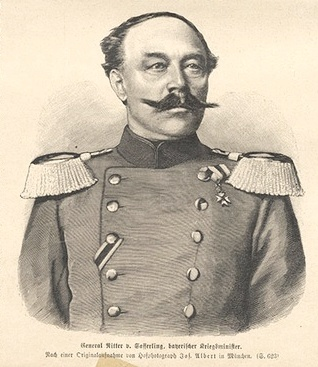
Benignus von Safferling.

Benignus Ritter von Safferling (30 November 1825 – 4 September 1899) was a Bavarian General der Infanterie and War Minister under Otto of Bavaria.

== Biography ==
Von Safferling was born in Freising. When he was eight years old, he went with his father, a soldier of King Otto to Greece. In 1835, his father was killed in action in Argos, when he was commander of an uhlan regiment. Von Safferling joined the cadets corps at Aegina shortly afterwards. In the rank of a Korporal he was transferred to the 2nd Infantry Regiment in Greece. In 1843, when the Bavarians had to leave the country, he was acquired by the Bavarian army, where he was advanced to Unterleutnant in 1845, in 1849 to Oberleutnant and in 1859 to Hauptmann. He took part in the Austro-Prussian War 1866, and served as a Major in the general staff in the 1st Royal Bavarian Division under General Stephan during the Franco-Prussian War. After the war he stood in France as Bavarian military representative at the Oberkommando of the occupation army until 1872. Back in Bavaria, he became commander of the training troops, which had to teach Prussian parade rules in the Bavarian forces. In 1874, he became Oberstleutnant and commander of the Infantry Regiment "King", two years later he became Oberst. In the rank of Major General he was transferred to Metz, where he served as commander of the Bavarian occupation brigade. In 1886, he became Lieutenant General and president of the General Auditorium, in the following year he became adjutant general and commander of the 2nd Royal Bavarian Division. On 5 May 1890 he took office as war minister. In the same year he was advanced to the rank General der Infanterie on 20 September, and was awarded honorary citizen of Regensburg. Ritter von Safferling was retired at his own request on 5 June 1893. He died in Partenkirchen, and is buried at the Alter Nördlicher Friedhof in Munich.

== Awards ==
- Military Order of Max Joseph

Government offices
Preceded by Adolf Ritter von Heinleth	Ministers of War (Bavaria); 1890 – 1893	Succeeded by Adolph Freiherr von Asch zu Asch auf Oberndorff
