= Hellingrath =

Hellingrath may refer to:

- Norbert von Hellingrath (1888–1916), German literary scholar
- Philipp von Hellingrath (1862–1939), Bavarian general and War Minister
