= Karl Friedrich von Liel =

Karl Friedrich von Liel (10 May 1799 – 7 March 1863) was a Bavarian Major General and War Minister under Maximilian II of Bavaria from 1 March 1863 until his death.

Von Liel was born in Koblenz. In 1839 he was advanced to the rank of a Hauptmann, and invented a fortress gun carriage, which was named after him. In 1844 he became Major, and in 1848 Oberstleutnant. He took part in the federal execution in Baden and was head of the army organization department of the Frankfurt Parliament. Between his deployments as military representative of Bavaria at the German Confederation from 1850 to 1851 and from 1854 to 1863, he was advanced to Oberst in 1852. Shortly after he became war minister, he died in Badenweiler.

== References and notes ==
Government offices
Preceded by Bernhard von Heß (acting)	Ministers of War (Bavaria); 1863	Succeeded by Hugo Ritter von Bosch (acting)
