= Hugo von Bosch =

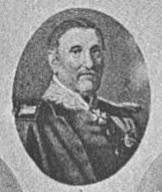
Hugo von Bosch

Hugo von Bosch (2 January 1782 – 7 August 1865) was a Bavarian lieutenant general and twice served as Acting War Minister for under Maximilian II of Bavaria.

== Biography ==
Bosch was born in Schillingsfürst. He served as an officer in the County of Hohenlohe-Schillingsfürst after 1795, before he was commissioned into the Bavarian Army in the rank of Oberleutnant He was promoted to Hauptmann in 1810, Major in 1824, Oberstleutnant in 1834 and Oberst in 1839, before he was advanced to Major General and Brigadier in 1844. In the years from 1849 to 1851 he was commander of the Fortress of the German Confederation at Ulm, the so-called Bundesfestung. In 1852 he was promoted Lieutenant General and in 1861 was appointed as president of the General Auditorium. He was acting as war minister from 11 December 1861 to 20 January 1862 and for a second time from 11 to 26 July 1863. He died in Munich

== References and notes ==
Government offices
Preceded by Moritz Ritter von Spies	Ministers of War (Bavaria); 1861 – 1862 (acting)	Succeeded by Bernhard von Heß
Preceded by Karl Friedrich von Liel	Ministers of War (Bavaria); 1863 (acting)	Succeeded by Bernhard von Heß (acting)
