= Besserer von Thalfingen =

Swabian Noble Family

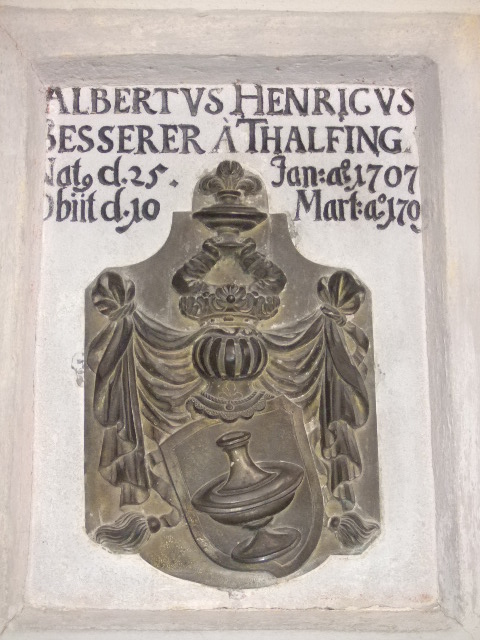
Tomb of a member of the Besserer von Thalfingen line in the St.-Lambertus-Kirche in Bernstadt

Besserer von Thalfingen is the name of an old Swabian family. The members of the line were originally located in Bavaria and Württemberg.

The family line has been known since the 13th century and was ennobled to Freiherren in 1817 and 1838. It seems, that the Besserer von Thalfingens had the same roots as the sirs Von Besser, which had its seeds also in the surroundings of Ulm. One line of the Von Bessers owned the estate of Thalfingen, which is a part of Elchingen since May 1, 1978, and the descendants of another line were later located in Saxony. The writing of the name of the members of the Thalfingen line changed from Besser to Besserer.

== Notable members ==
- Albrecht Freiherr Besserer von Thalfingen (1787–1839), Bavarian General, court marshal and acting war minister
- Johann Jakob Besserer von Thalfingen (1753–1834), mayor of Augsburg
