= Eduard Anton von Rotberg =

Bavarian military general (1799–1884)

Eduard Anselm Freiherr von Rotberg (1799 – 1884) was a Bavarian general. He was acting as War Minister of the kingdom for a short time in 1866.

Government offices
Preceded by Eduard Ritter von Lutz	Ministers of War (Bavaria); 1866 (acting)	Succeeded by Siegmund Freiherr von Pranckh
