= 5th Royal Bavarian Division =

5th Royal Bavarian Division (5. Königlich Bayerische Division); from August 2, 1914, 5th Bavarian Infantry Division (5. Bayerische Infanterie-Division)
- Active: 1890–1919
- Country: Bavaria, German Empire
- Branch: Army
- Type: Infantry (in peacetime included cavalry)
- Size: Approximately 18,000 (on mobilisation in 1914)
- Part of: III Royal Bavarian Corps (III. Kgl. Bayer. Armeekorps)
- Garrison/HQ: Landau (1890-1901); Nuremberg (1901-1919)
- Engagements: World War I: Battle of the Frontiers, Second Battle of Champagne, Battle of Arras (1917), Passchendaele, German spring offensive, Battle of the Somme (1916), Battle of Delville Wood, Second Battle of the Somme (1918)

The 5th Royal Bavarian Division was a unit of the Royal Bavarian Army which served alongside the Prussian Army as part of the Imperial German Army. The division was formed on October 1, 1890, in Landau as the 5th Division and swapped division numbers with the Nuremberg-based 3rd Royal Bavarian Division in 1901. In Bavarian sources, it was not generally referred to as a "Royal Bavarian" division, as this was considered self-evident, but outside Bavaria, this designation was used for it, and other Bavarian units, to distinguish them from similarly numbered Prussian units. The division was part of the III Royal Bavarian Army Corps.

== Combat chronicle ==
During World War I, the division served on the Western Front. It fought initially in the Battle of the Frontiers. It then served in the area between the Meuse and Moselle Rivers until October 1915, seeing action on the Meuse heights by St. Mihiel and in the Bois-brulé, and then fought in the Second Battle of Champagne. After a brief period in reserve, the division went in the trenchlines in the Meuse-Moselle region until September 1916, and then fought briefly in the Battle of the Somme, where it suffered heavy losses. From October 1916 into 1918, the division occupied the trenchlines in Flanders and the Artois, and fought in the Battle of Arras and the Battle of Passchendaele. After a month in reserve, it went into the 1918 German spring offensive, fighting in the First Battle of the Somme (1918), also known as the Second Battle of the Somme (to distinguish it from the 1916 battle). It then remained on the defensive in the region until the end of the war, including fighting in the Second Battle of the Somme (1918), also known as the Third Battle of the Somme. Allied intelligence rated the division as first class, although not one of the best Bavarian divisions.

== Pre–World War I peacetime organization ==
In 1914, the peacetime organization of the 5th Royal Bavarian Division was as follows:

- 9. bayerische Infanterie-Brigade
  - Kgl. Bayerisches 14. Infanterie-Regiment Hartmann
  - Kgl. Bayerisches 21. Infanterie-Regiment Großherzog Friedrich Franz IV. von Mecklenburg-Schwerin
- 10. bayerische Infanterie-Brigade
  - Kgl. Bayerisches 7. Infanterie-Regiment Prinz Leopold
  - Kgl. Bayerisches 19. Infanterie-Regiment König Viktor Emanuel III. von Italien
- 5. bayerische Kavallerie-Brigade
  - Kgl. Bayerisches 1. Chevaulegers-Regiment Kaiser Nikolaus von Rußland
  - Kgl. Bayerisches 6. Chevaulegers-Regiment Prinz Albrecht von Preußen
- 5. bayerische Feldartillerie-Brigade
  - Kgl. Bayerisches 6. Feldartillerie-Regiment Prinz Ferdinand von Bourbon, Herzog von Calabrien
  - Kgl. Bayerisches 10. Feldartillerie-Regiment
- Landwehr-Inspektion Nürnberg

== Order of battle on mobilization ==
On mobilization, in August 1914, at the beginning of World War I, most divisional cavalry, including brigade headquarters, was withdrawn to form cavalry divisions or split up among divisions as reconnaissance units. Divisions received engineer companies and other support units from their higher headquarters. The 5th Bavarian Division was renamed the 5th Bavarian Infantry Division. The division's initial wartime organization (major units) was as follows:

- 9. bayerische Infanterie-Brigade
  - Kgl. Bayerisches 14. Infanterie-Regiment Hartmann
  - Kgl. Bayerisches 21. Infanterie-Regiment Großherzog Friedrich Franz IV. von Mecklenburg-Schwerin
  - Kgl. Bayerisches Reserve-Jäger-Bataillon Nr. 2
- 10. bayerische Infanterie-Brigade
  - Kgl. Bayerisches 7. Infanterie-Regiment Prinz Leopold
  - Kgl. Bayerisches 19. Infanterie-Regiment König Viktor Emanuel III. von Italien
- Kgl. Bayerisches 7. Chevaulegers-Regiment Prinz Alfons
- 5. bayerische Feldartillerie-Brigade
  - Kgl. Bayerisches 6. Feldartillerie-Regiment Prinz Ferdinand von Bourbon, Herzog von Calabrien
  - Kgl. Bayerisches 10. Feldartillerie-Regiment
- 1.Kompanie/Kgl. Bayerisches 3. Pionier-Bataillon
- 3.Kompanie/Kgl. Bayerisches 3. Pionier-Bataillon

== Late World War I organization ==
Divisions underwent many changes during the war, with regiments moving from division to division, and some being destroyed and rebuilt. During the war, most divisions became triangular - one infantry brigade with three infantry regiments rather than two infantry brigades of two regiments (a "square division"). The 5th Bavarian Infantry Division was triangularized in January 1917, sending the 9th Bavarian Infantry Brigade headquarters and the 14th Bavarian Infantry Regiment to the newly formed 16th Bavarian Infantry Division. An artillery commander replaced the artillery brigade headquarters, the cavalry was further reduced, and the engineer contingent was increased. Divisional signals commanders were established to better control communications, a major problem in coordinating infantry and artillery operations during World War I. The division's order of battle on March 20, 1918, was as follows:

- 10. bayerische Infanterie-Brigade
  - Kgl. Bayerisches 7. Infanterie-Regiment Prinz Leopold
  - Kgl. Bayerisches 19. Infanterie-Regiment König Viktor Emanuel III. von Italien
  - Kgl. Bayerisches 21. Infanterie-Regiment Großherzog Friedrich Franz IV. von Mecklenburg-Schwerin
  - Kgl. Bayerische Maschinengewehr-Scharfschützen-Abteilung Nr. 1
- 4.Eskadron/Kgl. Bayerisches 2. Chevaulegers-Regiment Taxis
- Kgl. Bayerischer Artillerie-Kommandeur 5
  - Kgl. Bayerisches 10. Feldartillerie-Regiment
  - III.Bataillon/Kgl. Bayerisches 1. Fußartillerie-Regiment vakant Bothmer
- Kgl. Bayerisches 3. Pionier-Bataillon
  - Kgl. Bayerische Pionier-Kompanie Nr. 10
  - Kgl. Bayerische Pionier-Kompanie Nr. 13
  - Kgl. Bayerische Minenwerfer-Kompanie Nr. 5
- Kgl. Bayerischer Divisions-Nachrichten-Kommandeur 5
