= Karl von Lobenhoffer =

Bavarian military general (1843–1901)

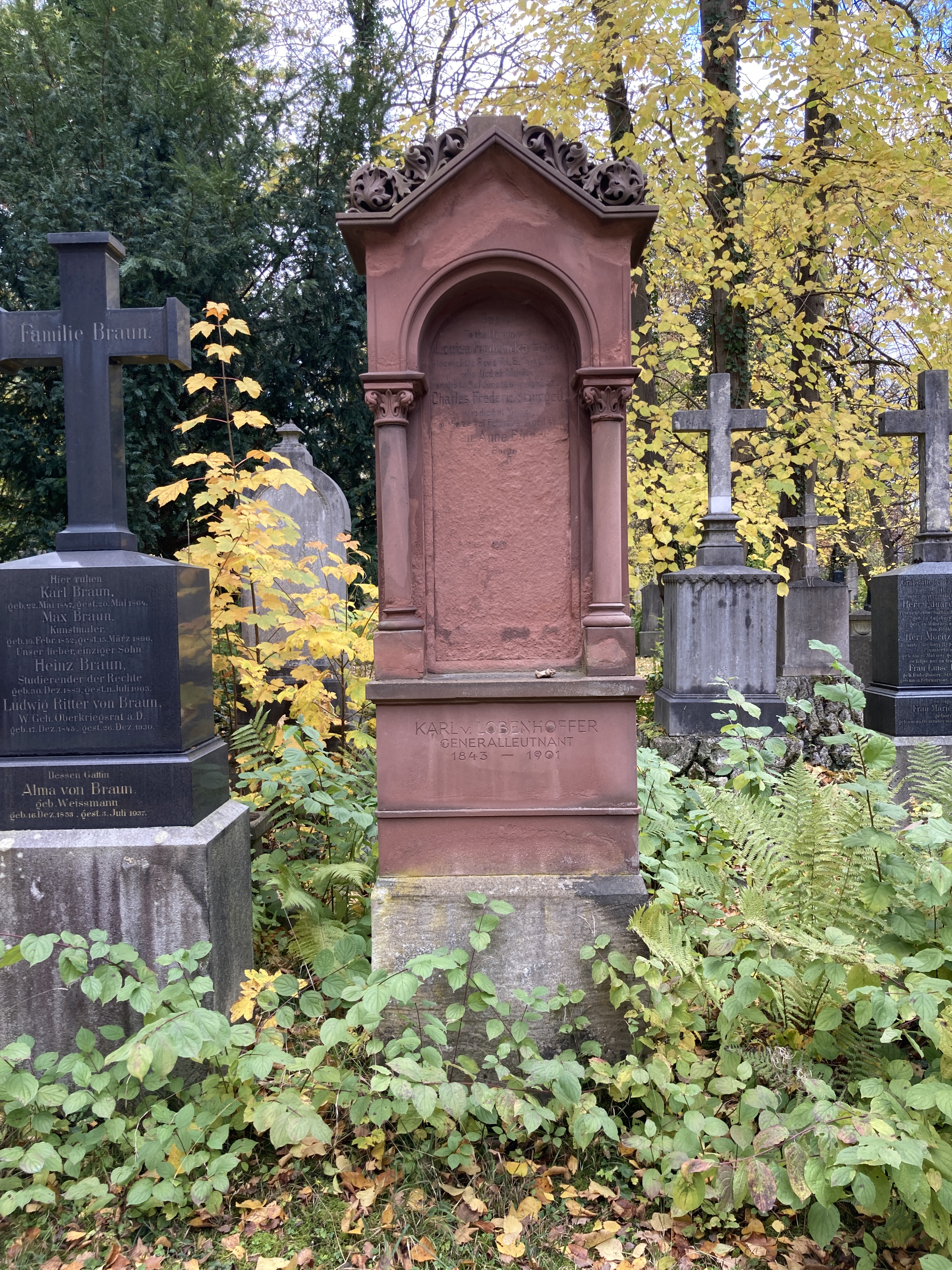
Grave of Lobenhoffer

Karl Ritter von Lobenhoffer (born 1843 – died 1901) was a Bavarian Lieutenant General and Chief of the General Staff of the Bavarian army from 1896 to 1901.

Von Lobenhoffer was son of Wilhelm Lobenhoffer (died 1862), a royal Bavarian judge. He is buried on the Old Southern Cemetery in Munich.

== References and notes ==
Military offices
| Preceded by missing | Quartermaster General / Chief of the General Staff (Kingdom of Bavaria); 1896–1901 | Succeeded by missing |
