= Wilhelm von Manz =

Wilhelm Ritter von Manz (6 April 1804 – 5 January 1867) was a Bavarian Lieutenant General and War Minister under Maximilian II of Bavaria from 13 April 1859 to 12 June 1861.

Von Manz was born in Dillingen. After holding several officer positions in the Bavarian army, he became war minister in 1855. Afterwards, he served as commander in chief of the Munich garrison, where he died in 1867. On 15 June 1846, he married Adelheid von Zedtwitz.

Government offices
Preceded by Ludwig von Lüder	Ministers of War (Bavaria); 1855–1859	Succeeded by Ludwig von Lüder
