= Heinrich von der Mark =

Heinrich von der Mark (14 December 1782 – 14 June 1865) was a Bavarian Lieutenant General and Acting War Minister from 1 February to 5 April 1848.

== Biography ==
Mark was born in Aldenhoven and died in Bamberg. He took part in the campaigns of the Bavarian army in the years from 1800 to 1815, was advanced to a Major in 1815, to an Oberstleutnant in 1825 and to an Oberstin 1832. In 1841 he was promoted Major General and Brigadier, and a few months later Lieutenant General, also in 1841. During the Lola Montez affair, Mark refused to deploy his troops to defend her against the Munich students and citizens on 11 February 1848. After the withdrawal of Ludwig I of Bavaria, Mark was war minister of the Kingdom of Bavaria under King Maximilian II.

== See also ==
- House of La Marck
- County of Mark

== References and notes ==
Government offices
Preceded by Leonhard Freiherr von Hohenhausen (acting)	Ministers of War (Bavaria); 1848 (acting)	Succeeded by Karl von Weishaupt
