= 1st Royal Bavarian Division =

1st Royal Bavarian Division 1st Bavarian Infantry Division
- 1. Königlich Bayerische Division; 1. Bayerische Infanterie-Division
- Active: 1815–1919
- Country: Kingdom of Bavaria; German Empire
- Branch: Bavarian Army; Imperial German Army
- Type: Infantry (in peacetime included cavalry)
- Size: Division; Approximately 19,500 (on mobilisation in 1914)
- Part of: I Royal Bavarian Corps (I. Kgl. Bayer. Armeekorps)
- Garrison/HQ: Munich
- Engagements: Austro-Prussian War; Franco-Prussian War: Battle of Wörth; Battle of Beaumont; Battle of Sedan; First Battle of Orléans; Second Battle of Orléans; Battle of Loigny-Poupry; Siege of Paris; World War I: Battle of the Frontiers; Race to the Sea; Battle of Verdun; Battle of the Somme; German spring offensive

Commanders
- Notable commanders: Luitpold, Prince Regent of Bavaria; Ludwig Freiherr von und zu der Tann-Rathsamhausen; Prince Leopold of Bavaria; Rupprecht, Crown Prince of Bavaria; Otto Freiherr Kress von Kressenstein

The 1st Royal Bavarian Division was a unit of the Royal Bavarian Army that served alongside the Prussian Army as part of the Imperial German Army. The division was formed on November 27, 1815, as the Infantry Division of the Munich General Command (Infanterie-Division des Generalkommandos München.). It was called the 1st Army Division between 1822 and 1848, again between 1851 and 1859, and again from 1869 to 1872. It was called the 1st Infantry Division from 1848 to 1851 (as well as during wartime) and was named the Munich General Command from 1859 to 1869. From April 1, 1872, until mobilization for World War I, it was the 1st Division. Within Bavaria, it was not generally referred to as a "Royal Bavarian" division, but outside Bavaria, this designation was used for it, and other Bavarian units, to distinguish them from similarly numbered Prussian units. The division was headquartered in Munich from 1815 to 1919. The division was part of the 1st Royal Bavarian Army Corps.

The division fought against Prussia in the Austro-Prussian War of 1866. In the Franco-Prussian War of 1870-71, the division fought alongside the Prussians. It saw action in battles of Wörth, Beaumont, and Sedan, the 1st and 2nd battles of Orleans, the battle of Loigny-Poupry, and the siege of Paris.

During World War I, the division served on the Western Front. It fought in the Battle of the Frontiers against French forces in the early stages, and then participated in the Race to the Sea. Thereafter, it remained on the northern part of the front facing the British Army through 1915 and early 1916. The Infantry Life Regiment was transferred from the division in 1915 to become part of a provisional German mountain division, the Alpenkorps, sent to the Italian Front. In 1916, the division went into the Battle of Verdun. After Verdun, it went to the Somme in that battle's later stages. 1917 was spent mainly occupying the trench lines. In 1918, the division participated in the German spring offensive. The division was generally rated one of the better German divisions by Allied intelligence.

== Pre-World War I peacetime organization ==
In 1914, the peacetime organization of the 1st Royal Bavarian Division was as follows:

- 1st Royal Bavarian Infantry Brigade (1. Königlich Bayerische Infanterie-Brigade)
  - Royal Bavarian Infantry Lifeguards Regiment (Kgl. Bayer. Infanterie-Leib-Regiment)
  - Royal Bavarian 1st Infantry Regiment "King" (Kgl. Bayer. 1. Infanterie-Regiment König)
- 2nd Royal Bavarian Infantry Brigade (2. Kgl. Bayer. Infanterie-Brigade)
  - Royal Bavarian 2nd Infantry Regiment "Crown Prince" (Kgl. Bayer. 2. Infanterie-Regiment Kronprinz)
  - Royal Bavarian 16th Infantry Regiment "Grand Duke Ferdinand of Tuscany" (Kgl. Bayer. 16. Infanterie-Regiment Großherzog Ferdinand von Toskana)
- 1st Royal Bavarian Cavalry Brigade (1. Kgl. Bayer. Kavallerie-Brigade)
  - 1st Royal Bavarian Heavy Cavalry “Prince Charles of Bavaria” (Kgl. Bayer. 1. Schweres Reiter-Regiment Prinz Karl von Bayern)
  - 2nd Royal Bavarian Heavy Cavalry "Archduke Francis Ferdinand of Austria" (Kgl. Bayer. 2. Schweres Reiter-Regiment Erzherzog Franz-Ferdinand von Österreich-Este)
- 1st Royal Bavarian Field Artillery Brigade (1. Kgl. Bayer. Feldartillerie-Brigade)
  - Royal Bavarian 1st Field Artillery Regiment "Prince Regent Luitpold" (Kgl. Bayer. 1. Feldartillerie-Regiment Prinz-Regent Luitpold)
  - Royal Bavarian 7th Field Artillery Regiment "Prince Regent Luitpold" (Kgl. Bayer. 7. Feldartillerie-Regiment Prinz-Regent Luitpold)

== Order of battle on mobilization ==
On mobilization, in August 1914, at the beginning of World War I, most divisional cavalry, including brigade headquarters, was withdrawn to form cavalry divisions or split up among divisions as reconnaissance units. Divisions received engineer companies and other support units from their higher headquarters. The 1st Division was renamed the 1st Bavarian Infantry Division. Its initial wartime organization (major units) was as follows:

- 1. Kgl. Bayer. Infanterie-Brigade
  - Kgl. Bayer. Infanterie-Leib-Regiment
  - Kgl. Bayer. 1. Infanterie-Regiment König
- 2. Kgl. Bayer. Infanterie-Brigade
  - Kgl. Bayer. 2. Infanterie-Regiment Kronprinz
  - Kgl. Bayer. 16. Infanterie-Regiment Großherzog Ferdinand von Toskana
  - Kgl. Bayer. 1. Jäger-Bataillon König
- Kgl. Bayer. 8. Chevaulegers-Regiment
- 1. Kgl. Bayer. Feldartillerie-Brigade
  - Kgl. Bayer. 1. Feldartillerie-Regiment Prinz-Regent Luitpold
  - Kgl. Bayer. 7. Feldartillerie-Regiment Prinz-Regent Luitpold
  - Kgl. Bayer. 10. Fußartillerie-Bataillon
- 1.Kompanie/Kgl. Bayer. 1. Pionier-Bataillon
- 3.Kompanie/Kgl. Bayer. 1. Pionier-Bataillon

== Late World War I organization ==
Divisions underwent many changes during the war, with regiments moving from division to division, and some being destroyed and rebuilt. During the war, most divisions became triangular - one infantry brigade with three infantry regiments rather than two infantry brigades of two regiments (a "square division"). An artillery commander replaced the artillery brigade headquarters, the cavalry was further reduced, and the engineer contingent was increased. Divisional signals commanders were established to better control communications, a major problem in coordinating infantry and artillery operations during the war. The division's order of battle on March 21, 1918, was as follows:

- 1. Kgl. Bayer. Infanterie-Brigade
  - Kgl. Bayer. 1. Infanterie-Regiment König
  - Kgl. Bayer. 2. Infanterie-Regiment Kronprinz
  - Kgl. Bayer. 24. Infanterie-Regiment
  - Kgl. Bayer. 4. MG-Scharfschützen-Abteilung
- 2.Eskadron/Kgl. Bayer. 8. Chevaulegers-Regiment
- Kgl. Bayer. Artillerie-Kommandeur 1
  - Kgl. Bayer. 1. Feldartillerie-Regiment Prinz-Regent Luitpold
  - Kgl. Bayer. 9. Fußartillerie-Bataillon
- Stab Kgl. Bayer. 1. Pionier-Bataillon
  - Kgl. Bayer. 1. Pionier-Kompanie
  - Kgl. Bayer. 3. Pionier-Kompanie
  - Kgl. Bayer. 3. Minenwerfer-Kompanie
- Kgl. Bayer. 1. Divisions-Nachrichten-Kommandeur

=== History ===
At the beginning of the First World War, the division was mobilized under the command of the 6th Army, on the Western Front.

== Notable commanders ==
- Luitpold, Prince Regent of Bavaria (1856–1861)
- Ludwig Freiherr von und zu der Tann-Rathsamhausen (1861–1869) - A senior Bavarian field commander in the Franco-Prussian War
- Prince Leopold of Bavaria (1881–1887) - Later a Generalfeldmarschall
- Rupprecht, Crown Prince of Bavaria (1904–1906) - Later a Generalfeldmarschall
- Otto Freiherr Kress von Kressenstein (1906–1910) - Bavarian Minister of War, 1912–1916
