= Bernhard von Heß =

German general (1792–1869)

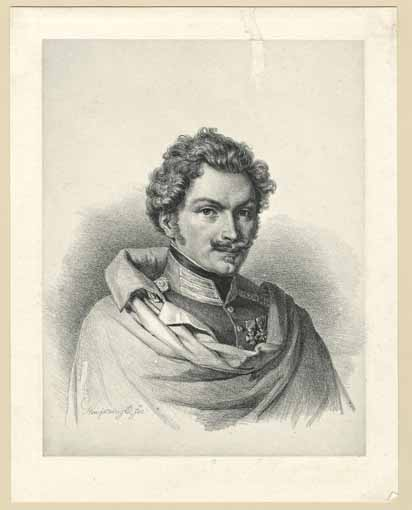
Bernhard von Heß

Bernhard Franz von Hess (22 May 1792 – 20 April 1869) was a Bavarian lieutenant general and War Minister under Maximilian II of Bavaria.

== Biography ==
Von Hess was born in Hammelburg as the youngest of three sons of the landholder and Hofrat Philipp von Hess and his wife Gertraud, née Wankel. He visited the Gymnasium in his hometown, and finished his studies of mathematics and sciences at the University of Würzburg, before he joined the Landwehr of Fulda in 1813, and took part in the campaigns under Prince Schwarzenberg in France. From 1833 to 1843 he served in Greece under the governing prince regent Otto, and joined the Bavarian army. Von Hess was war minister from 20 January to 16 June 1862. He was acting for a second period from 10 October 1862 to 1 March 1863 and for a third time from 26 July to 15 August 1863. In 1867 he was retired, and died in Kissingen.

== Notes and references ==
Government offices
Preceded by Hugo Ritter von Bosch (acting)	Ministers of War (Bavaria); 1862	Succeeded by Moritz Ritter von Spies
Preceded by Moritz Ritter von Spies	Ministers of War (Bavaria); 1862–1863 (acting)	Succeeded by Karl Friedrich von Liel (acting)
Preceded by Hugo Ritter von Bosch (acting)	Ministers of War (Bavaria); 1863 (acting)	Succeeded by Eduard Ritter von Lutz
