= Adolf von Heinleth =

Bavarian military officer (1823–1895)

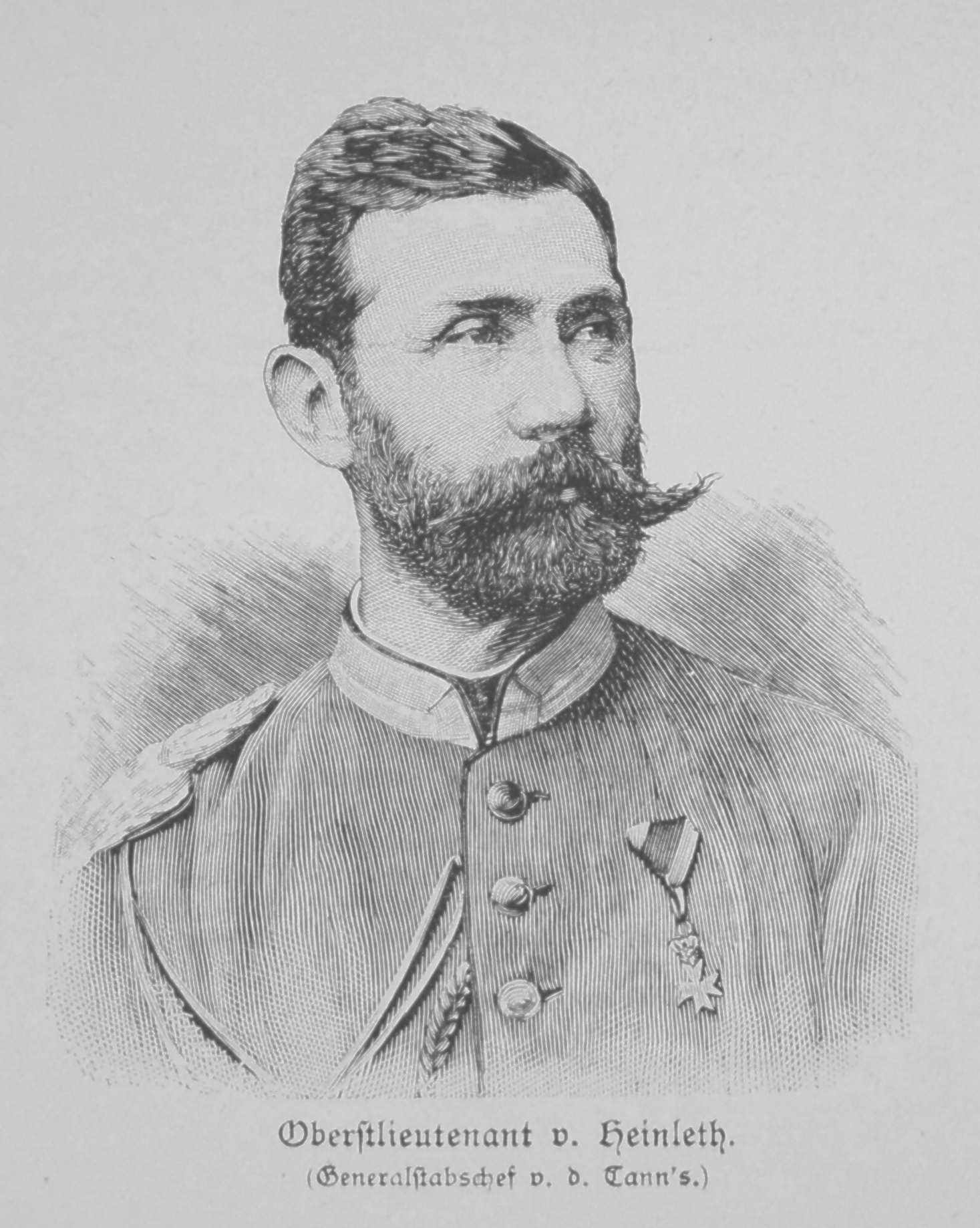
- Von Heinleth in the rank of Oberstleutnant
- Born: 24 October 1823; Munich, Germany
- Died: 26 February 1895 (aged 71); Munich, Germany
- Military career
- Allegiance: Bavarian
- Rank: General der Infanterie
- Conflicts: Franco-Prussian War
- Awards: Military Order of Max Joseph

Adolf (or Adolph) Ritter von Heinleth (24 October 1823 – 26 February 1895) was a Bavarian General der Infanterie and War Minister under Ludwig II of Bavaria and under Otto of Bavaria.

== Biography ==
Von Heinleth was born on 24 October 1823, in Munich, to a judicial counselor (Appellations-Gerichtsrat). He started his military career in the Infanterie-Leib-Regiment. After passing his company officer career, since 1858 in the rank of a Hauptmann, he became Major of the general staff in 1866. During the Franco-Prussian War he served in the rank of an Oberstleutnant, later in the rank Oberst, as chief of staff of the I Royal Bavarian Corps, which was led by General Von der Tann. After his advancement to Major General and Brigadier he stood with the occupation brigade in Metz after 1875. In 1878, he became Chief of the General Staff of the Army, and in 1882 he became Lieutenant General and division commander, before he served as war minister from 1 May 1885 to 9 May 1890. Ritter von Heinleth withdrew for health reasons. He died on 26 February 1895, aged 71, in Munich, where he was buried in the Old Southern Cemetery.

== Awards ==
- Military Order of Max Joseph

Military offices
Preceded by Max Graf von Bothmer	Quartermaster General / Chief of the General Staff (Kingdom of Bavaria); 1878 – 1881	Succeeded by Hugo Ritter von Diehl
Government offices
Preceded by Joseph Maximilian Ritter von Maillinger	Ministers of War (Bavaria); 1885 – 1890	Succeeded by Benignus Ritter von Safferling
