= Philipp von Hellingrath =

Bavarian General der Kavallerie and War Minister

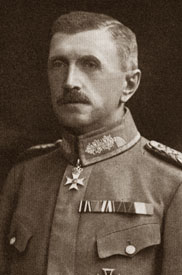
Philipp von Hellingrath.

Philipp von Hellingrath (22 February 1862 – 13 December 1939) was a Bavarian General der Kavallerie and the last War Minister under Ludwig III of Bavaria.

== Life ==
Von Hellingrath was born in Munich, Kingdom of Bavaria. He achieving the Abitur, he joined the 1st Royal Bavarian Heavy Cavalry “Prince Charles of Bavaria” in 1880, became Lieutenant of the 2nd Royal Bavarian Uhlans King in 1882, and visited the Bavarian Kriegsakademie (war academy) from 1887 to 1890. Two years later he became Hofkavalier (court cavalier) of Duke Karl-Theodor in Bavaria, in 1893 adjutant of the 4th Cavalry Brigade and was advanced to the rank of a Rittmeister in 1897. After 1899 he was squadron commander in the 1st Chevauleger Regiment, was transferred to the general staff of the 3rd Royal Bavarian Division in 1902 and advanced to Major in 1903. In 1905 he served in the general staff of the I Royal Bavarian Corps, and shortly after that in the central of the General Staff. In 1907 he became Oberstleutnant and commander of the 4th Chevauleger Regiment, in 1909 he became Oberst and commander of the 3rd Cavalry Brigade, and was made Major General in 1912. In 1914 he became commander of the 6th Cavalry Brigade. With the beginning of World War I he was made inspector of the Etappen-Inspektion (back bases inspection unit) of the 6th Army, shortly after that he was advanced to Lieutenant General and became military representative of Bavaria in the general German headquarters. In 1915 he took part as divisional commander in the campaigns against France, Lithuania and Courland. On 11 December 1916 he became war minister and representative of Bavaria at the Federal Council of the German Empire. He was advanced to the rank of General der Kavallerie on 28 May 1918. On 8 November the same year Albert Roßhaupter followed as the first war minister of the new Freistaat. Von Hellingrath was retired on 25 November 1918 and died in his hometown in 1939.

== Awards (selection) ==
- Ritterkreuz of the Military Order of Max Joseph, 27 April 1915
- Kommandeurkreuz of the Military Order of Max Joseph, 18 August 1916
- Knight 1st Class with Swords of the Order of the Red Eagle, 14 November 1918

== References and notes ==
Government offices
Preceded by Maximilian Freiherr von Speidel (acting)	Ministers of War (Bavaria); 1916–1918	Succeeded by Albert Roßhaupter
