= Ludwig von Lüder =

180px|Ludwig von Lüder

Ludwig von Lüder (4 February 1795 – 6 March 1862) was a Bavarian major general. He was War Minister under Maximilian II of Bavaria for two times.

Lüder was born in the district of Kusel.

He took part in the campaigns of the Bavarian army from 1813 to 1815. He was promoted to Oberleutnant in 1818 and to captain in 1827, and was inspector of the artillery troops from 1832 to 1836, serving in the Bavarian Auxiliary Corps in Greece. In 1838 he became corps adjutant in the Generalquartiermeister staff, and in 1842 he became head of artillery division in the Bavarian war ministry. He was advanced to Oberstleutnant in 1844, and four years later to the rank of Oberst. In 1848 he became a major general and commander in chief of the Munich garrison. After his period as war minister from 29 May 1849 to 25 March 1855, Lüder served again as commander in chief of Munich for a short time, before he was war minister for a second time after 13 April 1859. On 12 June 1861 he was retired at his own request. He died in Munich the following year.

== References and notes ==
Government offices
Preceded by Wilhelm von Le Suire	Minister of War of Bavaria; 1849 – 1855	Succeeded by Wilhelm Ritter von Manz
Preceded by Wilhelm Ritter von Manz	Minister of War of Bavaria; 1859 – 1861	Succeeded by Moritz von Spies
