= Garde du Corps =

Military unit formed of guards

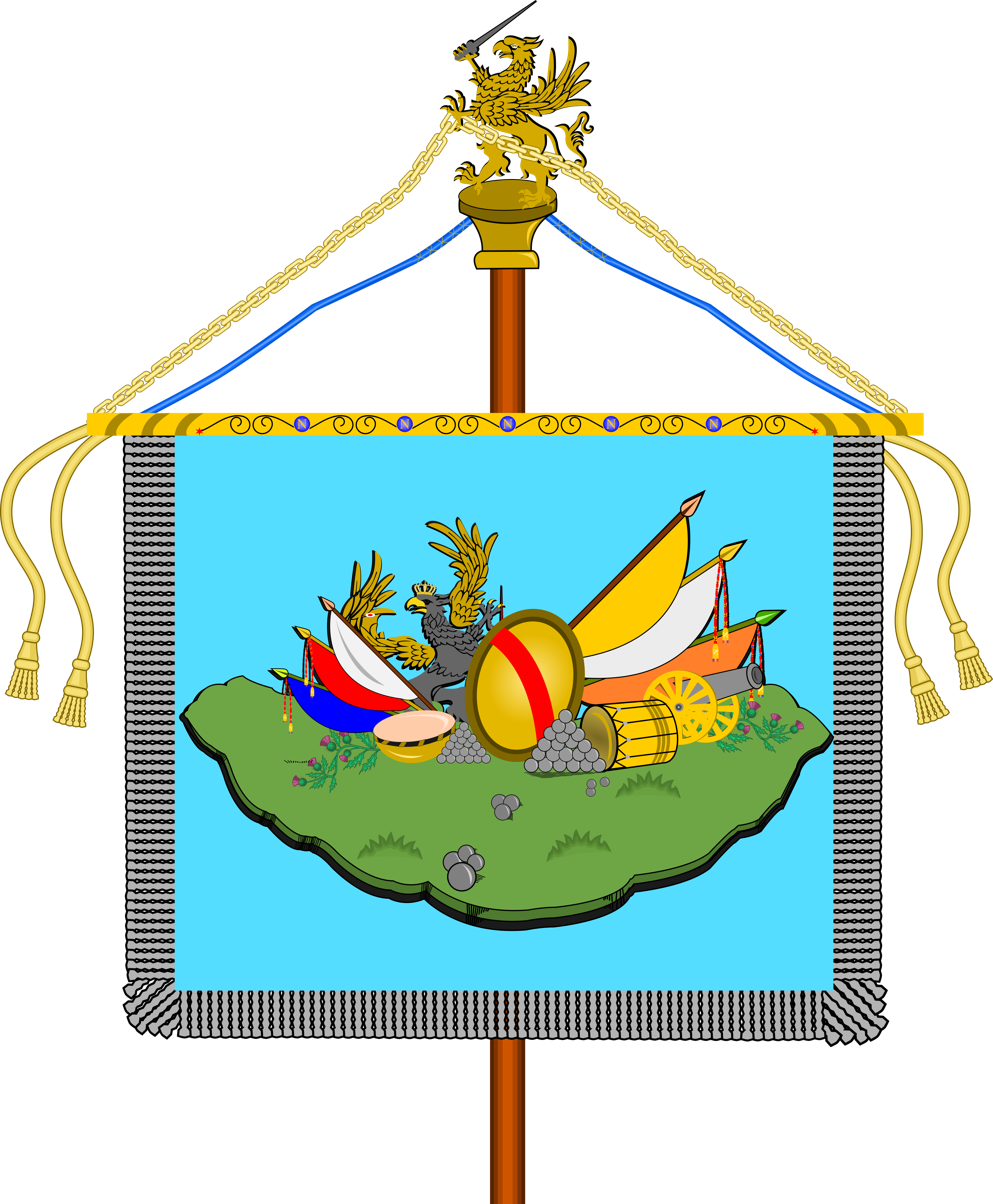
Vexilum of Baden Garde Du Corps

A Garde du Corps (French for lifeguard) is a military unit formed of guards. A Garde du Corps was first established in France in 1445. From the 17th century onwards, the term was used in several German states and also, for example, in the Kingdom of Two Sicilies for several regiments of heavy cavalry, whose proprietary colonel was usually the sovereign.

- In the Electorate of Brandenburg, the Trabant Guards were given the title Garde du Corps in 1692, but were disbanded again around 1715. In 1740, King Frederick II established a cuirassier regiment as his Gardes du Corps, which existed until the Prussian Army was disbanded in 1918. (Only in Prussia was the unit known as the Regiment der Gardes du Corps, as opposed to simply a Garde du Corps in other German states.)
- The Saxon Garde du Corps was formed in 1620, initially going under various names. From 1707 it was permanently titled the Garde du Corps and was stationed in Dresden and the surrounding area. At the time of Augustus the Strong it was a "double regiment" (Doppelregiment) with 883 men. Under his successors it was reduced in size but remained an elite unit. The officers of the Garde du Corps ranked ceremonially a level above those in other regiments and were also paid more. It met its demise in 1812 in the Russian campaign and was never re-established.
- The Electorate of Hesse, the Landgraviate of Hesse and the Margraviate of Baden were also given a regiment of Garde du Corps.
- The Kingdom of Westphalia and Kingdom of Württemberg each had a Garde du Corps squadron from 1808 to 1814 and from 1809 to 1815, respectively. These wore similar uniforms to the French cuirassiers, but were equipped with half-cuirasses and raupenhelm helmets.
- In the Bavarian Army there was a Garde du Corps regiment from 1814, which was merged in 1826 for reasons of cost with the 1st Cuirassiers.
- The Kingdom of Hanover also had a Garde du Corps regiment from 1816 until the disbandment of its army in 1866. It was housed in a barracks on Königsworther Platz in Hanover that had been converted for the purpose in 1736 from a former mule stables. After its annexation by Prussia in 1866, the King's Regiment of Uhlans took over the garrison.
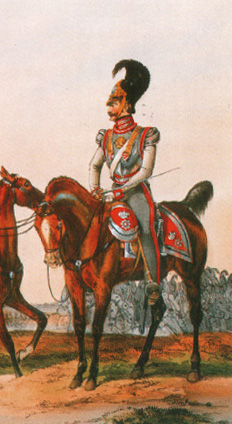
Officer of the Electoral Hessian Garde du Corps of cuirassiers

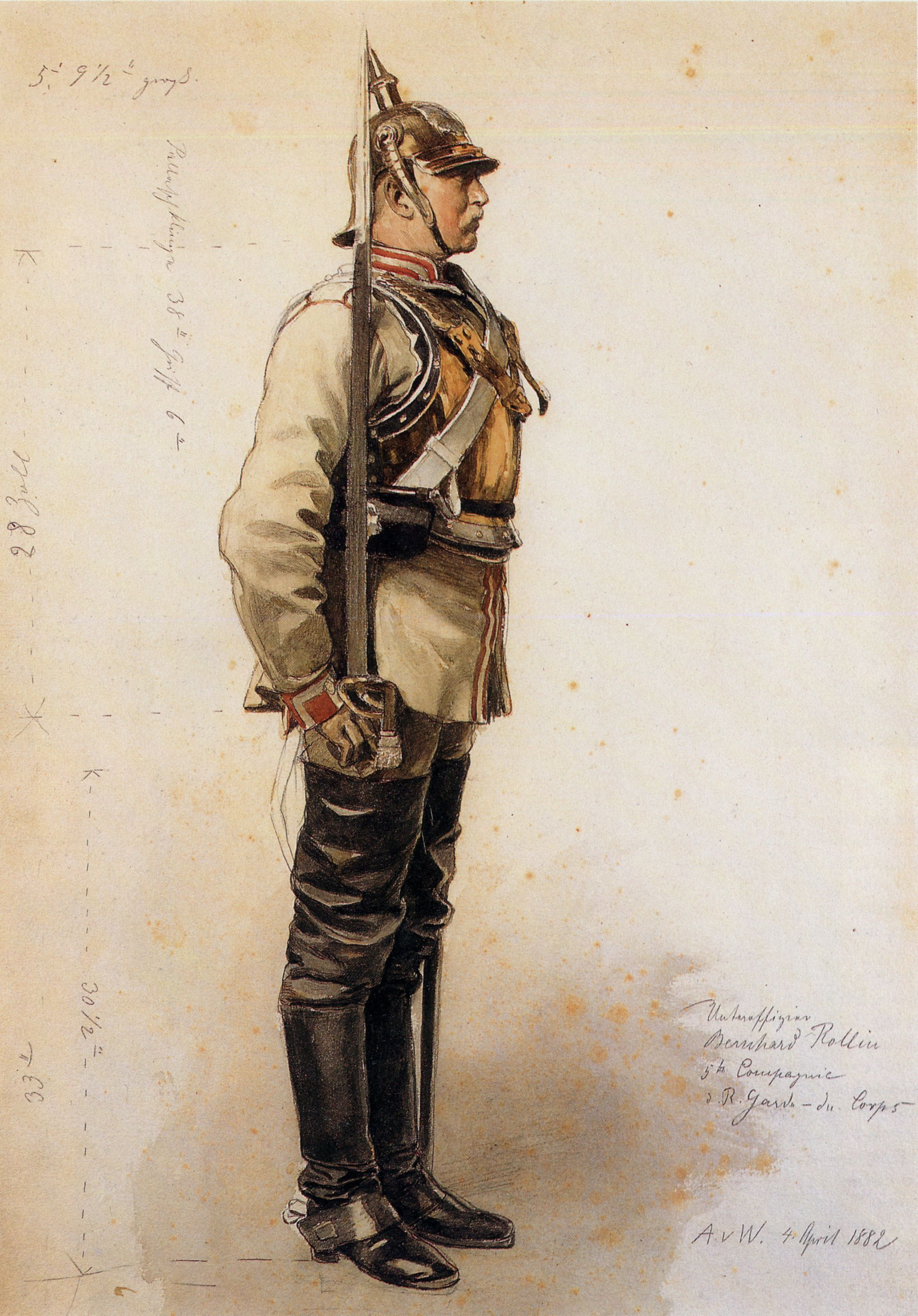
Underofficer of the Prussian Gardes du Corps of cuirassiers

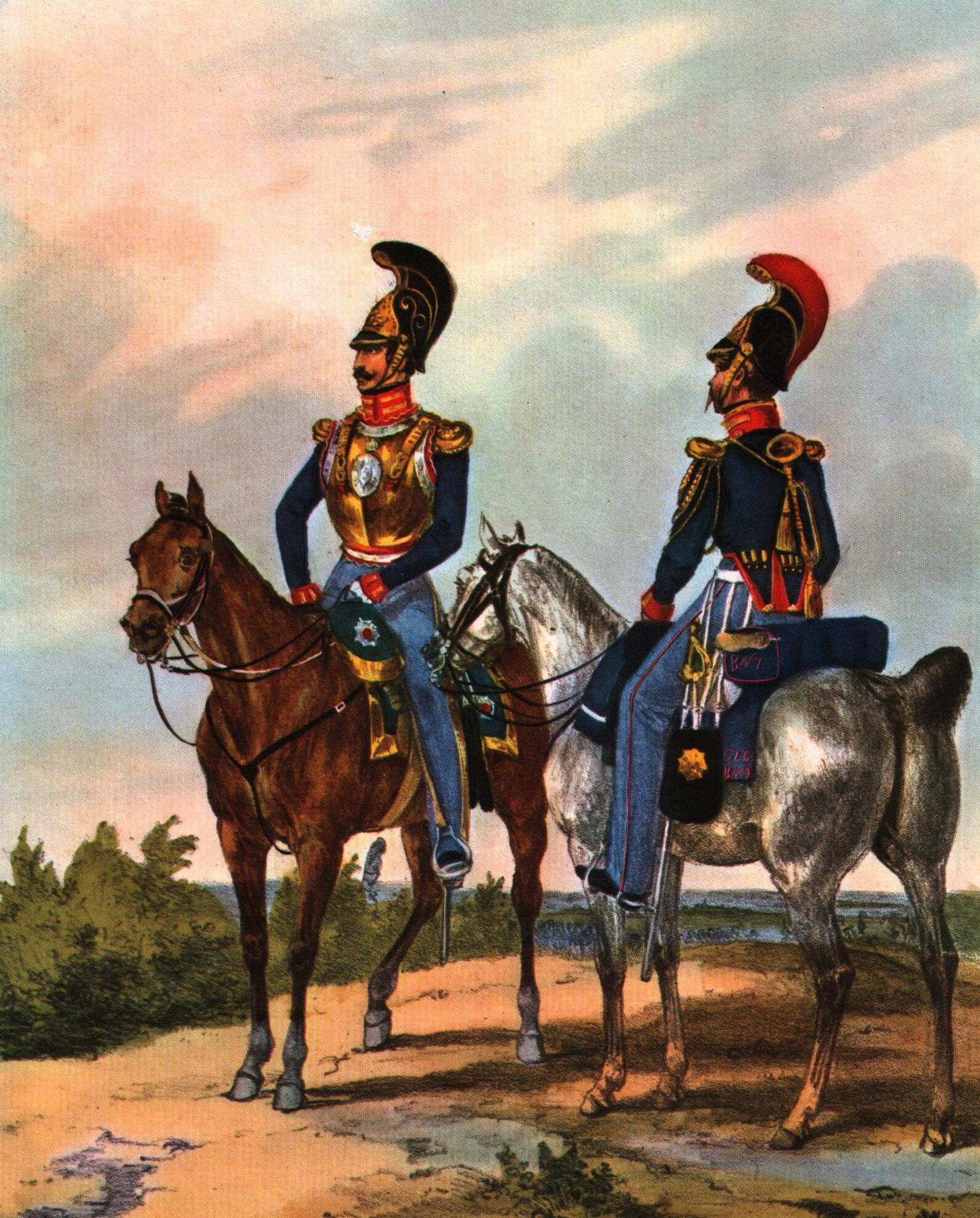
Officer and trumpeter of the Hanoverian Army's Garde du Corps in 1835

== See also ==
- Garde du Corps (France)
- Garde du Corps (Prussia)
- Life guard (military)
- Trabant (military)
