= Moritz von Spies =

Moritz Ritter von Spies (31 December 1805 – 10 October 1862) was a Bavarian Major General and twice War Minister under Maximilian II of Bavaria.

Spies was born in Ansbach. After holding several officer positions in the Bavarian army, also in Greece, which was governed by prince regent Otto, and in the federal war ministry of the Frankfurt Parliament, in 1859 he was promoted Major General in the Generalquartiermeister's staff. In 1860 he was given the command of the genie troops. Spies served as war minister of the Kingdom of Bavaria from 12 June to 11 December 1861 and from 16 June to 10 October 1862 (his death). He died in Munich.

Government offices
Preceded by Ludwig von Lüder	Ministers of War (Bavaria); 1861	Succeeded by Hugo Ritter von Bosch (acting)
Preceded by Bernhard von Heß	Ministers of War (Bavaria); 1862	Succeeded by Bernhard von Heß (acting)
