= Leonhard von Hohenhausen =

Bavarian military and Acting War Minister

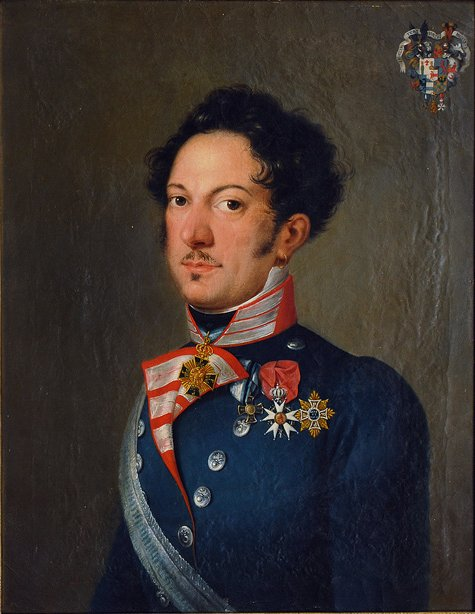
Leonhard von Hohenhausen

Leonhard Freiherr von Hohenhausen und Hochhaus (28 June 1788 – 25 March 1872) was a Bavarian military and Acting War Minister from 1 March 1847 to 1 February 1848. His last military rank was General der Kavallerie.

== Biography ==
Hohenhausen was born in Dachau, the son of Johann Nepomuk Freiherr von Hohenhausen (also called "Peregrinus") by his marriage to Maria Anna, Freiin von Wittorf. He was a nephew of Major-General Sylvius Maximilian von Hohenhausen (born 1738).

Leonhard von Hohenhausen served in the Bavarian army during the campaigns between 1805 and 1815. In 1839 he became Major General and Brigadier. After acting as war minister under Ludwig I of Bavaria from 1847 to 1848 he was advanced to Lieutenant General and became a divisional commander. In 1861 he was appointed as "Generalkapitän", commanding officer of the Hartschiers' a Bavarian life guards troop. In 1867 he was advanced to the rank of a General der Kavallerie. Hohenhausen was also the tutor of Crown Prince Maximilian.

Hohenhausen was married three times. With his first wife Magdalena, née Kleinknecht (1790–1846), he had one daughter, and with his second wife Anna, née Pol (1826–1862), he had five daughters and one son. With his third wife Wilhelmine, née Fischer-Rhomberg (1827–1883), he had no children.

On 27 April 1861 he was awarded with the honorary citizenship by the city of Augsburg. He was buried in the Old Southern Cemetery in Munich.

Government offices
| Preceded by Anton Freiherr von Gumppenberg | Ministers of War (Bavaria); 1847 – 1848 (acting) | Succeeded by Heinrich von der Mark (acting) |
