= Wilhelm von Le Suire =

Wilhelm von Le Suire (9 June 1787 – 10 March 1852), known in Greece as Lessouiros (Greek: Λεσσουΐρος, Λεζουΐρος), was a Bavarian lieutenant general, war minister under Otto of Greece during 1834 and under Maximilian II of Bavaria from 21 November 1848 to 29 May 1849.

== Biography ==
Le Suire was born in Mengeringhausen. He joined the Bavarian army in 1806, and took part as an officer in the campaigns from 1809 to 1815.

During 1833 and 1835 he served in Greece, during the regency council for the underage king, Otto. From May 1834 he served as war minister in the government of Alexandros Mavrokordatos. When he returned to Bavaria, he became Oberst, in 1840 he was advanced to major general and brigadier. In 1848 he was promoted lieutenant general and became a divisional commander, and at the end of the same year was appointed as war minister of the Kingdom of Bavaria. He had to retire because of health issues, and served again as divisional commander until 1852, when he died in Nuremberg.

== References and notes ==
Government offices
Preceded by Karl von Weishaupt	Ministers of War (Bavaria); 1848–1849	Succeeded by Ludwig von Lüder
