= Aldenhoven =

- Municipality
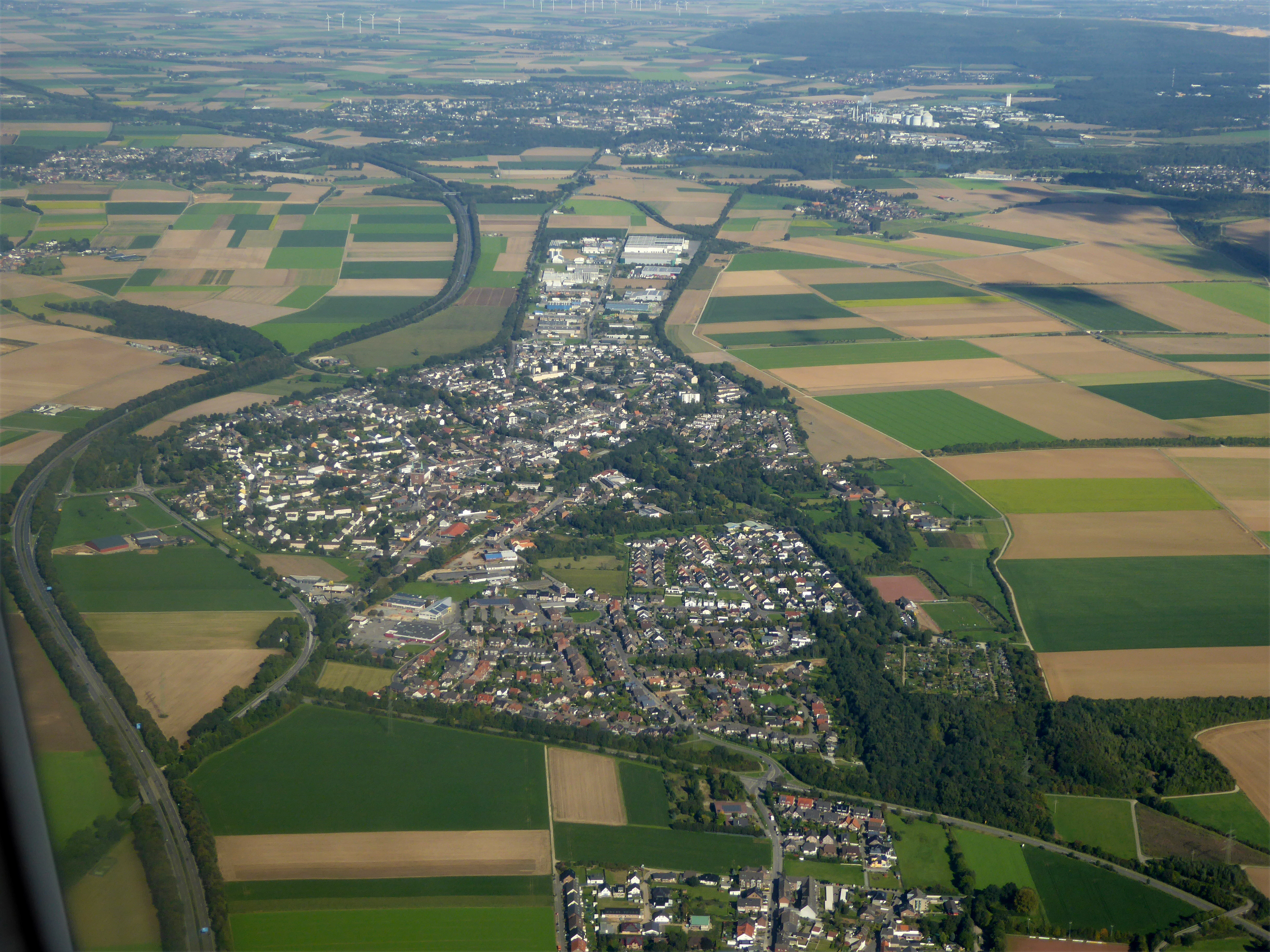
- Aerial view

- Coat of arms

- Location of Aldenhoven within Düren district
- Interactive map of Aldenhoven
- Location within Germany Location within North Rhine-Westphalia
- Coordinates: 50°53′45″N 06°16′59″E
- Country: Germany
- State: North Rhine-Westphalia
- Admin. region: Köln
- District: Düren
- Subdivisions: 7

Government
  - Mayor (2020–25): Ralf Claßen (CDU)

Area
  - Total: 44.25 km^{2} (17.09 sq mi)
- Elevation: 114 m (374 ft)

Population (2025-12-31)
  - Total: 14,383
  - Density: 325.0/km^{2} (841.8/sq mi)
- Time zone: UTC+01:00 (CET)
  - Summer (DST): UTC+02:00 (CEST)
- Postal codes: 52457
- Dialling codes: 02464
- Vehicle registration: DN / JÜL
- Website: www.aldenhoven.de

Aldenhoven (German pronunciation: [ˈaldn̩hoːfn̩]) is a municipality in the district of Düren in the state of North Rhine-Westphalia, Germany. It is located approximately 5 km south-west of Jülich, 5 km north of Eschweiler and 20 km north-east of Aachen.

== Population ==
Historical population

Year	Pop.	±% p.a.
1965	13,511	—
1970	13,597	+0.13%
1975	12,654	−1.43%
1980	12,304	−0.56%
1985	11,746	−0.92%
1990	12,431	+1.14%
1995	13,247	+1.28%

Year	Pop.	±% p.a.
2000	13,687	+0.66%
2005	14,271	+0.84%
2010	13,922	−0.49%
2015	13,932	+0.01%
2020	13,787	−0.21%
2025	14,383	+0.85%

Source: Landesdatabank Nordrhein-Westfalen

== Gallery ==
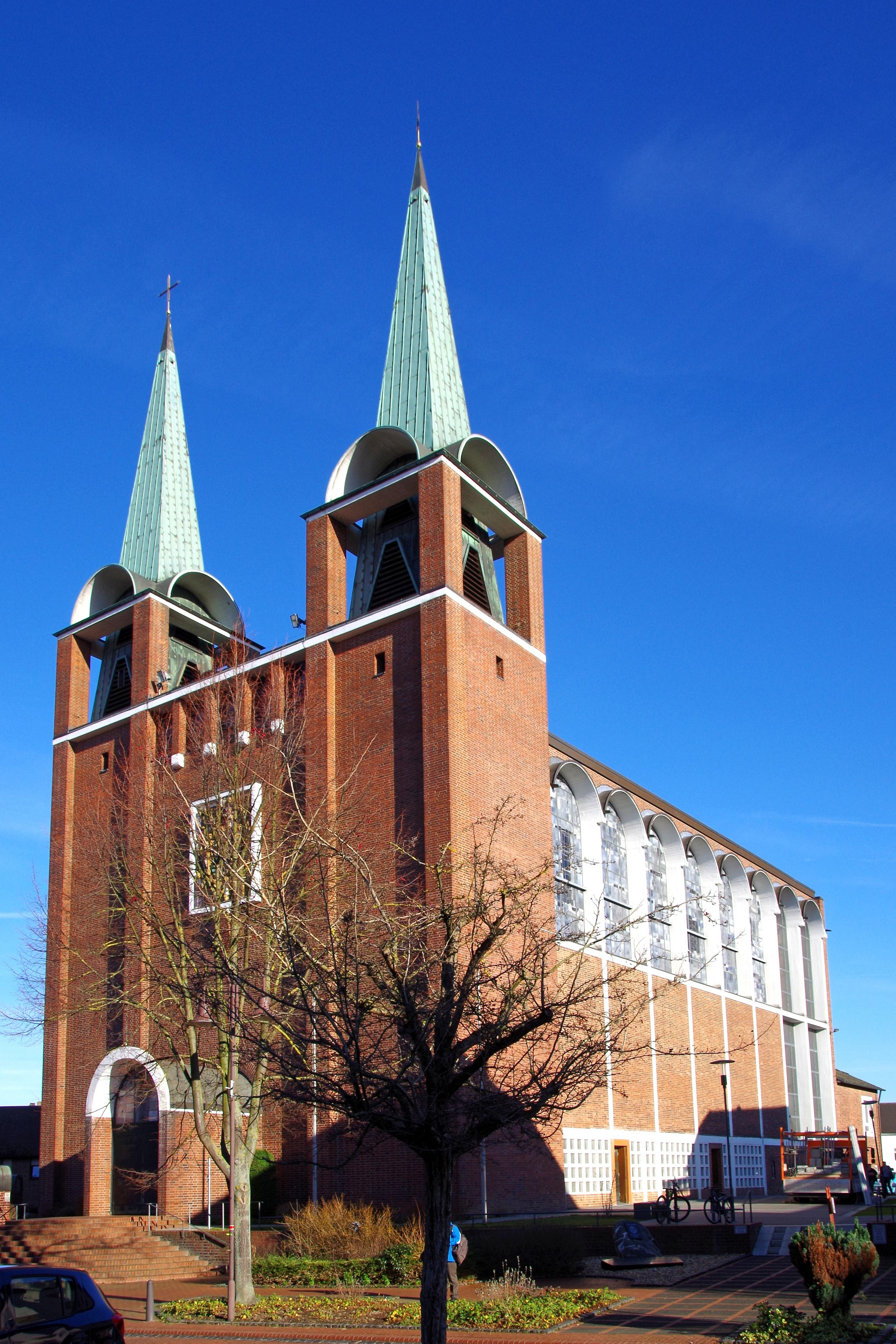
Aldenhoven, church

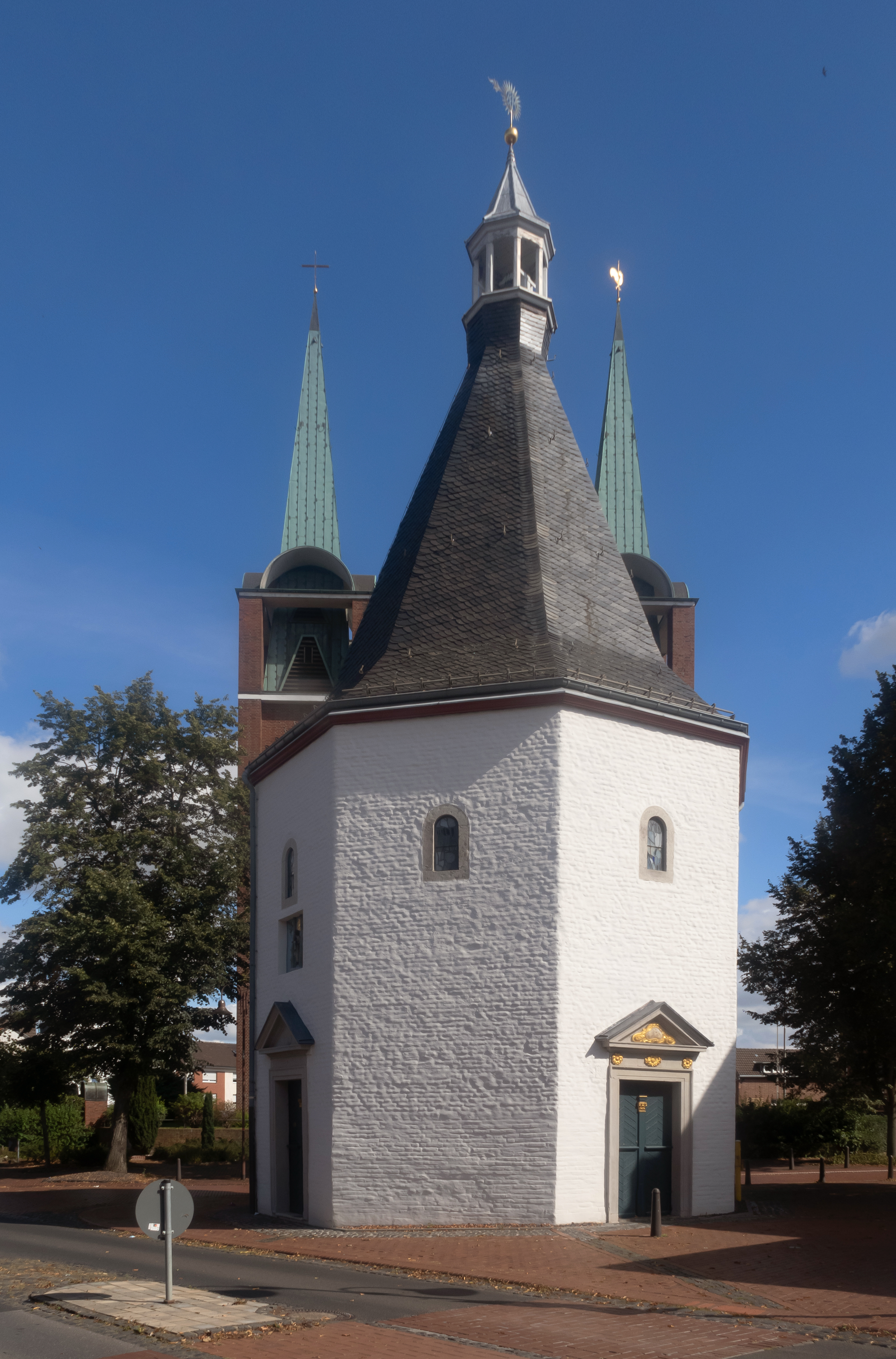
Aldenhoven, chapel

== Notable people ==
- Heinrich von der Mark (1784-1865), Bavarian lieutenant-general and minister of war
- Edmund Emundts (1790-1871) Lord Mayor of Aachen
- Jürgen Fliege (born 1947), television pastor, in the 1980s evangelical pastor in Aldenhoven
- Reinhold Yabo (born 1992), German footballer

== Twin Town ==
Aldenhoven is twinned with the (France) French town of Albert.
