= Georg von Weinrich =

Georg von Weinrich (11 January 1768 – 12 December 1836) was a Bavarian military officer and served as War Minister from 31 January 1829 until his death in 1836. He was born in Mainz and died in Munich.

== Biography ==
Weinrich studied at the University of Mainz. In 1785 he joined the cadet corps of the Electorate of Mainz, was advanced to the rank of an Unterleutnant in 1787, and took part in the campaigns from 1792 to 1800, and in 1815. In 1807 he became Major, and in 1810 Oberstleutnant in the forces of the Grand Duchy of Frankfurt. After the Congress of Vienna he was acquired by the Bavarian army, became Oberst in 1815, and in 1825 Brigadier and Major General. In 1827, he became commander of Fortress Marienberg. In 1829 he became war minister of the Kingdom of Bavaria under King Ludwig, and was advanced to the rank of a Lieutenant General in 1834. On 28 October 1835 Weinrich was given the command of an infantry regiment, which was named thenceforward Infanterie-Regiment "Weinrich", and for a time after his death became the Infanterie-Regiment "vacant Weinrich".

== References and notices ==
Government offices
Preceded by Nikolaus Hubert Freiherr von Maillot de la Treille	Ministers of War (Bavaria); 1829–1836	Succeeded by Franz Xaver Freiherr von Hertling
