= Richard Scheid =

Richard Scheid (11 May 1876 – 19 February 1962) was a Bavarian author, unionist and politician of the Independent Social Democratic Party of Germany (USPD).

Scheid was president of the Munich labor unions' education committee. From 1911 to 1919 he was community representative, after December 1918 government representative at the deputy general command of the I Royal Bavarian Corps, and from 1918 to 1919 he was headman of the Bavarian soldiers' council. After the assassination of Kurt Eisner, he was designated by the Rätekongress (council of people's commissioners) and followed Albert Roßhaupter on his post as minister for military affairs (war minister). Officially he became minister under Martin Segitz on 1 March 1919. Under Segitz's successor Johannes Hoffmann, he could not hold his post after 17 March 1919 because he was member of the USPD. So the Zentralrat (central council) suggested to the Rätekongress to vote for Ernst Schneppenhorst, who was a member of the Majority Social Democratic Party of Germany (MSPD).

== References and notices ==
Government offices
Preceded by Albert Roßhaupter	Ministers of War (Bavaria); 1919	Succeeded by Ernst Schneppenhorst
