= Anton von Gumppenberg =

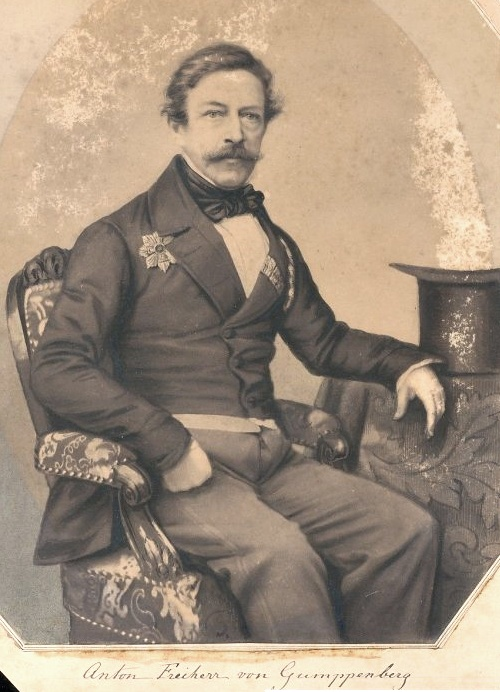
Anton von Gumppenberg in 1850

Anton Joseph Freiherr von Gumppenberg (10 January 1787 – 5 April 1855) was a Bavarian military and War Minister from 9 June 1839 to 1 March 1847. His last military rank was General der Infanterie.

== Biography ==
Gumppenberg was born in Breitenbrunn, Upper Palatinate. After his studies of silviculture, he joined the Bavarian infantry in 1805 and took part in campaigns until 1815. In 1810 he was promoted to captain and became adjutant to Crown Prince Ludwig. In 1812 he became major, in 1817 Oberstleutnant and in 1823 Oberst. In 1825 he became Flügeladjutant of King Ludwig I of Bavaria, became a temporary major general in 1932, and was advanced to this rank in 1837. In 1838 he became brigadier, was Bavarian war minister from 1839 to 1847, afterwards he was again Brigadier, and one year later he became lieutenant general and commander of the 2nd Royal Bavarian Division. In 1849 he became commander of the II Army Corps, and was transferred to the rank of a General der Infanterie in 1855. He died in Munich.

Government offices
Preceded by Friedrich Freiherr von Hertling (acting)	Ministers of War (Bavaria); 1839–1847	Succeeded by Leonhard Freiherr von Hohenhausen (acting)
