= Albrecht Besserer von Thalfingen =

- Born: 8 October 1787
- Died: 1 January 1839 (aged 51)
- Military career
- Allegiance: Kingdom of Bavaria
- Branch: Bavarian Army
- Rank: General
- Conflicts: Napoleonic Wars

Albrecht Theodorich Freiherr Besserer von Thalfingen (8 October 1787 – 1 February 1839) was a Bavarian General, Hofmarschall of Maximilian I Joseph of Bavaria, and Acting War Minister under Ludwig I of Bavaria from 1 November 1838 to 28 January 1839.

Besserer, a member of the Besserer von Thalfingen line, was born in Langenau and died in Munich. On 26 September 1819 he married Caroline Adelheid Walburga Josepha Wilhelmina Freiin von Verger (1789–1870). The couple had two children, Maximilian Joseph Aloys (born 1820) and Therese Sophia (born 1824).

Government offices
Preceded by Franz Xaver von Freiherr Hertling	Ministers of War (Bavaria); 1838–1839 (acting)	Succeeded by Friedrich Freiherr von Hertling (acting)
