= Karl von Weishaupt =

Carl von Weishaupt
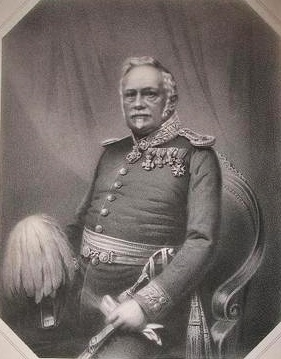
- Born: 11 August 1787; Regensburg, Holy Roman Empire
- Died: 18 December 1853 (aged 66); Munich, Kingdom of Bavaria
- Military career
- Allegiance: Kingdom of Bavaria
- Branch: Bavarian Army
- Service years: 1804–1853
- Rank: Generalleutnant
- Conflicts: Napoleonic Wars
- Other work: Bavarian Ministers of War

Carl also Karl Romanus von Weishaupt (11 August 1787 – 18 December 1853) was a Bavarian lieutenant general and War Minister under Maximilian II of Bavaria from 5 April to 21 November 1848.

== Biography ==
Weishaupt, one of four sons of philosopher Adam Weishaupt and his second wife Anna Maria (née Sausenhofer), was born in Regensburg. He studied at the University of Altdorf and was taught by Franz Xaver von Zach in Gotha. In 1804 he was made to a lieutenant of the general staff due to his cooperation at geodetical works. He took part primarily as an infantryman, then as an artillerist in the campaigns of the Bavarian army during the years 1805 to 1815, since 1812 in the rank of a Hauptmann, and became prisoner of war until 1813. In 1826 he was advanced to major, and served as head of division for artillery affairs in the Bavarian war ministry until 1829. After studying artillery installations in England and France, he became head of a cannon foundry in Augsburg in 1831. In 1840 he became Oberstleutnant and artillery director in Fort Landau. When he got a deployment in the main direction of armory in Munich in 1844, he was appointed Oberst. During his short time as war minister, he became major general and brigadier in 1848, and one day before he died in Munich, he was made lieutenant general.

His brother Eduard (died 1864) was also a general. His youngest brother Alfred (1795–1872) was a higher council for mining and salines (Oberberg- und Salinenrat) in Berchtesgaden, and was knight (Ritter) of the Order of Merit of the Bavarian Crown (Verdienstorden der Bayerischen Krone) and member of the Order of Saint Michael.

== Notes and references ==
Government offices
Preceded by Heinrich von der Mark (acting)	Ministers of War (Bavaria); 1848	Succeeded by Wilhelm von Le Suire
