= Otto Kreß von Kressenstein =

German general (1850–1929)

Freiherr Otto Kreß von Kressenstein
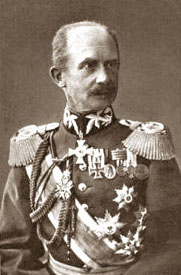
- Kreß von Kressenstein in 1912
- Born: 13 September 1850; Germersheim, Kingdom of Bavaria, German Confederation
- Died: 19 February 1929 (aged 78)
- Military career
- Allegiance: Kingdom of Bavaria; German Empire
- Branch: Bavarian Army
- Service years: 1869–1916
- Rank: Colonel General
- Commands: 1st Royal Bavarian Heavy Cavalry Regiment; 4th Royal Bavarian Cavalry Brigade; 1st Royal Bavarian Division
- Conflicts: Franco-Prussian War; World War I
- Other work: Bavarian Minister of War

Paul Otto Felix Freiherr Kreß von Kressenstein (13 September 1850 – 19 February 1929) was a Bavarian Colonel General and Minister of War from 16 February 1912 to 7 December 1916.

== Biography ==
Kreß von Kressenstein came from the old Nuremberg patrician family Kreß von Kressenstein. According to the dance statute, the family was one of the new lines eligible to participate in government in the free imperial city and was represented on the city council for centuries.

Kreß von Kressenstein was born in Germersheim. After joining the Bavarian cadet corps he served as an officer candidate in the 2nd Royal Bavarian Chevauleger Regiment. He served in the Franco-Prussian War with the rank of a Lieutenant. From 1874 to 1877 he visited the Bavarian Kriegsakademie (war academy) in Munich. With the rank of a captain he was transferred to the staff of the II Royal Bavarian Corps. In 1888 he became Rittmeister, in 1891 Major, and was transferred to the 1st Royal Bavarian Heavy Cavalry Regiment in 1893, where he became lieutenant colonel in 1896. In the following year he became commander of the 6th Royal Bavarian Chevauleger Regiment "Prince Albrecht of Prussia", in 1898 colonel, and in 1901 Major General. In 1902 he received command of the 4th Royal Bavarian Cavalry Brigade. He was made Lieutenant General and named Inspector of the Cavalry Troops in 1904. From 1906, Kressenstein became the commander of the 1st Royal Bavarian Division. His successful command of those units caught the eyes of King Ludwig III. He was selected to replace Carl von Horn as Minister of War in 1912, and was promoted to Colonel General on 1 August 1914. He resigned in 1916 and died in Munich. One of his sons was the later general Franz Otto Freiherr Kreß von Kressenstein.

Government offices
| Preceded by Carl Graf von Horn | Minister of War (Bavaria); 1912–1916 | Succeeded by Maximilian Freiherr von Speidel (acting) |
