= Franz Xaver von Hertling =

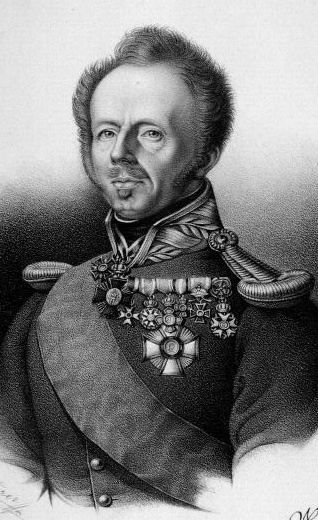
Franz Xaver Joseph Ignaz Freiherr von Hertling.

Franz Xaver Joseph Ignaz Freiherr von Hertling (28 June 1780 – 13 September 1844) was a Bavarian lieutenant general and War Minister from 12 December 1836 until 11 November 1838.

== Biography ==
Hertling was born in Ladenburg, the son of Jakob Anton von Hertling and Maria Anna Antonia Juliana, née von Weiler. He joined the Bavarian army in the last decade of the 18th century. On 1 August 1816, when he was in the rank of an Oberst, he married Maria Anna, née von Kalkhof. On 17 May 1817 his first child Caroline Friederike Wilhelmine Antonie was born, and on 1 September 1822 his first son Maximilian Joseph. In 1824 he became major general and brigadier, and one year later on 1 January his second son, Philipp Theodor Joseph, was born. In 1836 he was promoted to lieutenant general and became commander of the 4th Royal Bavarian Division and war minister of the Kingdom of Bavaria. Hertling retired in 1838 and died in Munich. His brother Johann Friedrich Maximilian Joseph was Acting War Minister of Bavaria in 1839.

== Awards ==
- Knight's Cross of the Military Order of Max Joseph, 1814

Government offices
Preceded by Georg von Weinrich	Ministers of War (Bavaria); 1836–1838	Succeeded by Albrecht Freiherr Besserer von Thalfingen (acting)
