= 6th Royal Bavarian Division =

6th Royal Bavarian Division (6. Königlich Bayerische Division); from August 2, 1914, 6th Bavarian Infantry Division (6. Bayerische Infanterie-Division)
- Active: 1900–19
- Country: Kingdom of Bavaria, German Empire
- Branch: Army
- Type: Infantry (in peacetime included cavalry)
- Size: Approximately 18,000 (on mobilisation in 1914)
- Part of: III Royal Bavarian Corps (III. Kgl. Bayer. Armeekorps)
- Garrison/HQ: Regensburg
- Engagements: World War I: Battle of the Frontiers, Battle of Verdun, Battle of the Somme, Battle of Arras (1917), Passchendaele, German spring offensive, First Battle of the Somme (1918), Second Battle of the Somme (1918)

The 6th Royal Bavarian Division was a unit of the Royal Bavarian Army which served within the Imperial German Army. The division was formed on April 1, 1900, and was headquartered in Regensburg. In Bavarian sources, it was not generally referred to as a "Royal Bavarian" division, as this was considered self-evident, but outside Bavaria, this designation was used for it, and other Bavarian units, to distinguish them from similarly numbered Prussian units. The division was part of the III Royal Bavarian Army Corps.

== Combat chronicle ==
During World War I, the division served on the Western Front. It fought initially in the Battle of the Frontiers. It then served in the area between the Meuse and Moselle Rivers until July 1916, seeing action on the Meuse heights, by St. Mihiel, and in the Bois-brulé. In July and August 1916, the division fought in the Battle of Verdun, and afterwards went into combat in the Argonne Forest. At the end of September 1916, it fought in the Battle of the Somme. The division suffered heavy losses in both of these battles. From October 1916 into 1918, the division occupied the trenchlines in Flanders and the Artois, and fought in the Battle of Arras and the Battle of Passchendaele. It then fought in the 1918 German spring offensive, fighting in the First Battle of the Somme (1918), also known as the Second Battle of the Somme (to distinguish it from the 1916 battle). After a period in the trenches in Flanders and near Verdun, the division fought in the Second Battle of the Somme (1918), also known as the Third Battle of the Somme. It continued resisting various Allied offensives until the end of the war. Allied intelligence rated the division as one of the very best German divisions.

== Pre–World War I peacetime organization ==
In 1914, the peacetime organization of the 6th Royal Bavarian Division was as follows:

- 11. bayerische Infanterie-Brigade
  - Kgl. Bayerisches 10. Infanterie-Regiment König Ludwig
  - Kgl. Bayerisches 13. Infanterie-Regiment Franz Josef I., Kaiser von Österreich und Apostolischer König von Ungarn
- 12. bayerische Infanterie-Brigade
  - Kgl. Bayerisches 6. Infanterie-Regiment Kaiser Wilhelm, König von Preußen
  - Kgl. Bayerisches 11. Infanterie-Regiment von der Tann
- 6. bayerische Kavallerie-Brigade
  - Kgl. Bayerisches 2. Chevaulegers-Regiment Taxis
  - Kgl. Bayerisches 7. Chevaulegers-Regiment Prinz Alfons
- 6. bayerische Feldartillerie-Brigade
  - Kgl. Bayerisches 3. Feldartillerie-Regiment Prinz Leopold
  - Kgl. Bayerisches 8. Feldartillerie-Regiment Prinz Heinrich von Preußen

== Order of battle on mobilization ==
On mobilization, in August 1914, at the beginning of World War I, most divisional cavalry, including brigade headquarters, was withdrawn to form cavalry divisions or split up among divisions as reconnaissance units. Divisions received engineer companies and other support units from their higher headquarters. The 6th Bavarian Division was renamed the 6th Bavarian Infantry Division. The division's initial wartime organization (major units) was as follows:

- 11. bayerische Infanterie-Brigade
  - Kgl. Bayerisches 10. Infanterie-Regiment König Ludwig
  - Kgl. Bayerisches 13. Infanterie-Regiment Franz Josef I., Kaiser von Österreich und Apostolischer König von Ungarn
- 12. bayerische Infanterie-Brigade
  - Kgl. Bayerisches 6. Infanterie-Regiment Kaiser Wilhelm, König von Preußen
  - Kgl. Bayerisches 11. Infanterie-Regiment von der Tann
- Kgl. Bayerisches 2. Chevaulegers-Regiment Taxis
- 6. bayerische Feldartillerie-Brigade
  - Kgl. Bayerisches 3. Feldartillerie-Regiment Prinz Leopold
  - Kgl. Bayerisches 8. Feldartillerie-Regiment Prinz Heinrich von Preußen
- 2.Kompanie/Kgl. Bayerisches 3. Pionier-Bataillon

== Late World War I organization ==
Divisions underwent many changes during the war, with regiments moving from division to division, and some being destroyed and rebuilt. During the war, most divisions became triangular - one infantry brigade with three infantry regiments rather than two infantry brigades of two regiments (a "square division"). The 6th Bavarian Infantry Division was triangularized in January 1917, dissolving the 12th Bavarian Infantry Brigade headquarters and sending the 11th Bavarian Infantry Regiment to the newly formed 16th Bavarian Infantry Division. An artillery commander replaced the artillery brigade headquarters, the cavalry was further reduced, and the engineer contingent was increased. Divisional signals commanders were established to better control communications, a major problem in coordinating infantry and artillery operations during World War I. The division's order of battle on February 21, 1918, was as follows:

- 11. bayerische Infanterie-Brigade
  - Kgl. Bayerisches 6. Infanterie-Regiment Kaiser Wilhelm, König von Preußen
  - Kgl. Bayerisches 10. Infanterie-Regiment König
  - Kgl. Bayerisches 13. Infanterie-Regiment Franz Josef I., Kaiser von Österreich und Apostolischer König von Ungarn
  - Kgl. Bayerische Maschinengewehr-Scharfschützen-Abteilung Nr. 3
- 3.Eskadron/Kgl. Bayerisches 2. Chevaulegers-Regiment Taxis
- Kgl. Bayerischer Artillerie-Kommandeur 6
  - Kgl. Bayerisches 3. Feldartillerie-Regiment Prinz Leopold
  - II.Bataillon/Kgl. Bayerisches Reserve-Fußartillerie-Regiment Nr. 1
- Kgl. Bayerisches 6. Pionier-Bataillon
  - Kgl. Bayerische Pionier-Kompanie Nr. 11
  - Kgl. Bayerische Pionier-Kompanie Nr. 12
  - Kgl. Bayerische Minenwerfer-Kompanie Nr. 6
- Kgl. Bayerischer Divisions-Nachrichten-Kommandeur 6
