= Friedrich von Hertling =

Bavarian military officer

Johann Friedrich Maximilian Joseph Freiherr von Hertling (14 October 1781 – 4 August 1850) was a Bavarian Lieutenant General that acted as the War Minister for Bavaria from 28 January until 9 June 1839. He was the brother of Franz Xaver von Hertling.

== Biography ==
Hertling was born in Ladenburg, the son of Jakob Anton von Hertling and Maria Anna Antonia Juliana, née von Weiler. Like his brother, Franz Xaver, he joined the Bavarian army in the last decade of the 18th century and took part in all of its campaigns between 1800 and 1815. In 1817 he was advanced to Oberst, in 1831 to Major General and Brigadier. One year later, while acting as the war minister of the Kingdom of Bavaria under King Ludwig, he was promoted to Lieutenant General and given responsibility for the army's stud farms and horse recruitment (Gestüts- und Remontierungswesen). Hertling died in Munich.

Government offices
Preceded by Albrecht Freiherr Besserer von Thalfingen (acting)	Ministers of War (Bavaria); 1839 (acting)	Succeeded by Anton Freiherr von Gumppenberg
