= Eduard von Lutz =

German general (1810–1893

Eduard Ritter von Lutz (13 January 1810 – 8 July 1893) was a Bavarian Major General and War Minister under Maximilian II of Bavaria and under Ludwig II of Bavaria.

== Biography ==
Von Lutz was born in Neuburg an der Donau. After passing his company officer career, he was advanced to Major in 1855, and became Oberstleutnant and deputy commander of the Germersheim fortress in 1859. One year after that he became commander of the Kriegsschule. In 1862 he became Oberst and commander of the 2nd Infantry Regiment. Von Lutz was war minister after August 15, 1863. After the Prussian defeat of Bavaria he withdrew on August 1, 1866. He died in Starnberg.

Government offices
Preceded by Bernhard von Heß (acting)	Ministers of War (Bavaria); 1863–1866	Succeeded by Eduard Freiherr von Rotberg (acting)
