= William Hertling =

American novelist

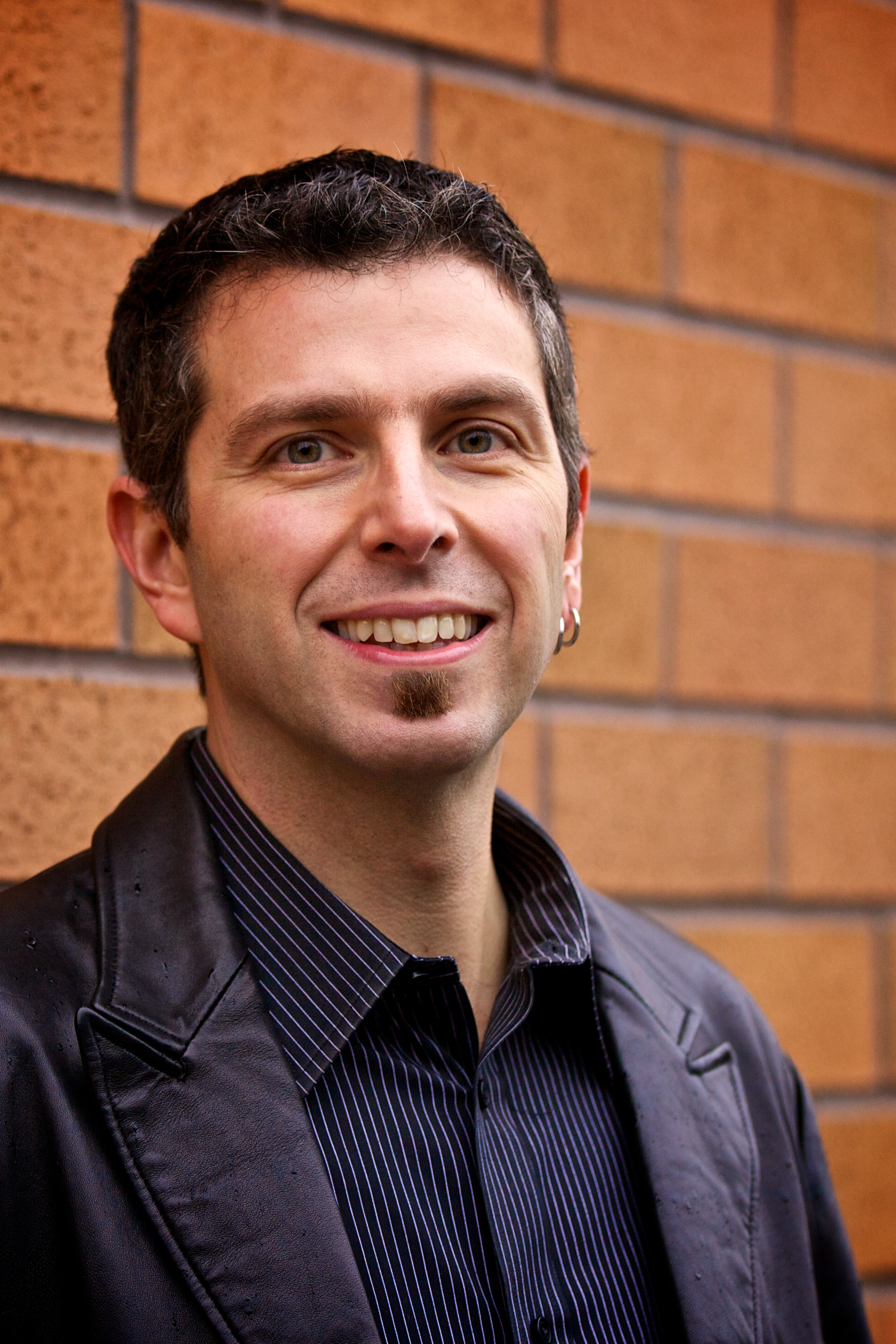
- William Hertling
- Born: January 6, 1970 (age 56); Brooklyn, NY
- Occupations: Author; programmer; web strategist
- Writing career
- Notable works: Avogadro Corp: The Singularity is Closer than it Appears; A.I. Apocalypse; The Last Firewall
- Website: www.williamhertling.com

William Hertling (born 6 January 1970) is an American science fiction writer and programmer. He was a co-founder and Director of Engineering at Tripwire, and a web strategist and software developer at Hewlett-Packard where he obtained numerous software engineering patents in the areas of networking protocols, printing, and web applications.

== Writing ==
Hertling began publishing science fiction in 2011 with Avogadro Corp: The Singularity is Closer than it Appears. Influenced by Ray Kurzweil and Charles Stross, his work examines the emergence of strong artificial intelligence and how humankind reacts to and coexists with AI. The resulting Singularity series has received critical acclaim from Wired and KurzweilAI, as well as notable people in the technology industry, including Brad Feld, Harper Reed, Ben Huh, Amber Case, and John Walker.

Hertling said that a conversation with a friend in 2010 inspired him to write his debut techno-thriller, which marked his transition from a full-time software programmer to a successful sci-fi novelist. Hertling self-published his entire Singularity series via Amazon (Kindle, Createspace, and Audible).

According to the author's Reddit account, Hertling's influences are Cory Doctorow, Charles Stross, Neal Stephenson and the classic cyberpunk works of the 80s (Neuromancer, Hardwired, and Snow Crash). He also reported that instead of sending his book to traditional sci-fi reviewers, he sent it out to those working in cutting-edge tech sectors, including programmers, CTOs, venture capitalists, tech startups, etc.

The first novel, Avogadro Corp, a near-term technothriller, is about the modification of an email language optimization software program giving the software a survival instinct, accidentally creating a self-motivated artificial intelligence. His second novel, A.I. Apocalypse, set ten years later, explores the creation of strong artificial intelligence through software evolution and the resulting organizational principles and values of an AI society. The third book, The Last Firewall, again set ten years further into the future, is a cyberpunk novel examining post-humanism, the effects of social class on AI and humans, and technological unemployment. The fourth novel, The Turing Exception, is set where humans and AI have co-existed peacefully until 2043, where a nanotech event seen as a terrorist act by AI results in the destruction of Miami and large controls placed on AI, and explores the unfolding events revolving around XOR – an AI splinter group with the goal of taking the reign of Earth from humans. Throughout all four novels, the reaction of humans to strong AI, and the coexistence of both groups are recurring themes.

He published his first children's novel in 2014, The Case of the Wilted Broccoli, a detective novel about three elementary school students who solve a food supply chain mystery.

== Awards and Expertise ==
A self-published author, Hertling is a frequent presenter at technical, writing, and science fiction conventions, where he talks about the intersection of science fiction and technology, self-publishing, book marketing, technology, and innovation. He describes his success with self-publishing in Indie and Small Press Book Marketing, his non-fiction manual for marketing books.

He was nominated for the Prometheus Award for Best Novel for A.I. Apocalypse, won Foreword Review's Science Fiction Book of the Year in 2011 for Avogadro Corp, and won Independent Publisher's IPPY Bronze medal for The Last Firewall.

== Bibliography ==
- Avogadro Corp: The Singularity is Closer than it Appears (2011)
- A.I. Apocalypse (2012)
- Indie and Small Press Book Marketing (2012)
- The Last Firewall (2013)
- The Case of the Wilted Broccoli (2014)
- The Turing Exception (2015)
- Kill Process (2016)
- Kill Switch (2018)
