= General of the Cavalry (Germany) =

Obsolete German officer rank

General of the Cavalry General der Kavallerie
- Arabesque and flecktarn suit insignia

- Army shoulder board
- Country: Germany
- Service branch: Army
- Rank: Three-star
- Abolished: 1945
- Next higher rank: Generaloberst
- Next lower rank: Generalleutnant
- Equivalent ranks: See list

General of the Cavalry (German: General der Kavallerie) was a general of the branch rank in the Imperial German Army, Reichswehr and Wehrmacht. It was the second-highest general officer rank below Generaloberst.

Artillery officers of equivalent rank were called General der Artillerie, and infantry officers of equivalent rank General der Infanterie. The Wehrmacht also created General der Panzertruppen (tank troops), General der Gebirgstruppen (mountain troops), General der Pioniere (engineers), General der Flieger (aviators), General der Fallschirmtruppen (parachute troops), and General der Nachrichtentruppen (communications troops).

junior rank Generalleutnant	(Ranks Wehrmacht); General der Kavallerie (General of the branch)	senior rank Generaloberst

== List of officers who were General der Kavallerie ==
Moritz von Bissing, appointed General of the Cavalry in 1902

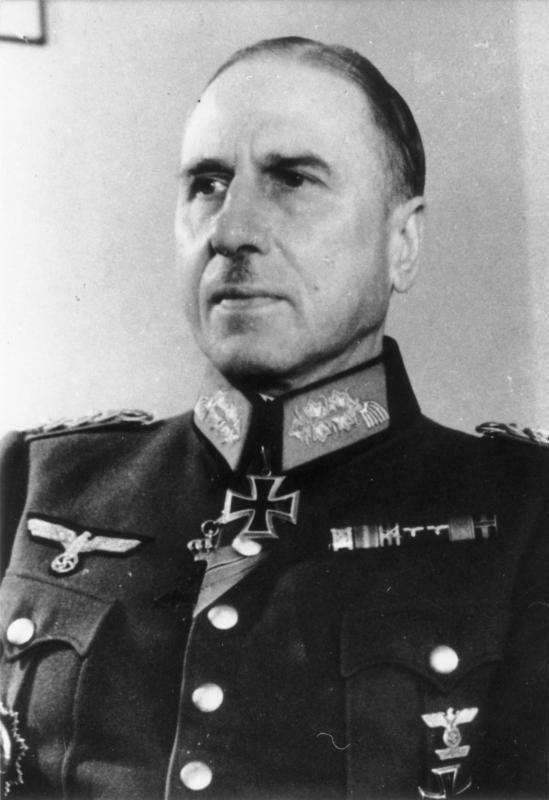
Erick-Oskar Hansen, General of the Cavalry during World War II

- Friedrich von Bernhardi (1849–1930)
- Moritz von Bissing (1844–1917)
- Walter Braemer (1883–1955)
- Friedrich August Peter von Colomb (1775–1854)
- Georg von der Decken (1787–1859)
- Adolf von Deines (1845-1911)
- Karl von Einem (1853–1934)
- Rudolf Koch-Erpach (1886–1971)
- Franz Hermann Günther von Etzel (1862–1948)
- Max von Fabeck (1854–1916)
- Hans Feige (1880–1953)
- Kurt Feldt (1897–1970)
- Rudolf von Frommel (1857–1921)
- Otto von Garnier (1859–1947)
- Ludwig Freiherr von Gebsattel (1857–1930)
- Gottlieb Graf von Haeseler (1836–1919)
- Erick-Oskar Hansen (1889–1967)
- Gustav Harteneck (1892–1984)
- Philipp von Hellingrath (1862–1939)
- Erich Hoepner (1886–1944)
- Ernst von Hoeppner (1860–1922)
- Leonhard von Hohenhausen (1788–1872)
- Gustav von Hollen (1851–1917)
- Alfred von Kühne (1853-1945)
- Philipp Kleffel (1887–1964)
- Paul Ludwig Ewald von Kleist (1881-1954)
- Rudolf Koch-Erpach (1886–1971)
- Carl-Erik Koehler (1895–1958)
- Ernst August Köstring (1876–1953)
- Otto Kreß von Kressenstein (1850–1929)
- Karl Wilhelm Heinrich von Kleist (1836-1917)
- Gebhard Friedrich von Krosigk (1835-1904)
- Maximilian von Laffert (1855–1917)
- Georg Lindemann (1884–1963)
- August von Mackensen (1849–1945)
- Eberhard von Mackensen (1889–1969)
- Georg von der Marwitz (1856–1929)
- Curt von Pfuel of the Pfuel family (1849–1936)
- Ernst Ludwig von Pfuel (1716−1798)
- Wilhelm Malte II of Putbus (1833–1907)
- Georg Adam von Pfuel (1618–1672)
- Prince Friedrich Leopold of Prussia (1865–1931)
- Alfred Bonaventura von Rauch (1824–1900)
- Friedrich von Rauch (1855–1935)
- Gustav Waldemar von Rauch (1819–1890)
- Manfred Freiherr von Richthofen (1855–1939)
- Edwin Graf von Rothkirch und Trach (1888–1980)
- Maximilian von Speidel (1856–1943)
- Leo Geyr von Schweppenburg (1886-1974)
- Wilhelm Karl, Duke of Urach
- Franz Heinrich Schnitzer (1814-1815)
- Alfred von Waldersee (1832–1904)
- Hermann Ludwig von Wartensleben (1826–1921)
- Maximilian von Weichs (1881–1954) (Later promoted to Generalfeldmarschall)
- Siegfried Westphal (1902–1982)
- Christian von Zweibrücken (1782–1859)

== See also ==
- General (Germany)
- Comparative officer ranks of World War II
