= Albert Roßhaupter =

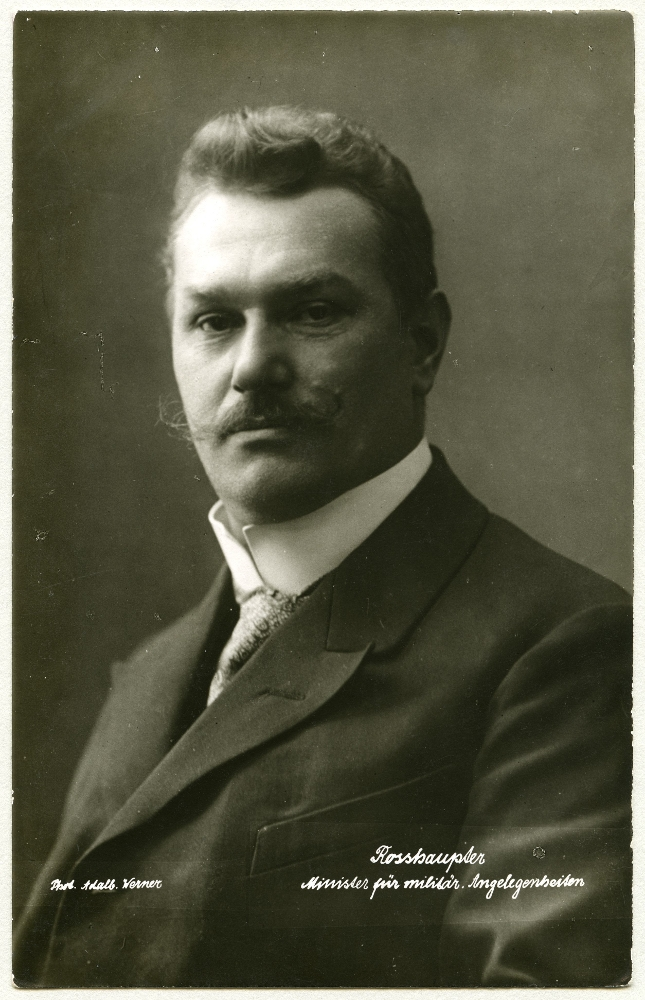
Image of Photo - Albert Roßhaupter

Albert Roßhaupter (8 April 1878 – 14 December 1949) was a Bavarian politician of the Social Democratic Party of Germany (SPD) and editor of several newspapers.

== Biography ==
Roßhaupter was born in Pillnach as son of a small-scale farmer and basket maker. After visiting the elementary school in Munich, he passed a professional lacquer training. In 1897 he joined the SPD, and worked at the central train garages of Munich from 1899 to 1908. After 1900 he was additional district manager of the free-unionized and social democratic Bavarian train garages and factory workers' association (Bayerischer Eisenbahnwerkstätten und Betriebsarbeiterverband), respectively district manager of the Southern German railway and postal workers' union (Süddeutscher Eisenbahn- und Postpersonalverbund). Thenceforward 1907 until 1933, he was member of the Bavarian parliament. In 1909 he became manager and full-time secretary of the Southern German railway and postal workers' union, and was also editor of the union's organ "Süddeutsche Eisenbahn- und Postpersonal-Zeitung" in Nuremberg until 1912. After 1913 he had several jobs in Augsburg, where he was member of the SPD executive committee of Augsburg until 1914, also community mandatory of the city and editor of the "Schwäbische Volkszeitung" (literally: Swabian people's newspaper) until 1920. After his military service during World War I, he was member of the Bavarian SPD commission. As a member of the provisorily parliament he became minister for military affairs (war minister) under Kurt Eisner on 8 November and held the office until 21 February 1919. From 1920 to 1933 he worked as editor of the "Bayerisches Wochenblatt" (literally: Bavarian weekly paper), organ of the agriculture and forestry worker's union in Augsburg and Olching. As the parliamentary leader of the SPD in the Bavarian parliament, he affirmed the disapproval to the Enabling Act of 1933 of the Nazi party (NSDAP) on 29 April 1933. Due to this he was imprisoned in Fürstenfeldbruck and in the Dachau concentration camp from 1933 to 1934, and a few times afterwards, at last again in Dachau in 1944. After World War II he was a leading member of the SPD-KPD workgroup in Munich, and became the first Bavarian Minister of Labor and Social Care on 28 May 1945. During this period, he was also deputy of Minister-President Wilhelm Hoegner from 28 September 1945 to 21 December 1946, deputy president of the preparing constitutional commission from 8 March to 24 June 1946 and member of the constitutional convention (Ger: verfassunggebende Landesversammlung) from 30 June to 26 October 1946. On 20 September 1947 Heinrich Krehle followed on the ministry post. From 1948 to 1949 Roßhaupter was member of the Parlamentarischer Rat in Bonn. He died in Nannhofen. The Albert-Rosshaupter-Straße in Munich is named in honor of him.

== Bibliography ==
- Klaus Warnecke: Albert Rosshaupter: Ein Leben für Freiheit und soziale Gerechtigkeit, Sendling-West-Verlag, Munich ISBN 3-922291-04-X

== References and notes ==
Government offices
Preceded by Philipp von Hellingrath	Ministers of War (Bavaria); 1918–1919	Succeeded by Richard Scheid
Preceded by –	Minister of Labor and Social Care of Bavaria; 1945–1947	Succeeded by Heinrich Krehle
