= Chief of the General Staff (Kingdom of Bavaria) =

Historic government official in Bavaria

The Chief of the General Staff (German: Chef des Generalstabes der Armee) of the Bavarian army was the military leader of the armed forces in the Kingdom of Bavaria.

== Names of the General Staff of the Army commanders ==
- Generalquartiermeister (Quartermaster General, from 1792 to 1805)
- Chef des Generalstabes (from 1805 to 1822)
- Chef des Generalquartiermeisterstabes (Chief of the Quartermaster General Staff, from 1822 to 1840)
- Generalquartiermeister (from 1840 to 1878, after 1883 also inspector of military training institutions)
- Chef des Generalstabes der Armee (after 1878)

== General Staff of the Bavarian Army ==
Originally the General Staff (German: Generalstab) of the Bavarian army was created by prince-elector Charles Theodore, Elector of Bavaria on demand of Sir Benjamin Thompson, Count Rumford in 1792. In 1822 it was renamed under Maximilian I Joseph of Bavaria to Generalquartiermeister. During the reign of Ludwig II of Bavaria, it was renamed once more to Generalstab. The office of the Chief of the General Staff was located in Munich. The General Staff of the army supported the supreme command of the army, and was point of contact for the Truppengeneralstäbe (general staffs of troops), the general staffs of the divisional commands, which were created after 1826, abolished in 1837 and once more deployed in 1847. The General Staff followed the mobile forces on mission, until the Bavarian army was subordinated in case of war to the command of the German Emperor in his function as Bundesfeldherr (federal commander) after 1870. Due to this the commanders of the Bavarian army were under the direct command of the central German military authorities during World War I; on mobilisation most of the Bavarian General Staff became the headquarters of the largely Bavarian 6th Army, with some officers joining the Supreme Army Command.

Name	Title	Term began	Term ended
missing
GM Johann Nepomuk Graf von Triva (1755–1827)	Generalquartiermeister; Chef des Generalstabes	1802	1820
GdI Clemens Freiherr von Raglovich	Chef des Generalstabes	1820	1829(?)
missing
GM Wilhelm Freiherr von Jeetze (1785–1852)	Generalquartiermeister	1847	1848
GL Anton von der Mark (1796–1869)	Generalquartiermeister	1848	1853
GM Philipp Freiherr von Brand zu Neidstein (1796–1870)	Generalquartiermeister	1853	1856
GL Anton von der Mark (1796–1869)	Generalquartiermeister	1856	1866
GM Hermann von Schintling (1816–1870)	Generalquartiermeister	1866	1866
GL Max Graf von Bothmer (1816–1878)	Generalquartiermeister	1866	1878
missing	Generalquartiermeister	1878	1878
GM Adolf von Heinleth (1823–1896)	Chef des Generalstabes der Armee	1878	1881
GdI Hugo Ritter von Diehl (1821–1883)	Chef des Generalstabes der Armee	1881	1883
missing	Chef des Generalstabes der Armee	1883	1883
GL Maximilian Graf von Verri della Bosia (1824–1909)	Chef des Generalstabes der Armee	1883	1888
GL Wilhelm von Staudt (1825–1917)	Chef des Generalstabes der Armee	1888	1893
GL Karl Ritter von Hoffmann (1832–1903)	Chef des Generalstabes der Armee	1893	1895
GL Maximilian Ritter von Giehrl (1840–1896)	Chef des Generalstabes der Armee	1895	1896
missing	Chef des Generalstabes der Armee	1896	1896
GL Karl Ritter von Lobenhoffer (1843–1901)	Chef des Generalstabes der Armee	1896	1901
missing	Chef des Generalstabes der Armee	1901	1901
GL Ernst Freiherr von Barth zu Harmating (1849–1934)	Chef des Generalstabes der Armee	1901	1905
missing	Chef des Generalstabes der Armee	1905	1905
GL Carl Ritter von Endres (1847–1907)	Chef des Generalstabes der Armee	1905	1907
missing	Chef des Generalstabes der Armee	1907	1907
GL Karl von Fasbender (1852–1933)	Chef des Generalstabes der Armee	1907	1908
missing	Chef des Generalstabes der Armee	1908	1908
GM Oskar Ritter und Edler von Xylander (1856–1940)	Chef des Generalstabes der Armee	1908	1912
missing	Chef des Generalstabes der Armee	1912	1912
GM Konrad Krafft von Dellmensingen (1862–1953)	Chef des Generalstabes der Armee	1912	1914
