= Carl von Horn (1847–1923) =

Generaloberst (1847–1923)

Carl Graf von Horn (16 February 1847 – 5 June 1923) was a Bavarian Colonel General and War Minister from 4 April 1905 to 16 February 1912. He was born in Würzburg and died in Munich. Before he became minister, he was Lieutenant General and divisional commander in Regensburg, where the Hornstraße is named in honor of him.

== Notes ==
Government offices
Preceded by Adolph Freiherr von Asch zu Asch auf Oberndorff	Ministers of War (Bavaria); 1905–1912	Succeeded by Otto Freiherr Kreß von Kressenstein
