= 1st Royal Bavarian Heavy Cavalry (Prince Charles of Bavaria's) =

Military unit

The 1st Royal Bavarian Heavy Cavalry “Prince Charles of Bavaria” (Königlich Bayerisches Schwere-Reiter-Regiment „Prinz Karl von Bayern“ Nr. 1) were a heavy cavalry regiment of the Royal Bavarian Army. The regiment was formed in 1814 as Garde du Corps to the King of Bavaria. The normal peacetime location of the regiment was Munich. The regiment fought in the War of the Sixth Coalition, the Austro-Prussian War, the Franco-Prussian War and World War I. The regiment was disbanded in 1919.

== See also ==
- List of Imperial German cavalry regiments
