= Bayerisches Armeemuseum =

Military history museum in Munich, Germany

Coordinates: 48°45′53″N 11°25′53″E

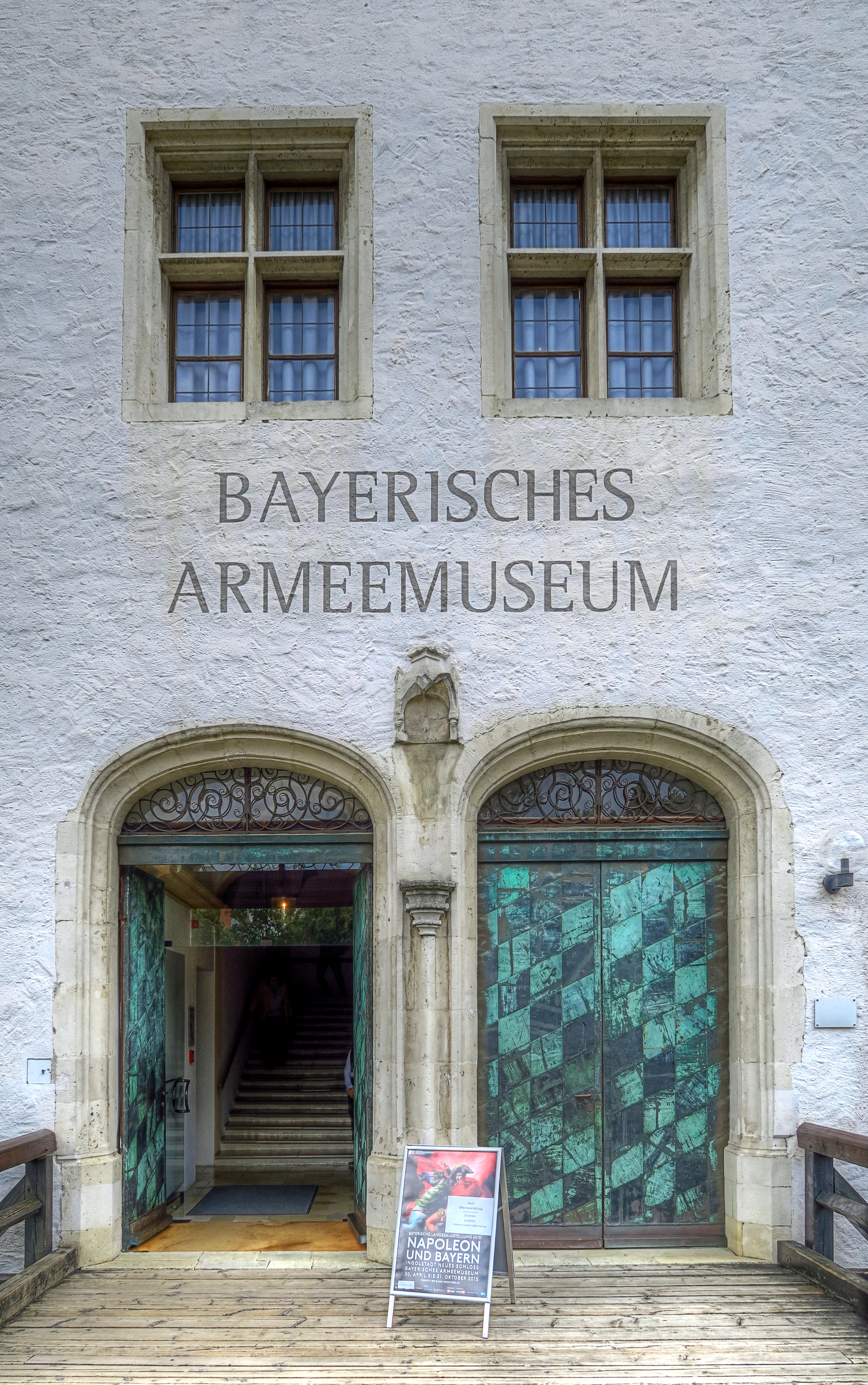
Main entrance of the Bayerisches Armeemuseum

The Bayerisches Armeemuseum is the Military History Museum of Bavaria. It was founded in 1879 in Munich and is located in Ingolstadt since 1972. The main collection is housed in the New Castle, the permanent exhibition about the First World War in Reduit Tilly opened in 1994 and the Armeemuseum incorporated the Bayerisches Polizeimuseum (Bavarian Police Museum) in the Turm Triva in 2012. Today, part of the former Munich Museum building is the central building of the new Bayerische Staatskanzlei (Bavarian State Chancellery).

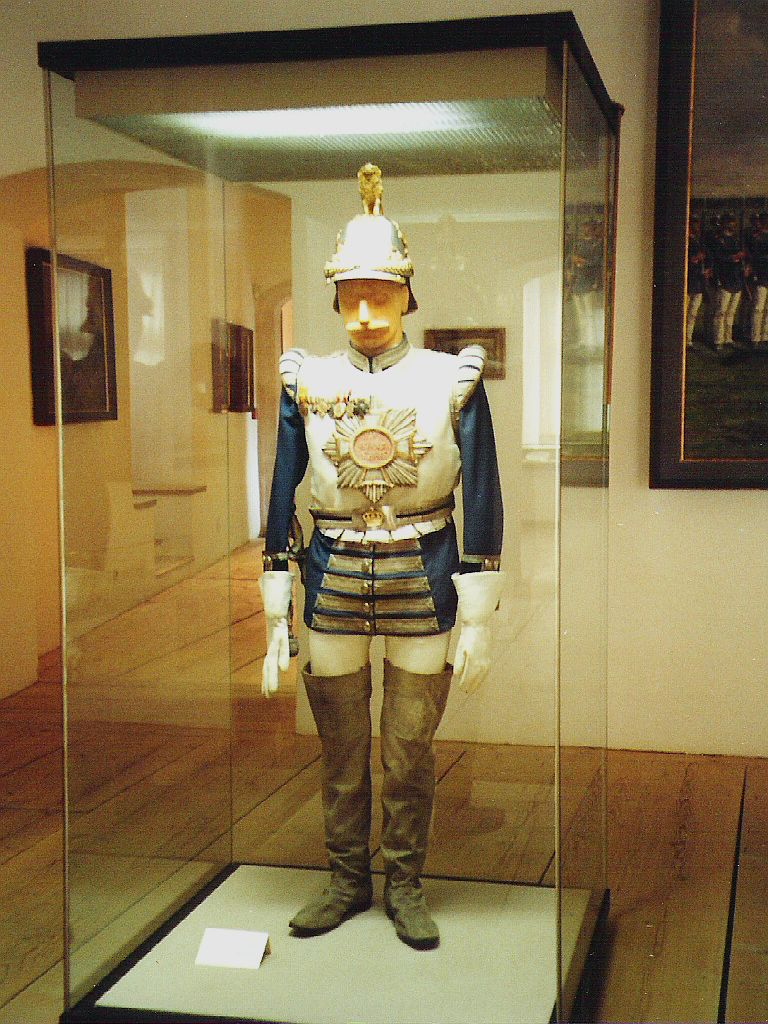
Uniform of a Hartschier (Bavarian court guard)

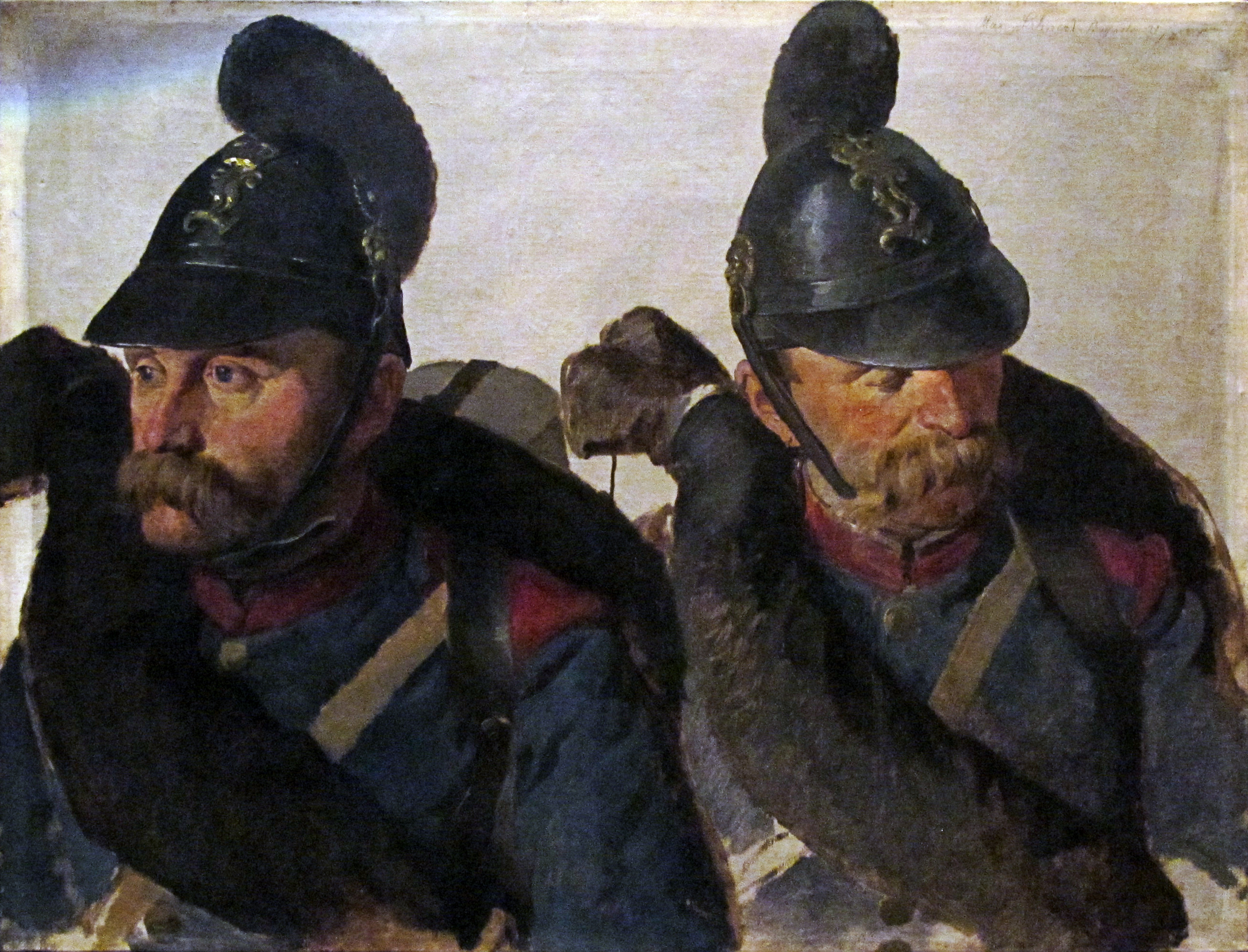
Bavarian Infantrymen around 1870 (painting by Louis Braun)

== History ==
=== Museum in Munich ===
The museum was founded in 1879 by King Ludwig II of Bavaria at the suggestion of General Friedrich von Bothmers and the Minister of War Joseph Maximilian von Maillinger. It was to bring together the collections that were scattered throughout Bavaria. First director was Josef Würdinger (1822–1889). Until 1905, it was located in Munich in the arsenal of the Bavarian army and then moved after five years of construction, into a new monumental building at the Hofgarten in Munich; where the Hofgartenkaserne (court garden barracks) had previously stood, and was based on the plans by Ludwig von Mellinger.

During the Second World War, the building was partially destroyed. The preserved dome of the old museum building in Munich is the central building of the newly established Bayerische Staatskanzlei (state chancellery) today. From 1946 to 1969, the Armeemuseum was housed in the Bavarian National Museum in Munich.

=== Museum in Ingolstadt ===
==== Director Peter Jaeckel (1972–1979) ====
The collection on military history arrived in the New Castle in Ingolstadt, in 1969. The city had been the seat of the Dukes of Bavaria-Ingolstadt and as a former Bavarian mainland fortress, possessed a rich military tradition and numerous references to the Bavarian army. In 1972 the museum was opened under the direction of director Peter Jaeckel. The permanent exhibition designed and furnished at that time remained unchanged until 2014.

==== Director Ernst Aichner (1979–2010) ====
In 1979, Ernst Aichner became museum director and expanded the museum's collections significantly. He paid particular attention to the First World War and the Bavarian military paintings, such as those by artists like Anton Hoffmann or Louis Braun. Even more from unknown artists, who have immortalized the events of Bavarian and European military history through their paintings, were collected by Aichner and represent an important asset of the museum today.

Other acquisitions, such as a raffle of 6,000 Nazi propaganda art works seized by the United States at the end of Second world War in 1986, were never processed, even though the United States had made it a condition for the sale that they be processed in a museum. Aichner sent about 700 of the war paintings to the Deutsches Historisches Museum (German Historical Museum) in Berlin and to the Bundeswehr Military History Museum (Military History Museum of the German Armed Forces) in Dresden. The processing of the remaining objects in Ingolstadt waited until he had set up the planned department for Second World War.

In the same year, they also set up a Starfighter in the museum court yard, to which other military historians noted that a reference of the exhibit on the history of the 1683 established and 1918/19 disbanded Bavarian army was difficult to recognize.

In 1988, the Bavarian state parliament decided that a museum education concept should be created for the museum.

In connection with the Bavarian State Garden Show in Ingolstadt in 1992, Aichner developed ambitious expansion plans for his museum. Therefore, in addition to the previous, not yet fully used headquarters in the New Castle, all historic military buildings on the southern bank of the Danube in Ingolstadt's old town were to be used for expansion. Making the Armeemuseum the third largest military history museum in Europe. Ingolstadt lawyers, doctors, teachers and artists feared for Ingolstadt's reputation as a cultural city and founded with the local SPD member of Parliament Manfred Schuhmann, the initiative "culture instead of cannon", the Ingolstadt-based car manufacturer Audi was also concerned about the image of its headquarters.

In March 1993, a tin soldier with SS attributes was offered for sale at the souvenir stall of the museum treasury, which led to investigations in the Armeemuseum for use of markings of unconstitutional organizations. Minister of Culture, Hans Zehetmair, said at a parliamentary questioning by the Alliance 90/The Greens Chairman, Manfred Fleischer, that he waits for the outcome of the investigation, but regardless of the decision, he believes that the exhibition of objects that had nothing to do with the history of the Bavarian Army and which were considered as "overzealous", were nothing of the such. An employee of Aichner received a fine on the matter, and the case against Aichner was discontinued by the prosecution.

While the 700,000 DM, which was collected by the circle of friends of the museum was being spent on new acquisitions, which were mostly stored in the extensive museum depots, the exhibition for the First World War opened only in the Summer of 1994, more than two years after the scheduled date all because of missing 20,000 DM for educational information boards. For this exhibition, the parliamentary decision on the museum educational concept was also implemented, whereas for the main exhibition only came into effect with the reorganization after the national exhibition of 2015. The Reduit Tilly has become one of the few special museums of the First World War in recent years, and not only because the war reality is made physically tangible there was it universally recognized. The 100th anniversary of the beginning of the war not only increased public interest, but also the lending of exhibits to other museums increased significantly.

In addition, in 2007, the police history collection of the Bavarian State Police from Bamberg was transferred to the Armeemuseum. It contains historical information about the Königlich Bayerisches Gendarmeriekorps (Bavarian Gendarmerie), the Bavarian police during the National Socialist era and, in general, the development of the municipal and city police as well as the state, water protection, border and riot police. Under the organizational roof of the Armeemuseum, the collection was opened as its own Bayerisches Polizeimuseum (Bavarian Police Museum) only after several years of delay, on 19 December 2011, with a concept developed under the new director, Ansgar Reiß. The police museum is housed in the Turm Triva in the immediate vicinity of the Reduit Tilly.

Aichner pursued his expansion plans until his retirement at the end of January 2010: His last major act was the opening of an exhibition on the history of the Deutsche Gebirgstruppe (German mountain troops) from 1915 to today, in which the foundation Deutsche Gebirgstruppe was founded. The controversial surrounding the group because of its relationship to war crimes of the German Wehrmacht Kameradenkreis (circle of comrades), became the basis for the contribution of all of the mountain troops exhibits and documents to the foundation. Under Aichner's successor, the museum critically took on a special exhibition on the beginnings of the German mountain troops (17 September 2014 to 27 September 2015). Further special exhibitions on this topic are in preparation.

==== Director Ansgar Reiß (since 2010) ====
On 1 February 2010, Ansgar Reiß took up the post as the new museum director. After an exhibition on African American US soldiers during the occupation, the traveling exhibition hosted the Memorial to the Murdered Jews of Europe on the theme of Nazi military justice in 2011.

It was followed by exhibitions on topics such as the Die Polizei im NS-Staat (police in the Nazi state), König Ludwig II, Militärischer Widerstand gegen Hitler und das NS-Regime (military resistance against Hitler and the Nazi regime), Fotografien aus dem Afghanistan Einsatz der Bundeswehr (photographs from the Afghanistan mission of the Bundeswehr) or Krankenpflege im Ersten Weltkrieg (nursing in the First World War).

In 2014, the museum put a focus on the commemoration of the 100 Jahre Erster Weltkrieg (100 years of First World War). A large number of special exhibitions, events and publications filled up this special year and brought the museum a large increase in visitors.

Today, the museum sees its task in the "critical and historically accurate reflection of military and military violence in history and its effects on man, society and the state". Through the publication of an annual report for the years 2010 to 2014, they stated that the museum and the public are accountable for themselves.

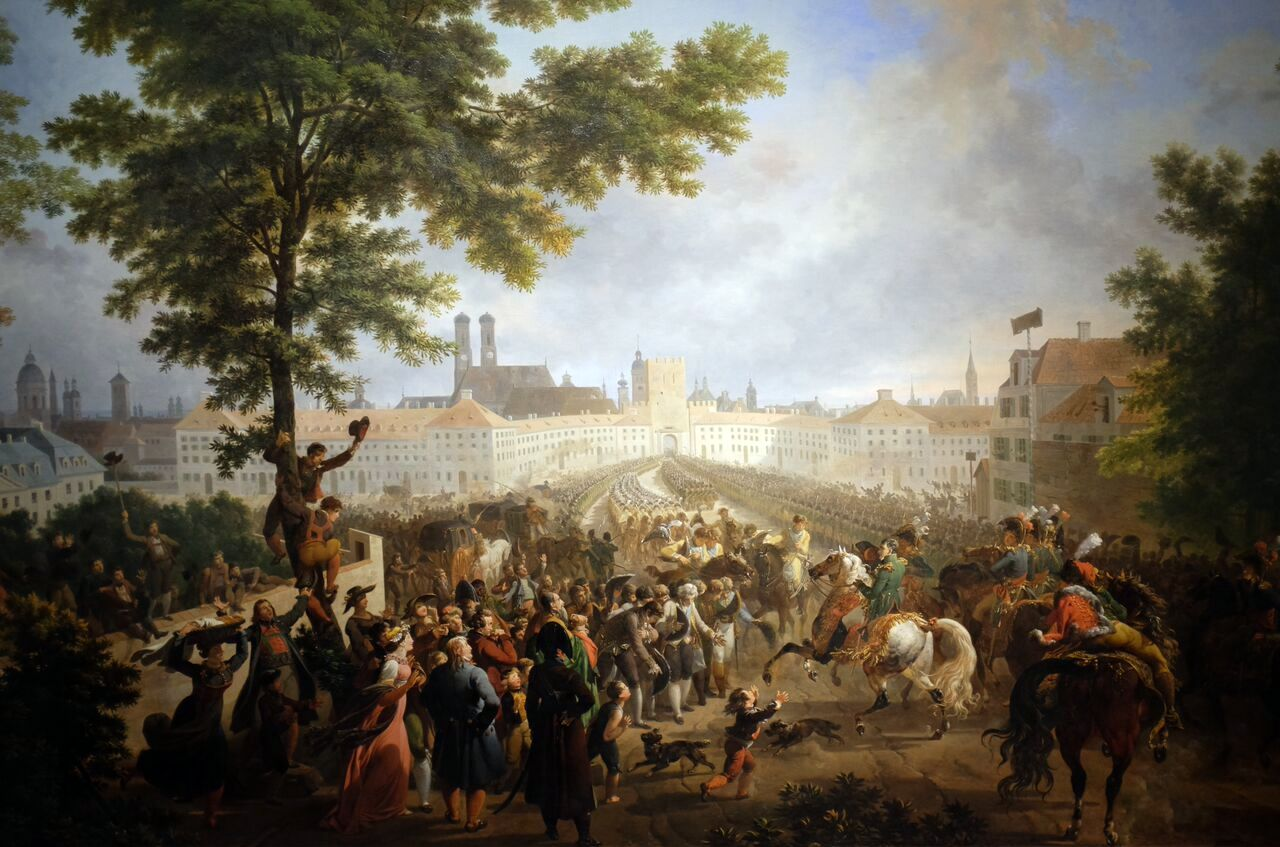
Napoleons arrival in Munich on 24 October 1805 by Nicolas-Antoine Taunay

From 30 April to 31 October 2015, the Bavarian State Exhibition Napoleon und Bayern took place in the New Castle, which was very successful with almost 150,000 visitors. For this exhibition, the previous permanent exhibition was removed, and the museum was renovated to become barrier-free. After the end of the national exhibition, the Armeemuseum will relocate gradually starting in 2018 to the same premises with a newly designed exhibition. Through which, objects are to be placed on display that have hardly or never before been presented in an exhibition at the Armeemuseum. A modern concept should better explain the exhibits to the visitor and place them in a clearer historical context than what was previously the case.

A first step towards the renewal of the permanent exhibition is the special exhibition Nord gegen Süd. Der Deutsche Krieg 1866 (North vs. South. The German War 1866) exhibition, which was opened in July 2016. It represents, for the first time, the comprehensive holdings of the museum on this topic and is accompanied with an extensive catalog of collections.

At the end of 2017, the museum presented a collection catalog on the museums old collection, which has received much attention by specialists in the field, with the volume "The Bavarian Army Museum: A Selection of Baroque and Renaissance Arms and Armor."

== Facilities and events ==
=== Permanent exhibitions ===
The museum today consists of three houses:

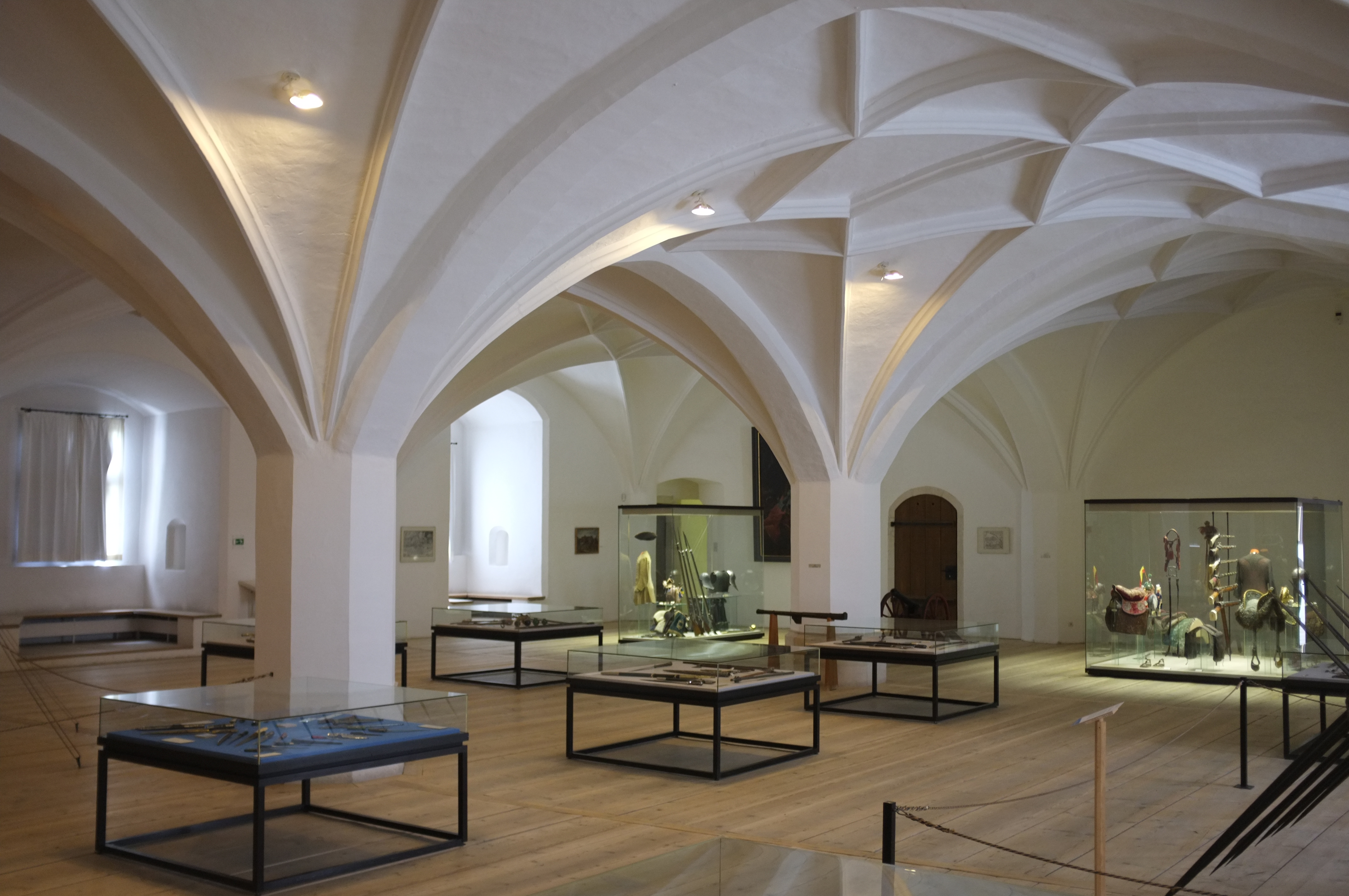
Exhibition room of the Bavarian Army Museum in the New Castle

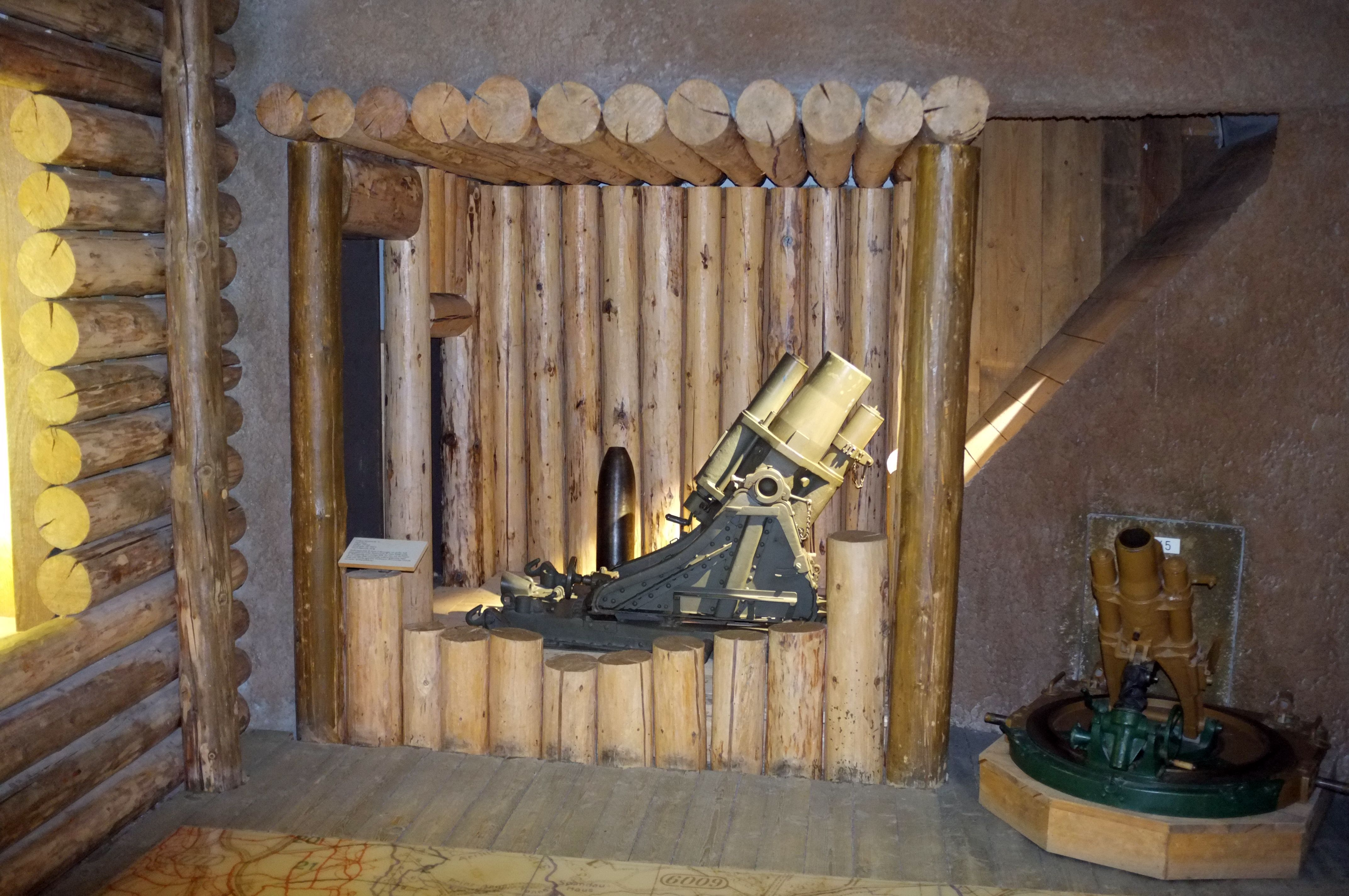
Replica of a position in the First World War in the Reduit Tilly

- The main building in the New Castle housed in its permanent exhibition an extensive collection of weapons, equipment, uniforms, flags, standards, paintings and medals with a focus on the Bavarian Army. In addition to exotic loot from the Bavarian involvement in the Turkish wars under Elector Max Emanuel, were also personal items from soldiers such as artworks or records from wartime and military service on display. The permanent exhibition, which will be under reconstruction after the end of the 2015 National Exhibition, will focus on the history of war, mercenaries, soldiers and military from the 14th to the beginning of the 20th century. To which, well-known pieces such as the Pappenheimer Harnisch (Plate armour), the 17th-century turf or uniforms of Bavarian kings will once again be on display, but with new content added.
- The Reduit Tilly is home to the Museum des Ersten Weltkriegs (Museum of the First World War), one of the largest permanent exhibitions of the First World War in Europe. The house displays, next to its permanent exhibition with 1500 m^{2} upstairs, several special exhibitions on the ground floor of the fortification, which deal with the theme of First World War.
- The Turm Triva is home to the Bayerische Polizeimuseum, which is a section of the Armeemuseum but is referred to as a museum because of its theme. Here, visitors can find an overview of the history of the Bavarian police, from the turmoil of the 1918–19 revolution to the battles for the Wackersdorf reprocessing plant in Wackersdorf, on more than 600 m^{2}.

In addition, the museum keeps an extensive collection of paintings, graphics, musical instruments, vehicles, models, toys, pewter figures, photo albums, diaries, archives and much more in its depots, which are also provided for scientific research.

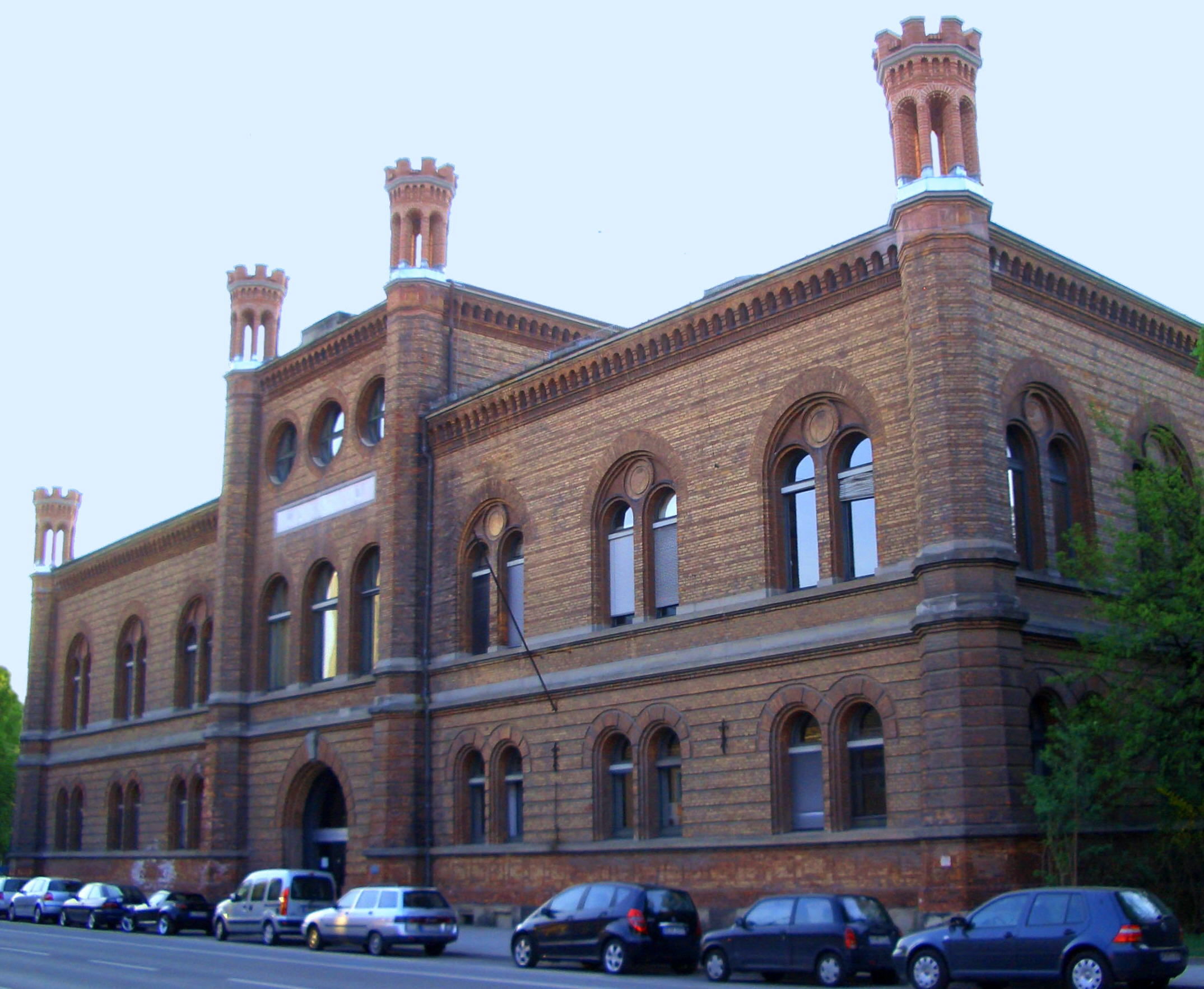
Zeughaus München (Museum seat 1879 to 1905)

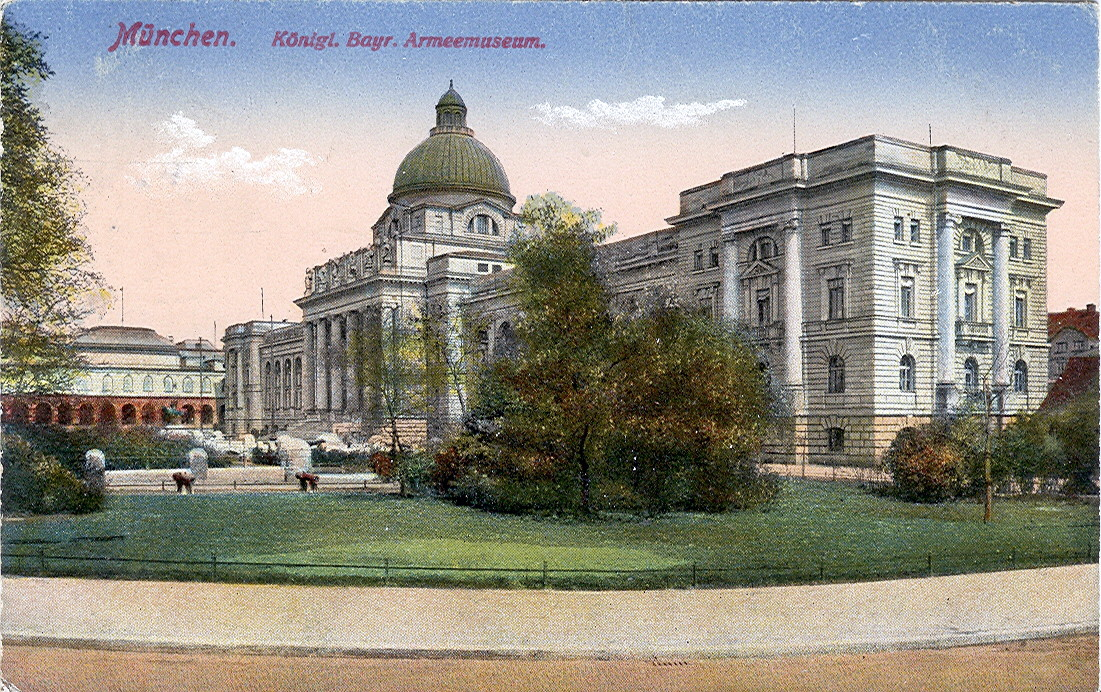
Münchner Armeemuseum (1905 bis 1945)

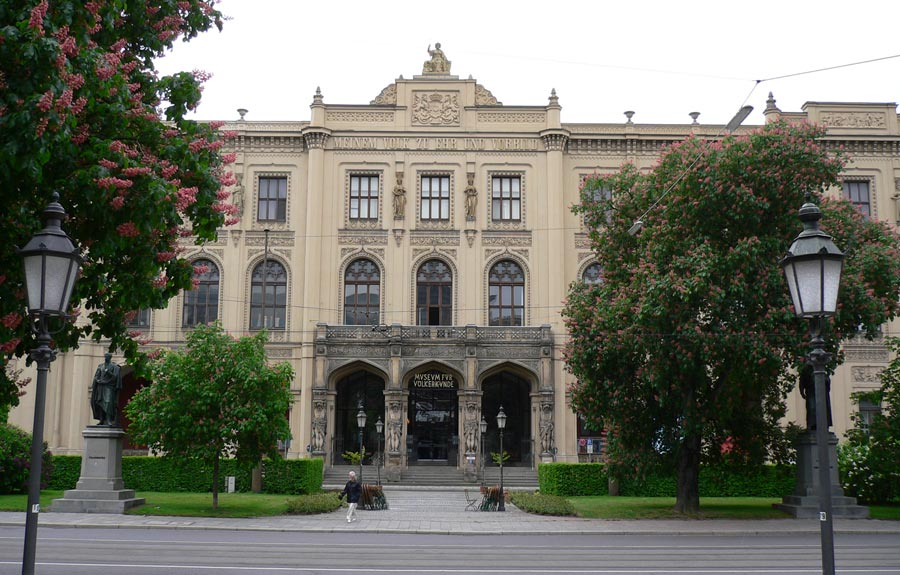
Staatliches Museum für Völkerkunde, Home of the Armeemuseum from 1946 to 1969

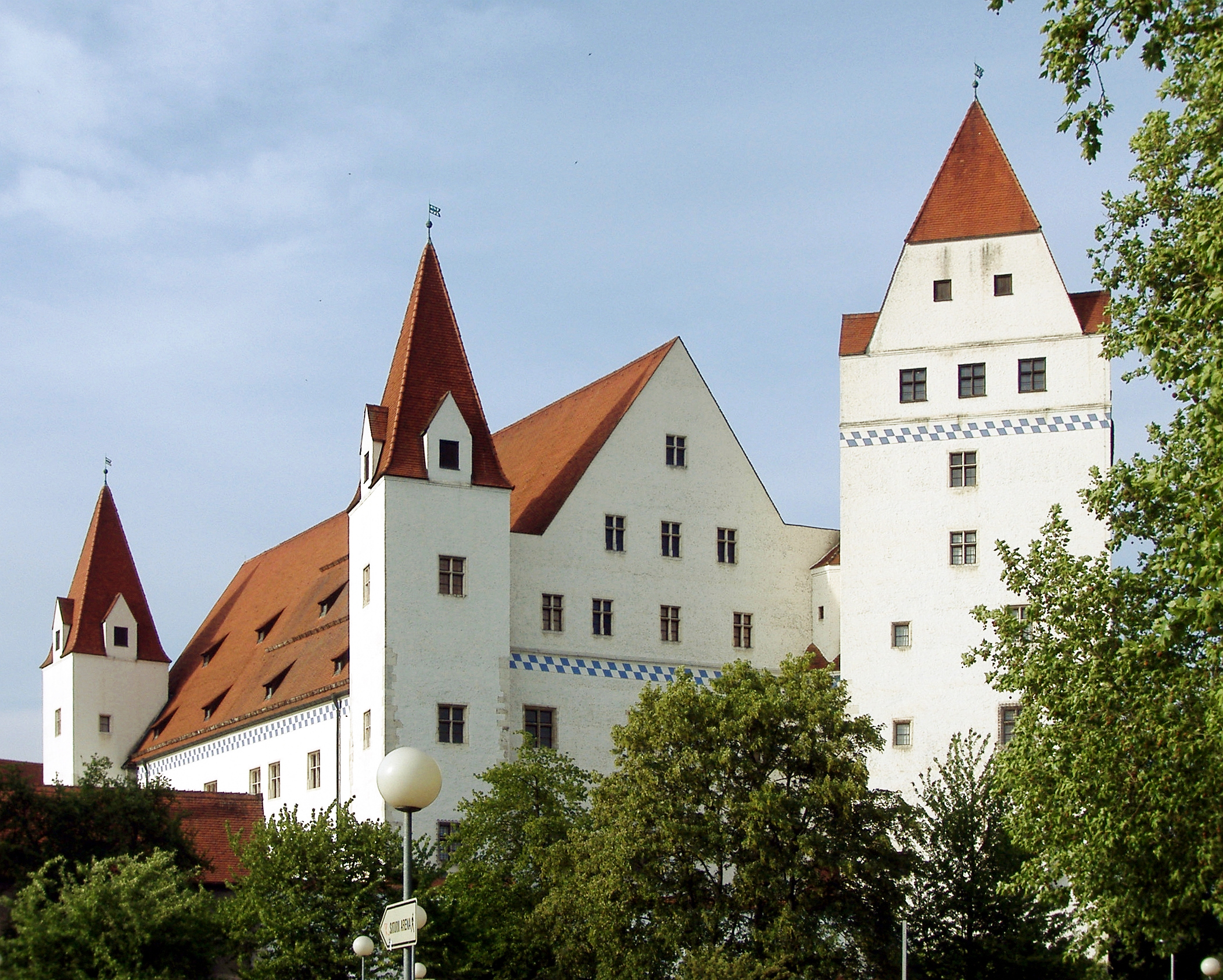
New Castle in Ingolstadt, Since 1972 Seat of the Armeemuseum

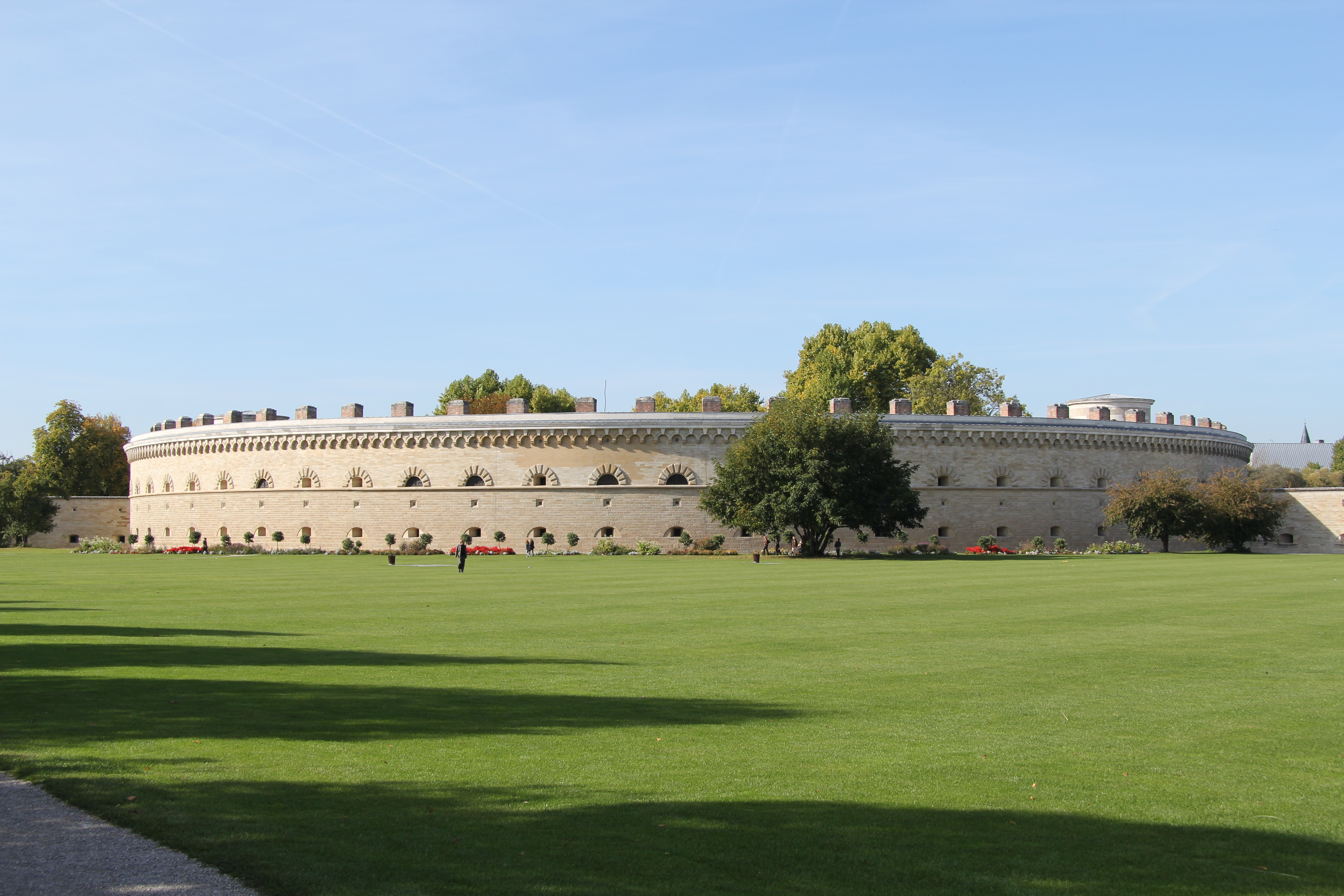
Reduit Tilly with the 1994 permanent exhibition on the First World War

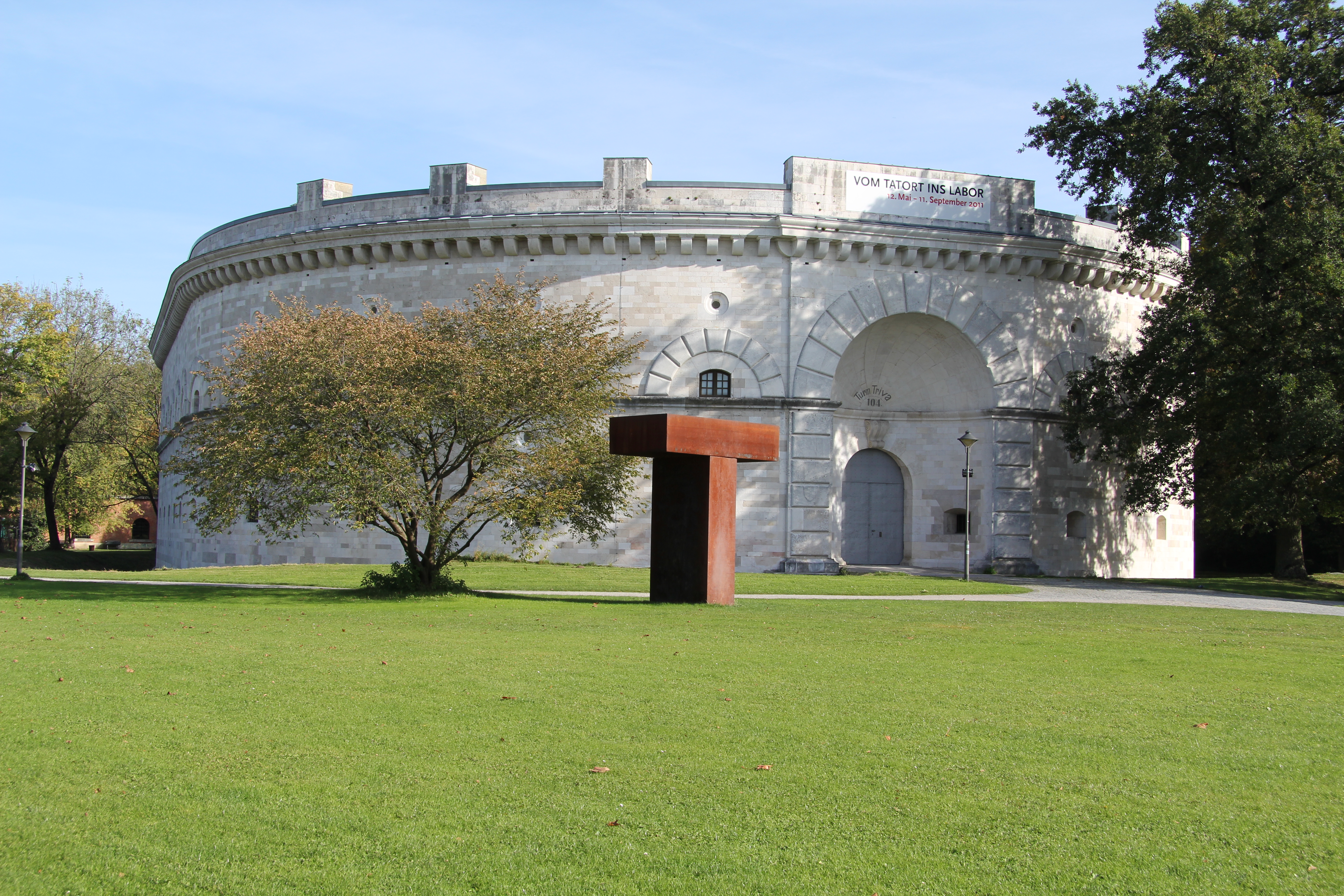
Turm Triva with the Bayerisches Polizeimuseum, which has been integrated into the Armeemuseum since 2012

=== Bavarian Army Library ===
The holdings of the, 1822 as main conservatory of the Army in Munich built Bayerische Armeebibliothek (Bavarian army library), were seized at the end of the Second World War, largely by the US Armed Forces and returned in 1962. Until 1984/85, they were administered by the Bundeswehr, then the Bayerische Armeebibliothek was re-established as part of the Armeemuseum and moved into rooms in the former army bakery in the city center of Ingolstadt.

=== Special exhibitions ===
Selection from 2010:

- 2010: Auf Sand gebaut – Der Atlantikwall (Built on Sand – The Atlantic Wall)
- 2010: Andenken an die Militärzeit (Memory of the military time)
- 2011: Der Kampf um die Bürgerrechte. Afroamerikanische GIs und Deutschland (The fight for civil rights. African American GIs and Germany)
- 2011: Vom Tatort ins Labor. Rechtsmediziner decken auf (From the crime scene to the lab. Forensic doctors reveal)
- 2011: "Was damals Recht war ..." Soldaten und Zivilisten vor Gerichten der Wehrmacht ("What was right then ..." Soldiers and civilians in the courts of the Wehrmacht)
- 2011: Die etwas andere Schule. Fotoausstellung der Pionierschule und Fachschule des Heeres für Bautechnik (The slightly different school. Photo exhibition of the pioneer school and technical school of the army for construction engineering)
- 2012: Ordnung und Vernichtung. Die Polizei im NS-Staat (Order and annihilation. The police in the Nazi state)
- 2012: Schein und Sein. Holzskulpturen von Andreas Kuhnlein (appearance and being. Wooden sculptures by Andreas Kuhnlein)
- 2012: Götterdämmerung. König Ludwig II. (God's dusk. King Ludwig II)
- 2012: "Frohe Weihnacht'!" Weihnachtskarten aus dem Ersten und Zweiten Weltkrieg ("Merry Christmas!" Christmas cards from the First and Second World War)
- 2013: Aufstand des Gewissens. Militärischer Widerstand gegen Hitler und das NS-Regime 1933–1945 (Riot of conscience. Military resistance against Hitler and the Nazi regime)
- 2013: Jo Röttger. Landscapes & Memory
- 2013: Wanted. "Steckbrief, Fahndungsplakat, Phantomzeichnung" von der Antike bis zum Beginn des Digitalen Zeitalters ("Biographies, wanted posters, phantom drawings" from antiquity to the beginning of the digital age)
- 2013: Apokalyptik als Widerstand (Apocalyptic as resistance. Tom Biber Collection)
- 2014: Who cares. Geschichte und Alltag der Krankenpflege (Who cares. History and everyday life of nurses)
- 2014: "Ihr könnt Euch keine Vorstellung von diesem Schrecken machen und niemand, der's nicht mitgemacht." ("You cannot imagine doing this horror and nobody, who does not do it" (Field letters of an infantryman)
- 2014: "Dieser Stellungs- und Festungskrieg ist fürchterlich". Kriegsbeginn 1914 ("This position and fortress war is terrible". War began in 1914)
- 2014: Im Maschinenraum des Krieges. Ingolstadt 1914–1918 (In the engine room of the war. Ingolstadt 1914–1918)
- 2014: Die Alpen im Krieg – Krieg in den Alpen. Die Anfänge der deutschen Gebirgstruppe 1915 (The Alps at war – war in the Alps. The beginnings of the German mountain troop 1915
- 2015: Der Große Krieg im Kleinformat. Graphik- und Medaillenkunst zum Ersten Weltkrieg (The Great War in small format. Graphic and medal art from the First World War)
- 2015: European Tribal Wars
- 2015: Bayerische Landesausstellung "Napoleon und Bayern" (Bavarian State Exhibition "Napoleon and Bavaria")
- 2016: Nord gegen Süd. Der Deutsche Krieg 1866 (north to south. The German War in 1866)
- 2016: Mythos Hinterkaifeck. Auf den Spuren eines Verbrechens (Myth Hinterkaifeck. In the footsteps of a crime)
- 2016: André Butzer: ...und sah den Frieden des Himmels" (André Butzer: ... and saw the peace of the sky")
- 2017: Verheizt – vergöttert – verführt. Die deutsche Gebirgstruppe 1915 bis 1939 (Heated – deified – seduced. The German Mountain Troops 1915 to 1939)
- 2018: Im Visier des Fotografen. Alte Waffen in neuem Licht (In the photographer's sights. Old weapons in a new light.)

== Scientific staff ==
Researchers of the museum are:

- Ansgar Reiß, Museum director
- Dieter Storz, main conservator
- Tobias Schönauer, conservator
- Daniel Hohrath, curator (Army Library)
- Frank Wernitz, curator

In the 1970s, Rotraud Werde was a designated expert on uniforms at the museum. From 1979 to 2011, Jürgen Kraus was curator and main conservator at the museum.

== Friendship circle ==
The fortunes of the museum have been accompanied for decades by the Verein der Freunde des Bayerischen Armeemuseums (Association of Friends of the Bavarian Armeemuseum) based in Munich. In addition to various representatives of Bavarian aristocracy and officer corps, counted in 1967, museum director Ernst Aichner was also a student among the founding members. Chairman, from 1989 to 2016, was the former CSU member of parliament and long-time head of external relations of Eurocopter, Manfred Dumann. After the Bavarian Ministry of Science, which has been under FDP leadership since 2009, chose a successor without Aichner friendship circle, leading members of the friendship such as Ingolstadt's Second Mayor Albert Wittmann (CSU) were initially irritated and did not want to rule out an FDP plot against Horst Seehofer. After the contact between Dumann and the new museum director had normalized, the special exhibition on the Nazi military justice and its victims caused a low point of the relationship. Relying on his status as the son of a fallen Wehrmacht soldier, Dumann criticized a "blanket defamation" of lawyers and "bias" on the part of exhibition organizers, prompting Reiß to conclude that the museum was "not a sanatorium for offended Wehrmacht souls". By changing the articles of association, the foundations of further cooperation between the museum and the circle of friends were redefined and the responsibilities clearly defined. A new board of trustees was appointed for the association under the direction of Prince Wolfgang von Bayern.

In August 2016, Dumann resigned from the chair due to his age. The new chairman was Ernst Aichner, former director of the Armeemuseum. The board includes, among others, mayor Albert Wittmann and the deputies Robert Brannekämper and Reinhard Brandl (each CSU).

On 7 October 2017, an article was published in the Donaukurier referring to revisionist and legal texts on the website of the Association of Friends. Museum director Reiß pointed out on demand by the newspaper that he had already informed Aichner by letter in July on this "obvious maladministration" and asked the association to delete the texts. When this did not happen, the museum director "publicly distanced himself from the association" and criticized "the publication of these" right-wing texts "violently". All links to the association have been removed from the museums homepage. Aichner stated that he had instructed the administrator of the association website after the notice by Reiß, that the texts which incidentally had not been approved by him, to be remove from the internet. He then assumed that the matter had been settled. In fact, only the links to the texts had been removed, but direct access was still possible. According to Aichner, the administrator has since been deprived of access to the association's website.

== Literature ==
- Hinz, Hans-Martin; Deutsches Historisches Museum (1997). Der Krieg und seine Museen (in German). Frankfurt: Campus. ISBN 3-593-35838-7. OCLC 39218635.
- Bayerisches Armeemuseum (2017). A selection of Medieval, Renaissance and Baroque arms and armour. Milano. ISBN 978-88-95191-04-1. OCLC 1018312831.
- Storz, Dieter (2014). Der Große Krieg 100 Objekte aus dem Bayerischen Armeemuseum (in German). Essen. ISBN 978-3-8375-1174-1. OCLC 880712320.
- Bayerisches Armeemuseum; Storz, Dieter; Hohrath, Daniel; Reiß, Ansgar; Schönauer, Tobias; Wernitz, Frank (2016). Nord gegen Süd : Der Deutsche Krieg 1866 (in German). Ingolstadt. ISBN 978-3-00-053589-5. OCLC 954130645.
