= Bayerische Staatskanzlei =

Bavarian state agency

Coordinates: 48°08′32″N 11°34′58″E

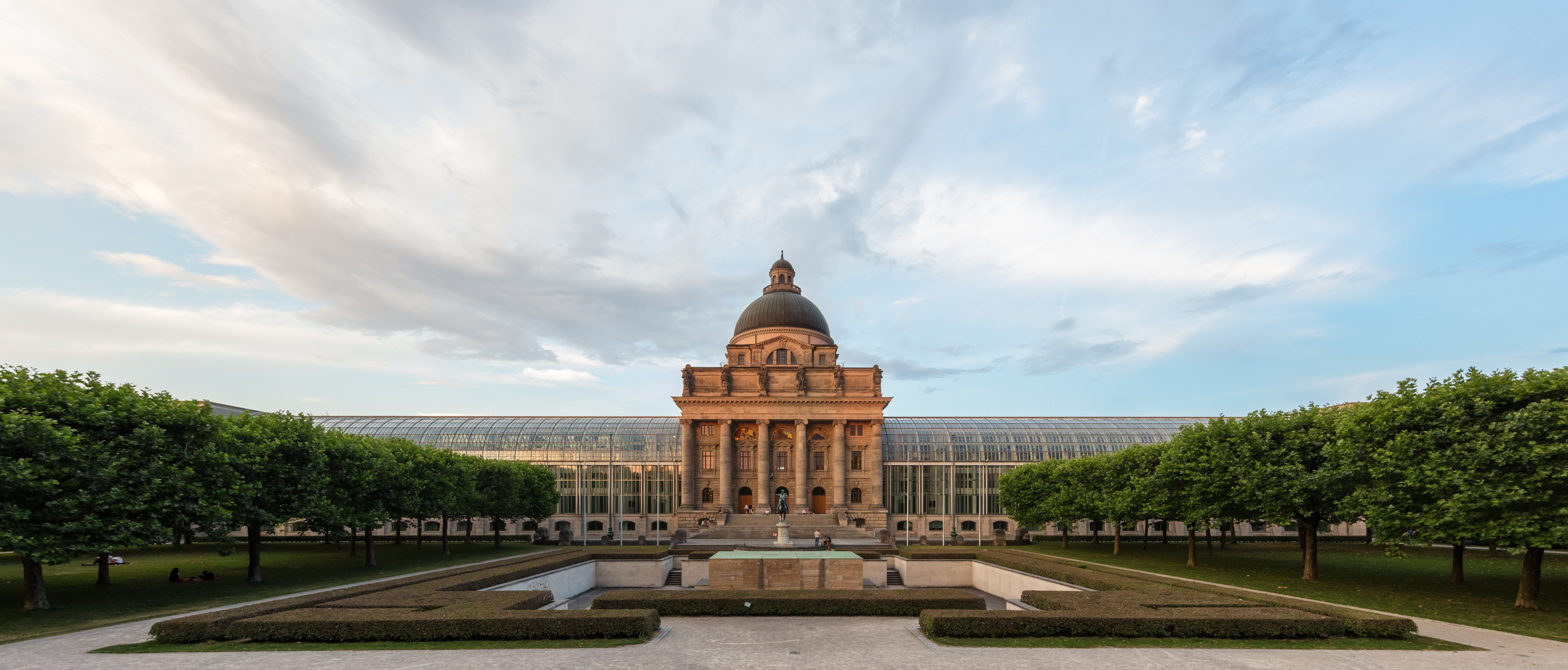
Whole building

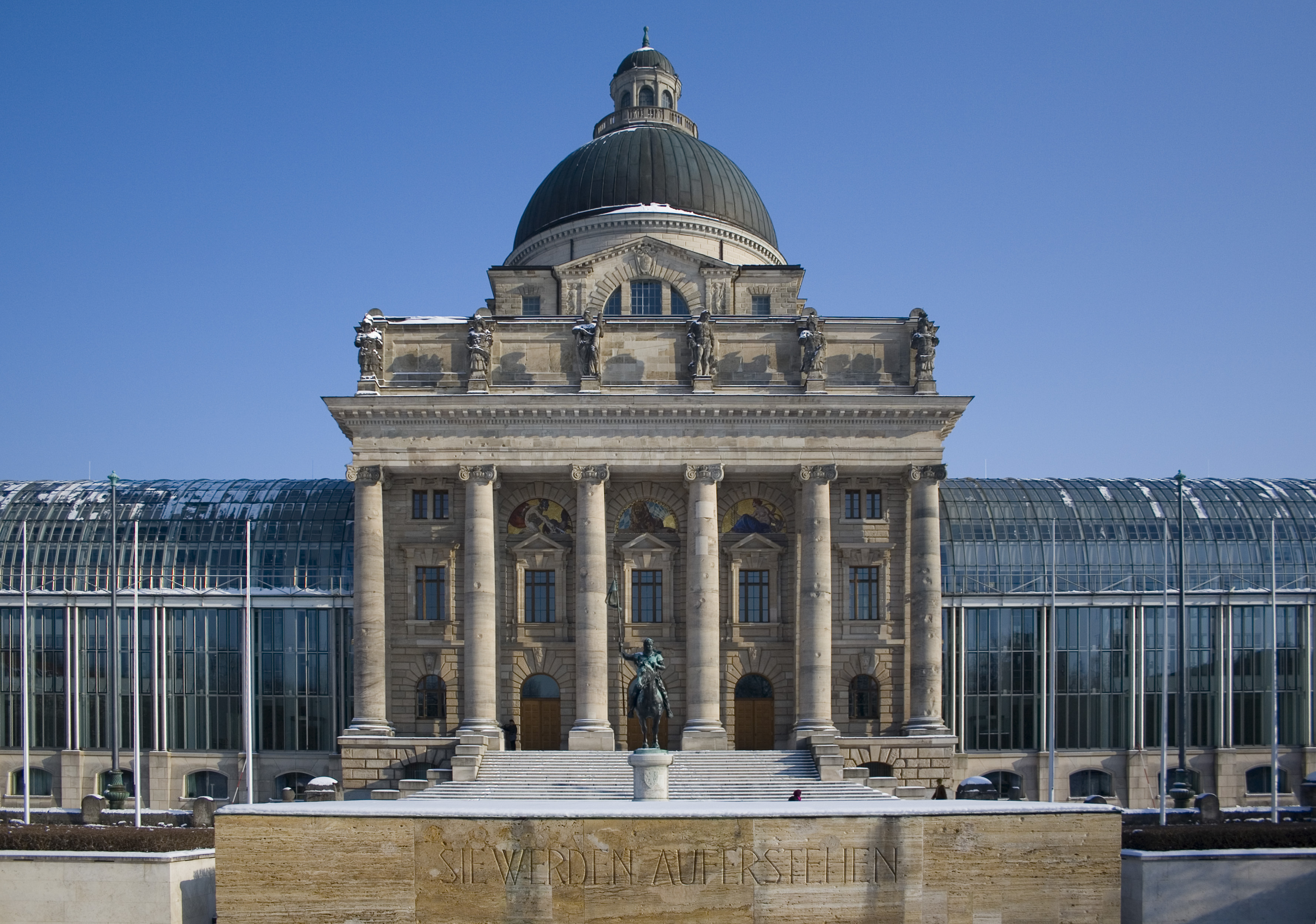
Frontal view of the building

Bayerische Staatskanzlei (Bavarian State Chancellery) is the name of a state agency of the German Free State of Bavaria and also of the appendant building.

== The office ==
The Bavarian State Chancellery serves as the executive office of the Minister-President as head of government. The agency's primary function is to assist the Minister-President in coordinating the activities of the Bavarian State Government, similar to the German Chancellery on federal level. The State Chancellery is represented by Bavarian missions in the German capital Berlin and to the European Union in Brussels.

== The building ==
Bayerische Staatskanzlei is also the name of the building in Munich that houses the personal offices of the chancellery staff. It was erected from 1989 to 1993 around the central dome of the former Bavarian Army Museum, which had been built in 1905 at the site of the Hofgartenkaserne barracks and was made derelict in World War II. The museum then was moved to the New Castle in Ingolstadt.

With reference to Leo von Klenze's neighbouring Festsaalbau of the Munich Residenz, the new building of the Bavarian Army Museum was also influenced by the Italian High Renaissance architecture, but shows the monumentalization of the late Historicism. The architect was Ludwig Mellinger. The west side of the central building with six columns completes a three-part entablature with limestone figures in the center and four trophies. The east facade, originally facing no road, was made comparatively restrained. Under the dome was a central room, a "Hall of Fame". This space takes the two upper floors with a height of 32 meters. After its destruction in World War II, the two side wings were torn off, the central building was for a ruin for decades. By 1982, however, the 52-meter-high (171 ft) dome with its copper coverage was restored.

The remnants of some Renaissance arcades of the Hofgarten in the north were integrated to the building. The two new wings are covered in full length with glazed stairs in the style of Jacob's Ladders, giving the impression of ship stairs. At the request of then-Prime Minister Max Streibl an intimate space with wood paneling and furnishings ("Zirbelstube") was inserted after the reception room of the Prime Minister, who caused a stir because of high costs. The building comprises about 8,800 m^{2}. To the east of the building the stream Köglmühlbach flows past above ground. Before the west side of the courtyard is the war memorial and the equestrian statue of Duke Otto I Wittelsbach.

== See also ==
- Prinz-Carl-Palais
