= Kreuztor (Ingolstadt) =

Coordinates: 48.764177°N 11.417917°E

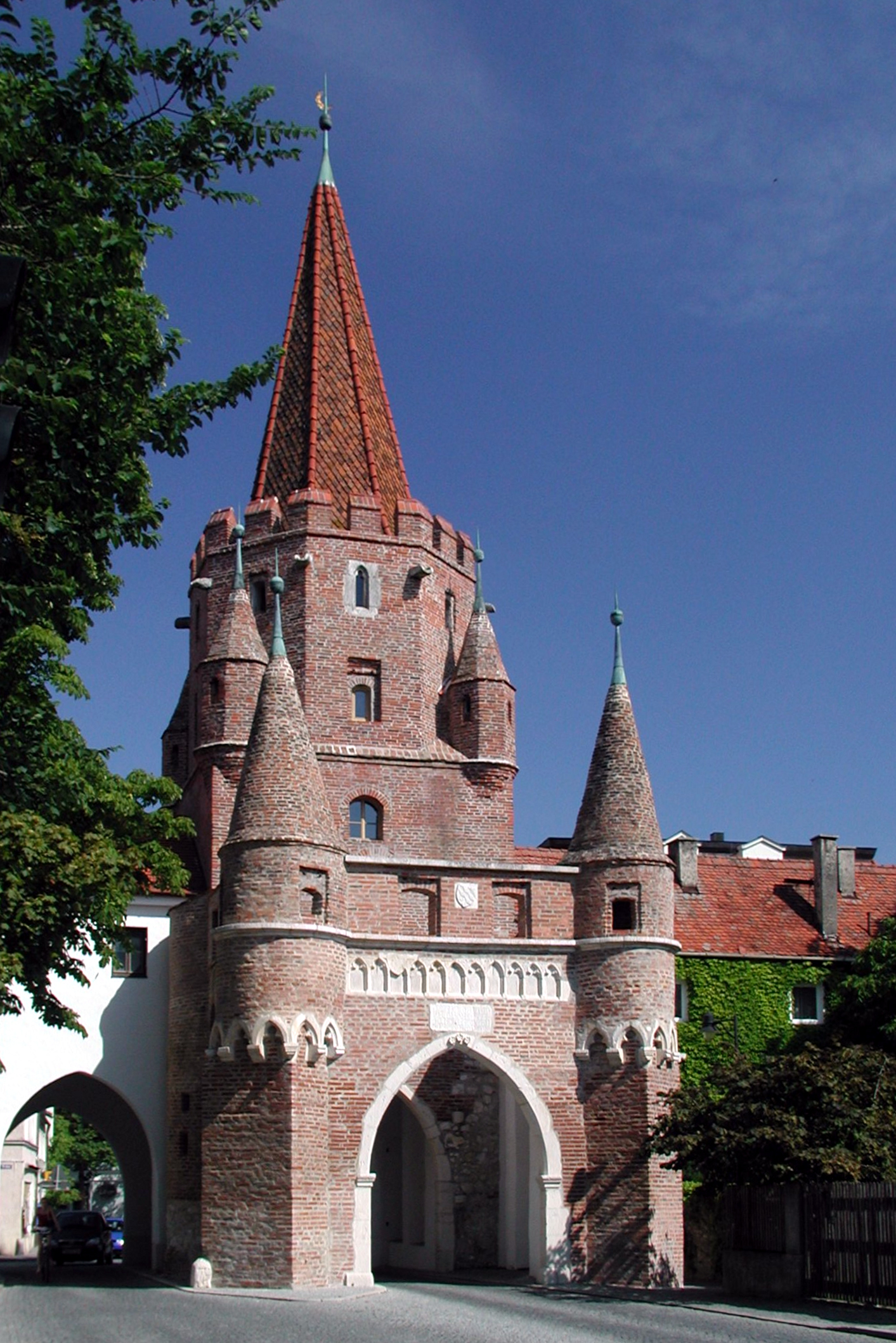
Kreuztor in 2004

The Kreuztor, built in 1385, is the western gateway to the medieval city center of Ingolstadt. The tower's name is derived from the leper house belonging to the Church of the Holy Cross (Kirche zum heiligen Kreuz), which stood to the west of the city walls until its destruction in the Schmalkaldic War in 1546.

This seven-turreted guard tower was part of Ingolstadt's second city wall. Of the city's four principal gates (the Feldkirchnertor, Hardertor, Kreuztor and Donautor), only this and the Feldkirchnertor survive today, the latter as part of the castle complex.
