= Sandrach =

River in Germany

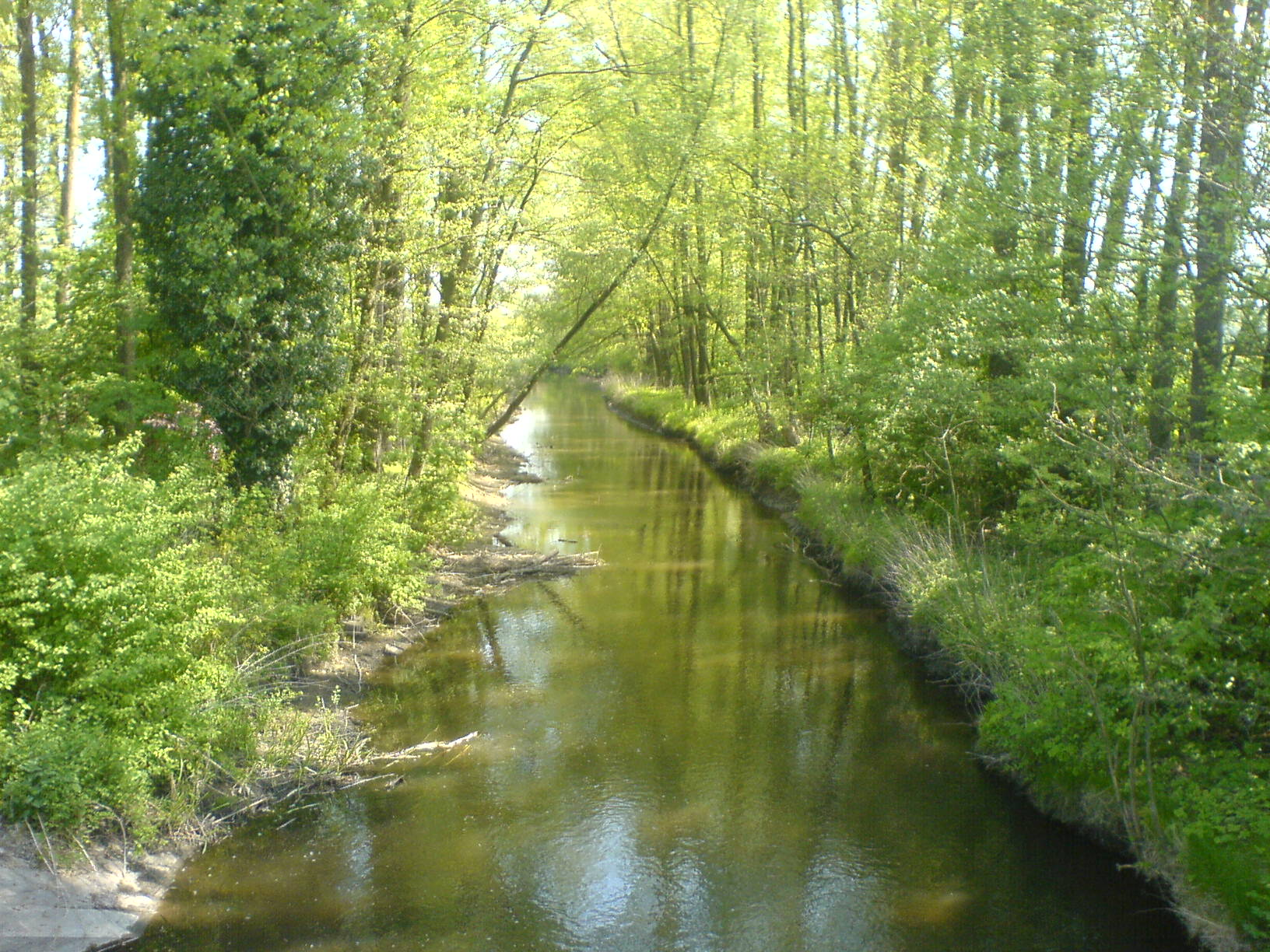
- The Sandrach east of Ingolstadt's district Unsernherrn

Location
- Country: Germany
- State: Bavaria

Physical characteristics
- Mouth
  - location: Paar
  - coordinates: 48.7253°N 11.4992°E
- Length: 50.6 km (31.4 mi)
- Basin size: 353 km^{2} (136 sq mi)

Basin features
- Progression: Paar→ Danube→ Black Sea

Sandrach is a 51 km long river of Bavaria, Germany. It flows into the Paar near Manching.

== See also ==
- List of rivers of Bavaria
