= Bavarian Police Museum =

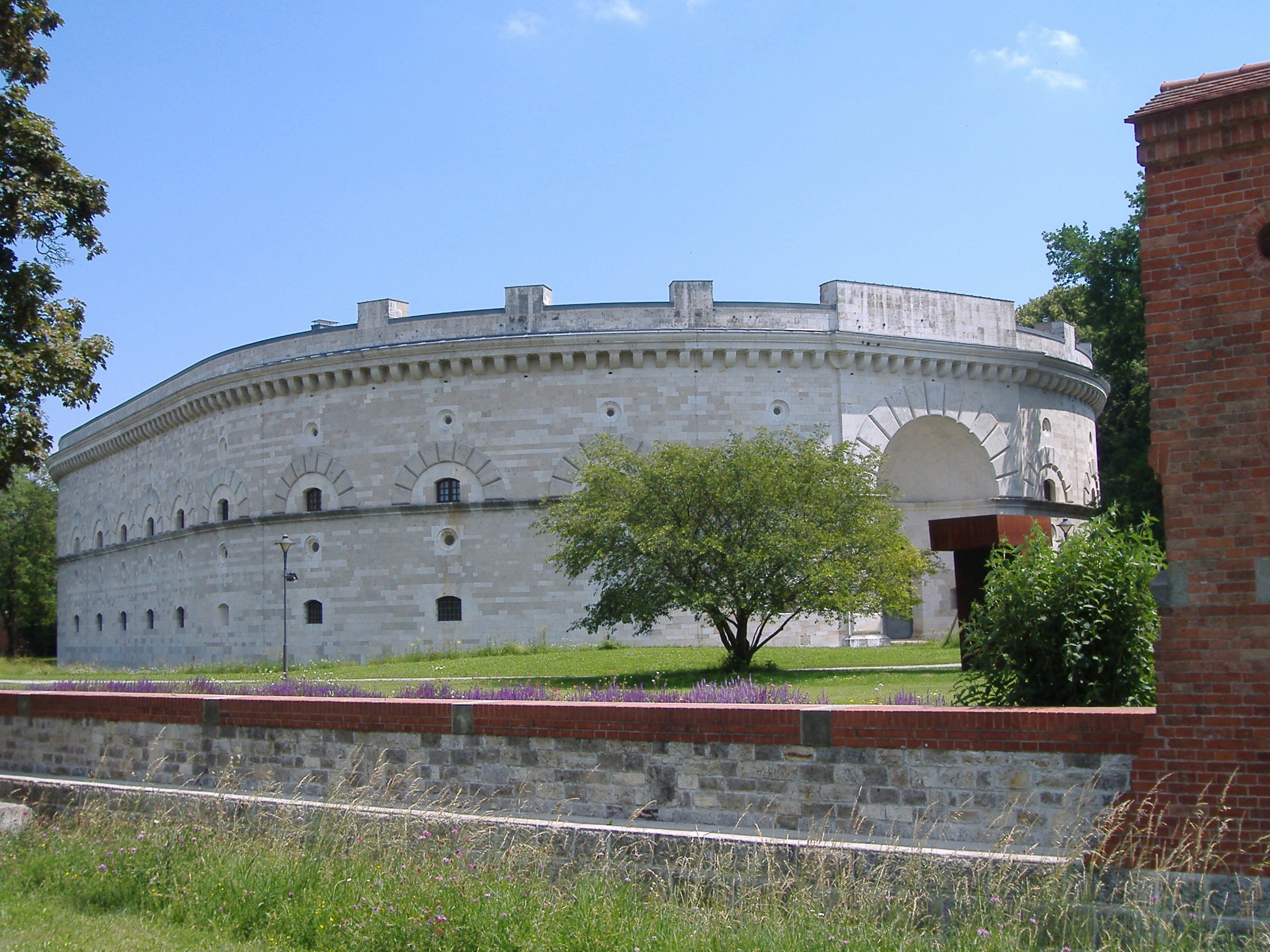
- The Turm Triva

- Location within Germany
- Established: 2011
- Location: Ingolstadt, Germany
- Coordinates: 48°45′45″N 11°26′07″E

The Bavarian Police Museum (Bayerische Polizeimuseum) is the central museum of the Bavarian State Police, housed in the historic Turm Triva in the Klenzepark in Ingolstadt. It opened on 19 December 2011. It includes a variety of exhibits dating from 1918 onwards and explains the history, organisation and development of policing in Bavaria since the 1918–19 Bavarian Revolution. Previously owned by the Police itself, in 2007 the collection became a department of the Bavarian Army Museum.

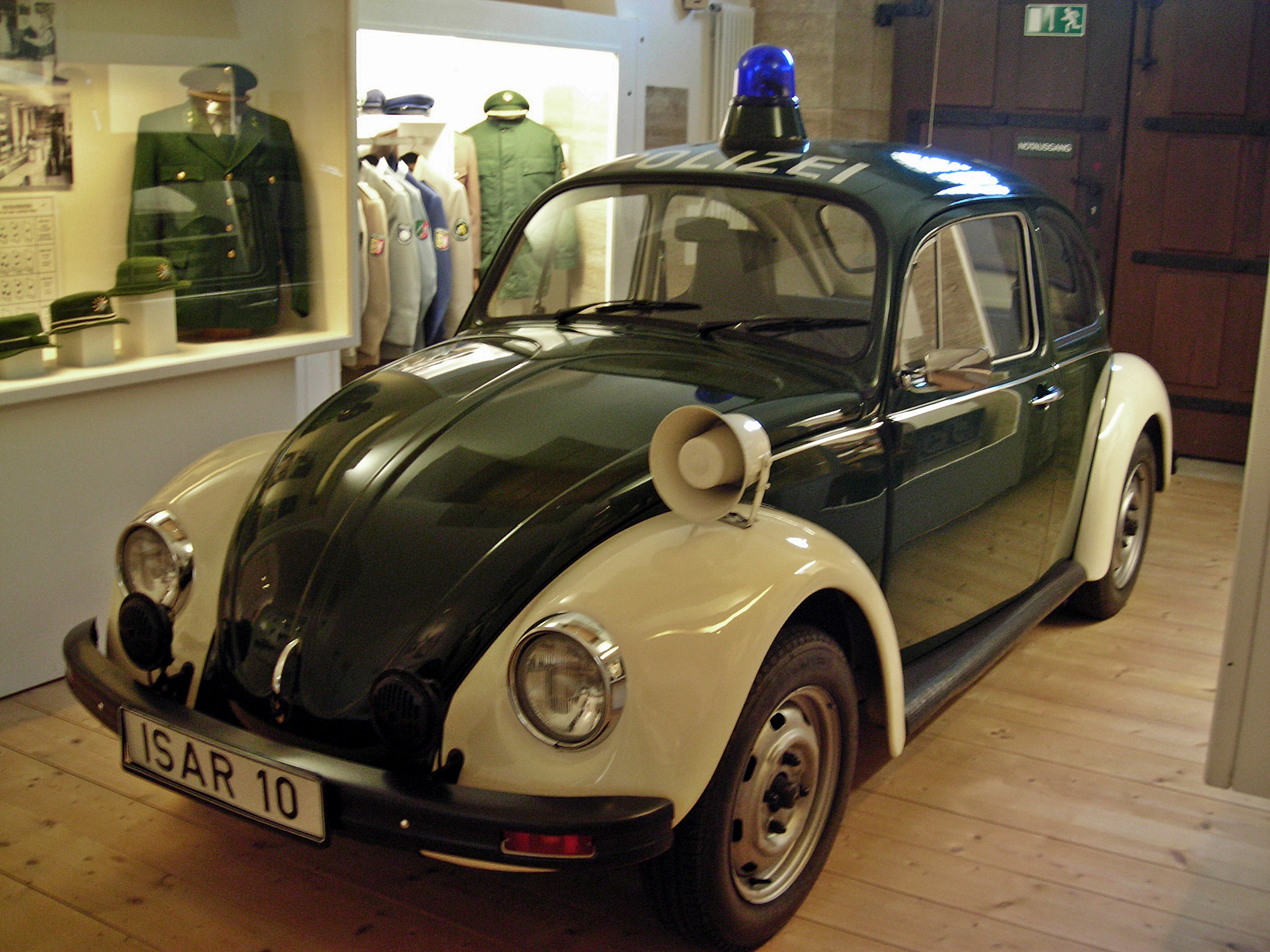
VW Käfer as a police car
