= Ingolstadt =

- City
- Flag Coat of arms
- Interactive map of Ingolstadt
- Location within Germany Location within Bavaria
- Coordinates: 48°45′47″N 11°25′30″E
- Country: Germany
- State: Bavaria
- Admin. region: Oberbayern
- District: Urban district
- Subdivisions: 11 Stadtbezirke with 61 Unterbezirken

Government
  - Mayor (2025–2032): Michael Kern (CSU)

Area
  - Total: 133.37 km^{2} (51.49 sq mi)
- Elevation: 374 m (1,227 ft)

Population (2025-12-31)
  - Total: 140,799
  - Density: 1,055.7/km^{2} (2,734.3/sq mi)
- Time zone: UTC+01:00 (CET)
  - Summer (DST): UTC+02:00 (CEST)
- Postal codes: 85049–85057
- Dialling codes: 0841; 08450 (Zuchering, Brunnenreuth); 08424 (Irgertsheim); 08458 (Pettenhofen/Mühlhausen/Dünzlau); 08459 (Niederfeld)
- Vehicle registration: IN
- Website: www.ingolstadt.de

Ingolstadt (German: [ˈɪŋɡɔlˌʃtat]; Austro-Bavarian: [ˈɪŋl̩ʃtɔːd]) is an independent city (Note: Called a Kreisfreie Stadt in German) on the Danube, in Upper Bavaria, Germany, with 142,308 inhabitants (as of 31 December 2023). Around half a million people live in the metropolitan area. Ingolstadt is the second largest city in Upper Bavaria after Munich and the fifth largest city in Bavaria after Munich, Nuremberg, Augsburg and Regensburg. The city passed the mark of 100,000 inhabitants in 1989 and has since been one of the major cities in Germany. After Regensburg, Ingolstadt is the second largest German city on the Danube.

The city was first mentioned in 806. In the late Middle Ages, the city was one of the capitals of the Bavarian duchies alongside Munich, Landshut and Straubing, which is reflected in the architecture. On 13 March 1472, Ingolstadt became the seat of the first university in Bavaria, which later distinguished itself as the centre of the Counter-Reformation. The freethinking Illuminati order was also founded here in 1776. The city was also a Bavarian state fortress for more than 400 years. The historic old town has been preserved.

There are two colleges in the city. The place is one of the three regional centres in Bavaria. The city is mainly characterized by the manufacturing industry, such as automobile and mechanical engineering. The unemployment rate was 3.3% in February 2022.

== Geography ==
Covering an urban area of 133.35 km^{2} (51.49 sq mi), Ingolstadt is geographically Bavaria's fourth-largest city after Munich, Nuremberg, and Augsburg. At its largest point, the city is about 18 km (11 mi) from east to west and from north to south about 15 km (9 mi). The city boundary has a length of 70 km (43 mi).

The city boundary is about 14 km (9 mi) away from the geographic centre of Bavaria in Kipfenberg. The old town is approximately 374 m (1,227 ft) above sea level and the highest point, located in the district of Pettenhofen, is 410.87 m (1,348.00 ft). The lowest point of the Schutter confluence with the Danube is at 362 m (1,188 ft) above sea level. Ingolstadt uses Central European Time throughout Germany; the average time lag is 14 minutes.

The city is expanding at the northern and southern banks of the Danube in a wide, flat bowl. The Ingolstadt basin borders the Franconian Jura foothills, located south and to the north of the Donau-Isar-Hügelland. In the southwest is the Old Bavarian Donaumoos, while in the east, the lowland forests of the Danube reach into the urban area. It is the second-largest hardwood floodplain on the Danube. The Sandrach, the former southern main branch of the Danube, partly forms the southern city border. In the north, the Schutter flows through from the west, reaching the Danube near the old town.

== History ==
Ingolstadt was first mentioned in a document of Charlemagne on 6 February 806 as "Ingoldes stat", i.e. "the place of [a person named] Ingold". c. 1250, Ingolstadt was granted city status.

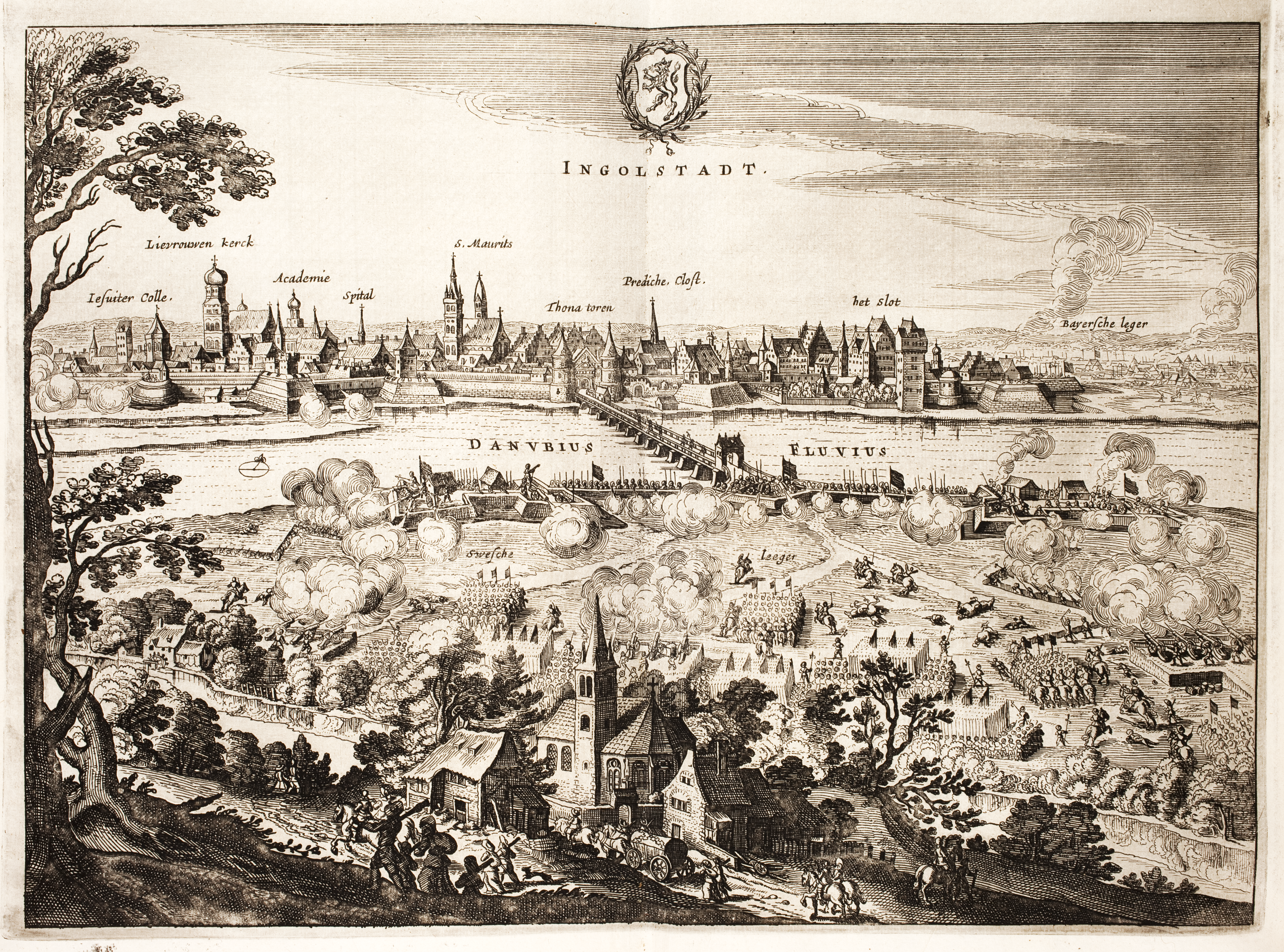
Siege of Ingolstadt with cannonade over the river Danube by the Swedish army of king Gustav II Adolf in 1632

Ingolstadt was the capital of the Duchy of Bavaria-Ingolstadt between 1392 and 1447. Ingolstadt was then united with Bavaria-Landshut. Louis VII, Duke of Bavaria ordered the building of the New Castle as well as the Church of Our Lady (Münster Zur Schönen Unserer Lieben Frau, also Liebfrauenmünster), also known as "Upper Parish" (Obere Pfarr), whose form was strongly influenced by French Gothic architecture.

In 1472, Louis IX, Duke of Bavaria founded the University of Ingolstadt, which became LMU Munich. In 1800, it was moved to Landshut and in 1826 eventually to Munich. The University of Ingolstadt was an influential defender of the Catholic Church during the Reformation era, led by such notable scholars as Johann Eck.

Ingolstadt is where William IV, Duke of Bavaria wrote and signed the Bavarian Reinheitsgebot in 1516.

On 30 April 1632, the German field marshal Johann Tserclaes, Count of Tilly died at Ingolstadt during a Swedish siege of the city. The field marshal had been badly wounded in a previous engagement with the Swedes under King Gustavus Adolphus. Ingolstadt proved to be the first fortress in Germany that held out for the entire length of the Swedish siege, and the Swedes eventually withdrew.

Gustavus Adolphus' horse's remains can be seen in the City Museum. The horse was shot from under the king by one of the cannons inside the fortress, a cannon known as "The Fig". When the Swedes withdrew, the city preserved the remains of the king's horse, eventually putting the Schwedenschimmel on display. It has remained thus for almost 400 years. In 1748, Adam Weishaupt, the founder of the Order of Illuminati, was born in Ingolstadt. After the French invasion in 1799, the fortress was demolished, and the university was relocated to Landshut.

Originally a fortress city, Ingolstadt is enclosed by a medieval defensive wall. The Bavarian fortress (1537–1930) now holds the Bavarian Army Museum. During World War I, future French president Charles de Gaulle was detained there as a prisoner of war. A sappers' drill ground lies next to the river. Two military air bases are located nearby, one used for testing aircraft. The long military tradition of the city is reflected in today's civil and cultural life. Former "off-limits" military training areas have been converted into well-used public parks.

Adolf Scherzer composed the "Bayerischer Defiliermarsch". Mary Shelley's Frankenstein was set at the Ingolstädter Alte Anatomie (Old Anatomy Building), now a museum for medical history. Marieluise Fleißer set her play Pioneers in Ingolstadt (1928) in the city.

== Economy ==
In 1945, the car manufacturer Auto Union first arrived in the city. The company's original factories in Chemnitz and Zwickau (both then in Soviet-controlled East Germany) were shattered during the war, and were seized by the Soviets as war reparations. Auto Union executives initially started a spare parts operation in Ingolstadt in the immediate post-war period, with a view to relocating the entire company to the region. With the help of Marshall Plan aid, Auto Union was formally re-founded in Ingolstadt in 1949, ultimately evolving into the modern-era Audi company, after it was taken over by Volkswagen in 1964. Today, Audi is the region's largest employer and dominates the economy of the city.

== Culture ==
=== Main sights ===
As one of five ducal residences of medieval Bavaria—besides Landshut, Munich, Straubing and Burghausen—the city of Ingolstadt features many Gothic buildings, such as the Herzogskasten ('old ducal castle', c. 1255) and the New Castle, which was built from 1418 onwards. The largest church is the Gothic hall church of Our Lady, which was begun in 1425. The church was built to serve as a second parish church beside Saint Maurice, as well as the burial place for Louis and his family and was intended to be the official burial place for the future Dukes of Bavaria-Ingolstadt. Its peculiar and rare angle of footprint was emulated in the 20th-century-built Cathedral of Newark. Also, the churches of Saint Maurice (1235) and of the Gnadenthal and Franciscan monasteries date from the Gothic era. The Kreuztor (1385) is one of the remaining gates of the old city wall and, to this day, the key landmark of the city. The Gothic Old City Hall was constructed in the 14th century and was later altered several times.

=== Theatre ===
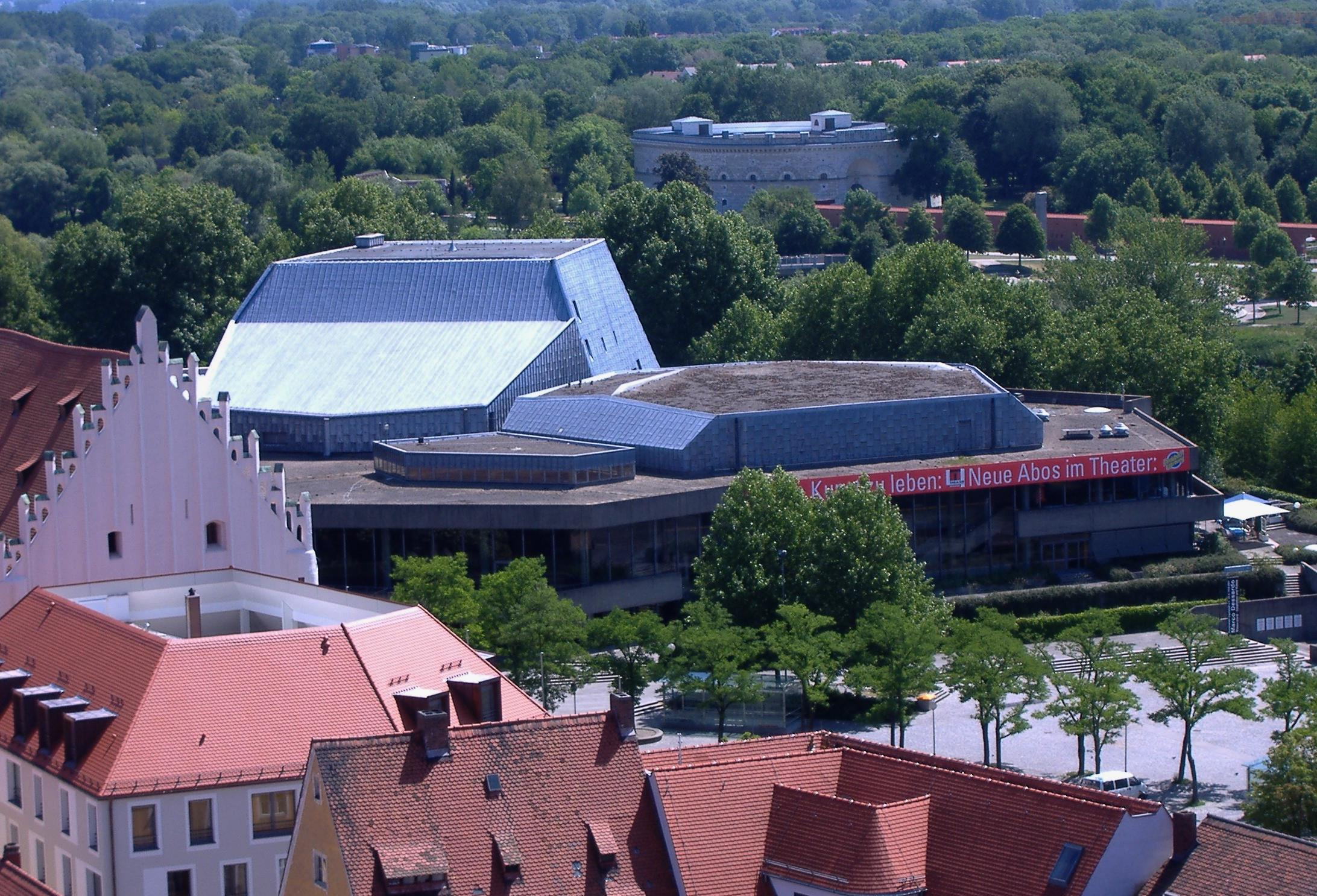
Stadttheater Ingolstadt

After the old Stadttheater in Ingolstadt was destroyed during World War II, it wasn't until 1966 that a new venue was built. The new Stadttheater was designed by architect Hardt-Waltherr Hämer and seats 663 people. In addition to this main theatre, the Ingolstadt Theater–complex includes four smaller venues. The Kleine Haus am Turm Baur, the open-air stage at Turm Baur, the Studio im Herzogskasten, and the Werkstattbühne, which is also located in the Hämer building. A total of around 500 performances take place in the Stadttheater Ingolstadt each year. The city also has a large number of other stages run by theatre groups with various sponsors.

The theatre has been undergoing extensive renovations since 2007, and a complete renovation is planned for the end of 2027, but yet uncertain because of the difficult financial situation of the city.

=== Museums ===
Ingolstadt is home to 11 museums run by various organizations (see: de:Liste der Museen in Ingolstadt).

The largest and oldest museum in the city is the Bayerisches Armeemuseum (Bavarian Army Museum), which houses a collection of weapons, equipment, uniforms, flags, standards, paintings, and medals with a focus on the Bavarian Army, as well as the Bavarian Army Library. The museum is located in the New Palace and the Reduit Tilly and covers military history up to and including World War I.

The Bavarian Police Museum is the newest museum in Ingolstadt. It is located in the Triva Turm– a neoclassicistic building, built between 1828 and 1841 – which opened in 2011. It is a branch of the Bavarian Army Museum. The museum documents the development of the police force in Bavaria since 1918/19.

The Deutsches Medizinhistorisches Museum (German Museum of Medical History) – opened in 1973 and housed in the "Alte Anatomie" (a Baroque building, built between 1723 and 1736) – traces the development of medicine since the time of Ancient Egypt and is the only museum of its kind in Germany. In addition to surgical instruments, the museum features a botanical garden with a wide variety of medicinal plants.

The Stadtmuseum Ingolstadt (Ingolstadt City Museum) displays numerous exhibits that trace the development of the city and the region from ancient times to the present day. For example, the Kavalier Hepp building (a spacious fortification built between 1838 and 43 houses the amber necklace and a replica of Jakob Sandtner’s city model, and the white horse of King Gustav Adolf of Sweden. The Schwedenschimmel (Swedish Grey) is a stuffed warhorse that belonged to King Gustav II Adolf of Sweden; it was struck by a bullet and killed in 1632 during the Siege of Ingolstadt . It is considered the oldest preserved animal specimen in Europe.

Since 1998, the Kavalier Hepp has also housed the Spielzeug Museum (Museum of Toys).

The Bauerngerätemuseum (Farm Equipment Museum) is also part of the City Museum.

The Museum of Concrete Art exhibits works of artists of the concrete art movement. The Museum is guided by the universal idea of Concrete Art, which shares close affinities with Minimalism. In addition to an extensive collection of artworks, the museum has been collecting design objects since 2000. In 2026, the museum will still be located in the old building on Tränktorstraße, but is expected to move to a new building in 2027. At that time, the museum's name will also change to the Museum of Concrete Art and Design.

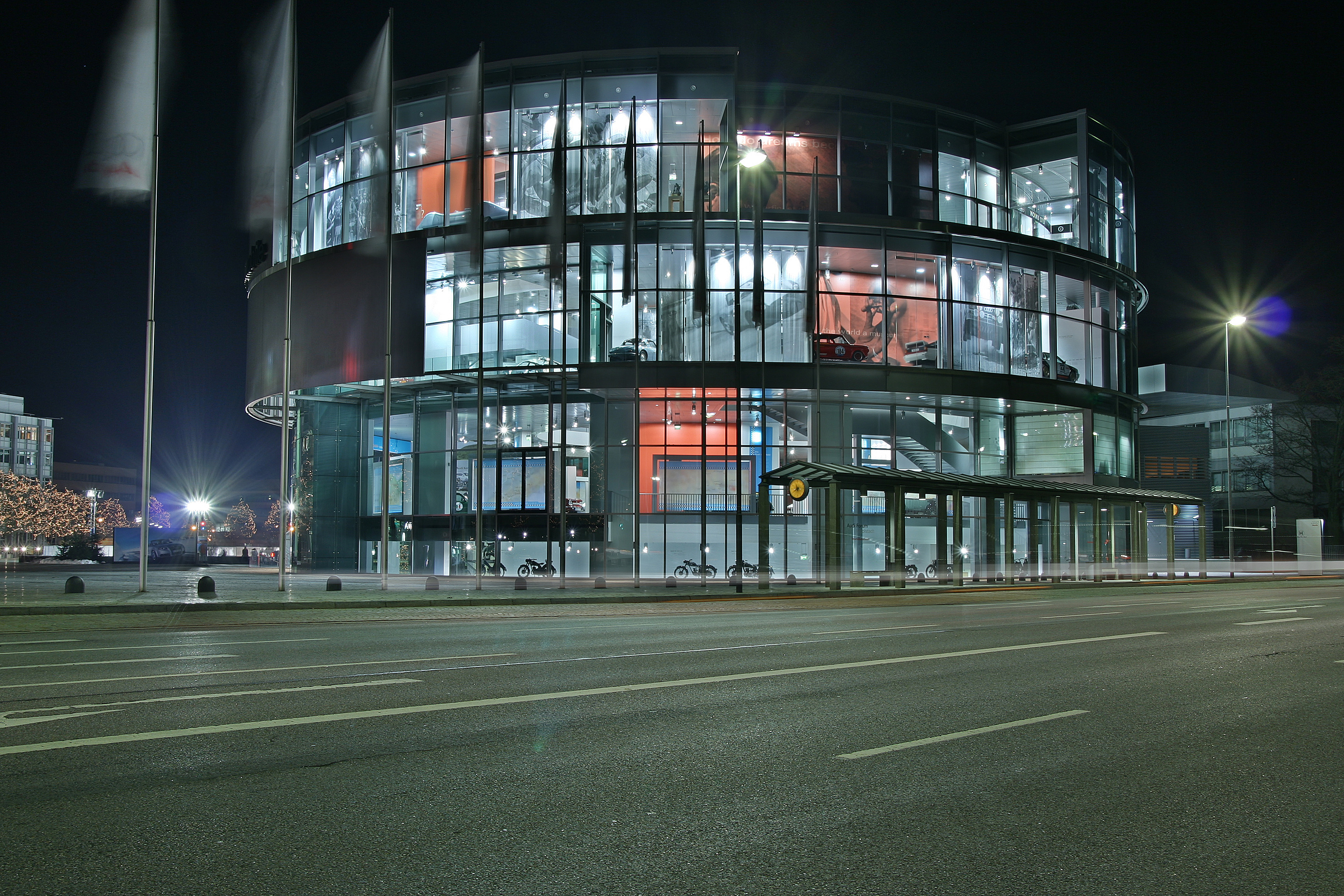
Audi museum mobile

The Audi museum mobile is a museum of Audi in Ingolstadt, showcasing historic car models and motorbikes of the company. It is situated in a round, fully glazed building, which draws on the principal of annual rings of a tree trunk. The museum shows the historic development of the company and gives additional info on the economic and societal conditions of the time. Audi with its ArtExperience-department also is a regular sponsor of cultural events like Classical music-concerts and the Salzburg Festival. In 2007 Audi was one of the cofounders of the Stiftung für Konkrete Kunst und Design Ingolstadt, which is connected to the Museum of Concrete Art and deals with the conservation of the legacy of prominent artists.

There are also smaller museums and memorial sites, such as the Alf Lechner Sculpture Museum, the Heimatmuseum Niemes-Prachatitz, a local history museum, which houses the local history collection of the town of Niemes and the district of Prachatitz in Bohemia.

Marieluise Fleißer, who was born in Ingolstadt, has a museum located in Fleißer's childhood home.

== Education ==
=== Quartier G ===
The newly created “Quartier G” is designed to become “the new creative hotspot” (in German "ein neues Kraftzentrum") in the city. Situated at the eastern part of the old town, the Alte Gießereihalle, a historic hall dating from 1882, will be at the center of this hub. In 2027 the Museum of Concrete Art will move from its old location to this renovated estate. Six institutions are set to establish themselves in this area around the Alte Gießereihalle: the Technische Hochschule Ingolstadt, the Audi Academy (an in-house training academy for Audi employees), the Maritim Hotel (with a convention center), the Museum of Concrete Art, the Ingolstadt Economic Development Agency (IfG), and the digital startup hub "brigk". (Brigk is a made-up word derived from the English word for "brick" – referring to the building itself – and the location in Kavalier Dallwigk.) The Kavalier Dallwigk is part of the historic fortification, having been built between 1828 and 1841: "A cavalier towers over the adjacent fortifications and is used to position the artillery." (in German "Ein Kavalier überragt die ihm benachbarten Festungsbauten und dient der Positionierung der Artillerie.") This hub is intended to foster syngergies and networking opportunities within Ingolstadt's cultural and creative industries. The redesign and revitalization of the intensely renovated Alte Gießereihalle of the Museum of Concrete Art (MKKD) is also expected to enhance the quality of the local environment: "The central plaza between the future MKKD and the neighboring university buildings has the potential to become a new gathering place for the city." (in German "Der zentrale Platz zwischen dem zukünftigen MKKD und den benachbarten Hochschulgebäuden hat das Potential zu einem neuen Begegnungsort der Stadt zu werden.")

=== Universities ===
==== Technische Hochschule Ingolstadt ====
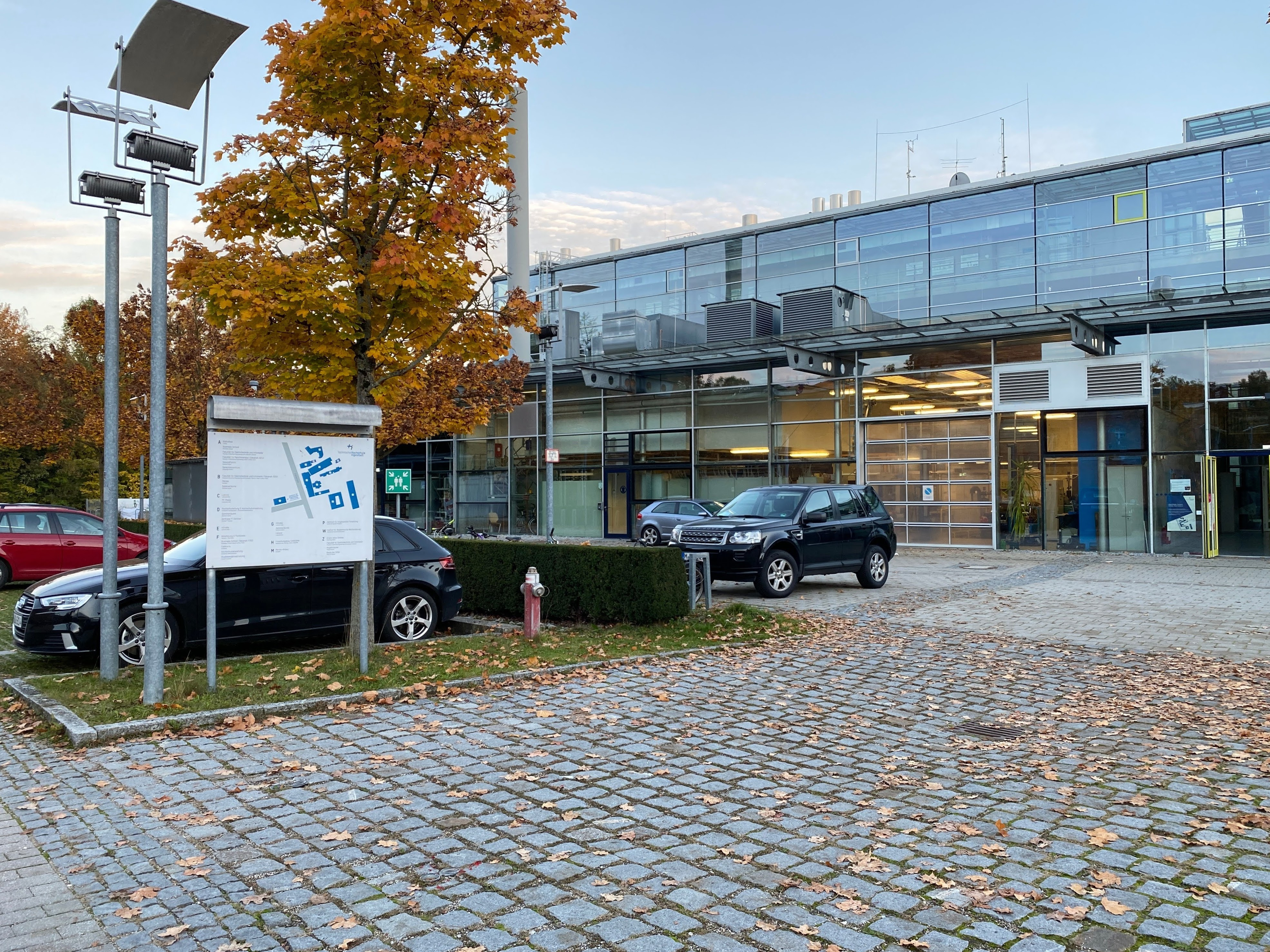
Technische Hochschule Ingolstadt

The Technische Hochschule Ingolstadt (THI) is a university for technology, computer sciences and business administration. With approximately 8,600 students, it is the biggest educational institution in Ingolstadt.

Several scholarship programmes supported by companies such as Siemens and the Continental AG provide gifted students with financial assistance during their studies. These students deepen their practical experience by working at these organizations. THI offers several undergraduate and graduate programmes, which are called Dual Degree Study as part of the study is working in the companies participating in the program.

==== Catholic University of Eichstätt-Ingolstadt ====
The Catholic University of Eichstätt-Ingolstadt offers about 70 bachelor's and master's degrees. They also have an International Double Degree Program which allows students to get a degree in two different countries at the same time. The university has 4840 students, 1029 of them come from a foreign country. 120 Professors work there. The Ingolstadt School of Management is one important department of the university. The department offers bachelor's degrees and master's degrees in business administration. Among the academic programs offered are also executive MBA and doctoral degrees. It opened in 1989.

=== Schools ===
Ingolstadt is home to the Apian Gymnasium, which offers specifictions in Science and Technology, Languages, and Economics.The school is named after Peter Apian and his son Philipp Apian, who were eminent mathematicians, astronomers, and cartographers in Ingolstadt.

The Christoph Scheiner-Gymnasium, named after Christoph Scheiner, offers specifications in Natural science and Languages.

The Gnadenthal-Gymnasium is a catholic gymnasium which focuses on musical studies. 22 certified instrumental teachers are teaching 24 instruments, and there are two additional vocal teachers for solo-singing.

The Staatliche Fachoberschule Ingolstadt offers education in Technology, Economics, Administration and Social services. It has more than 1000 students.

All together Ingolstadt has eight mittelschules, four special schools, five real schools/wirtschaftsschules, seven gymnasiums, two fachoberschules/berufsoberschules, two berufschules and fourteen berufsfachschules.

== Demographics ==
Population development since 1450:

Historical population
Year	Pop.	±%
1450	3,000	—
1630	6,500	+116.7%
1871	13,157	+102.4%
1900	22,207	+68.8%
1919	26,013	+17.1%
1925	26,630	+2.4%
1933	28,628	+7.5%
1939	33,394	+16.6%
1950	40,523	+21.3%
1961	53,405	+31.8%
1970	70,414	+31.8%
1987	96,071	+36.4%
2001	117,311	+22.1%
2011	124,927	+6.5%
2018	138,181	+10.6%

Largest groups of foreign residents
Nationality	Population (2018)
Turkey	4,438
Romania	2,583
Greece	1,405
Croatia	1,332
Italy	1,155
Kosovo	1,126
Poland	1,103
Hungary	942

=== Parks and natural areas ===
Ingolstadt is a green city with numerous parks, green spaces and forests. The most prominent of these is the "Glacis", formerly an open space in front of the city walls, now surrounding the historic city centre. It functions as a "green belt" and a buffer area between traffic, residential areas and schools. It is possible to traverse it using spacious paths for pedestrians and cyclists, with a good view of the site of the former fortifications, including a well-preserved section of the ditch. Spanning about 50 acres (20 ha) of the Glacis is Klenzepark, the biggest park in the city. It contained the former Ingolstadt State Fortress and was the site of the Landesgartenschau in 1992. Klenzepark is south of the Danube, opposite the Ingolstadt old town. In the warm seasons, about 100,000 visitors use the park every month, mostly young people. While about 75% of the park visitors come from Ingolstadt and the surrounding area, the remaining approximately 25% travel from more distant places.

The biggest forest in Ingolstadt is the Auwald ("riverside forest", also called "Schüttel"). It is found on both the northern and southern banks of the Danube, and is one of the biggest well-preserved river forests in Germany, extending mainly from Neuburg to Ingolstadt with extensions to the city centre. The forest serves as a natural reserve, with parts containing unique vegetation or acting as a wildlife reserve.

The river Danube runs through Ingolstadt, flowing from west to east. In the area of Ingolstadt, the Danube is between 80 and 100 metres wide and flows past Ingolstadt's old town.

== Sports ==
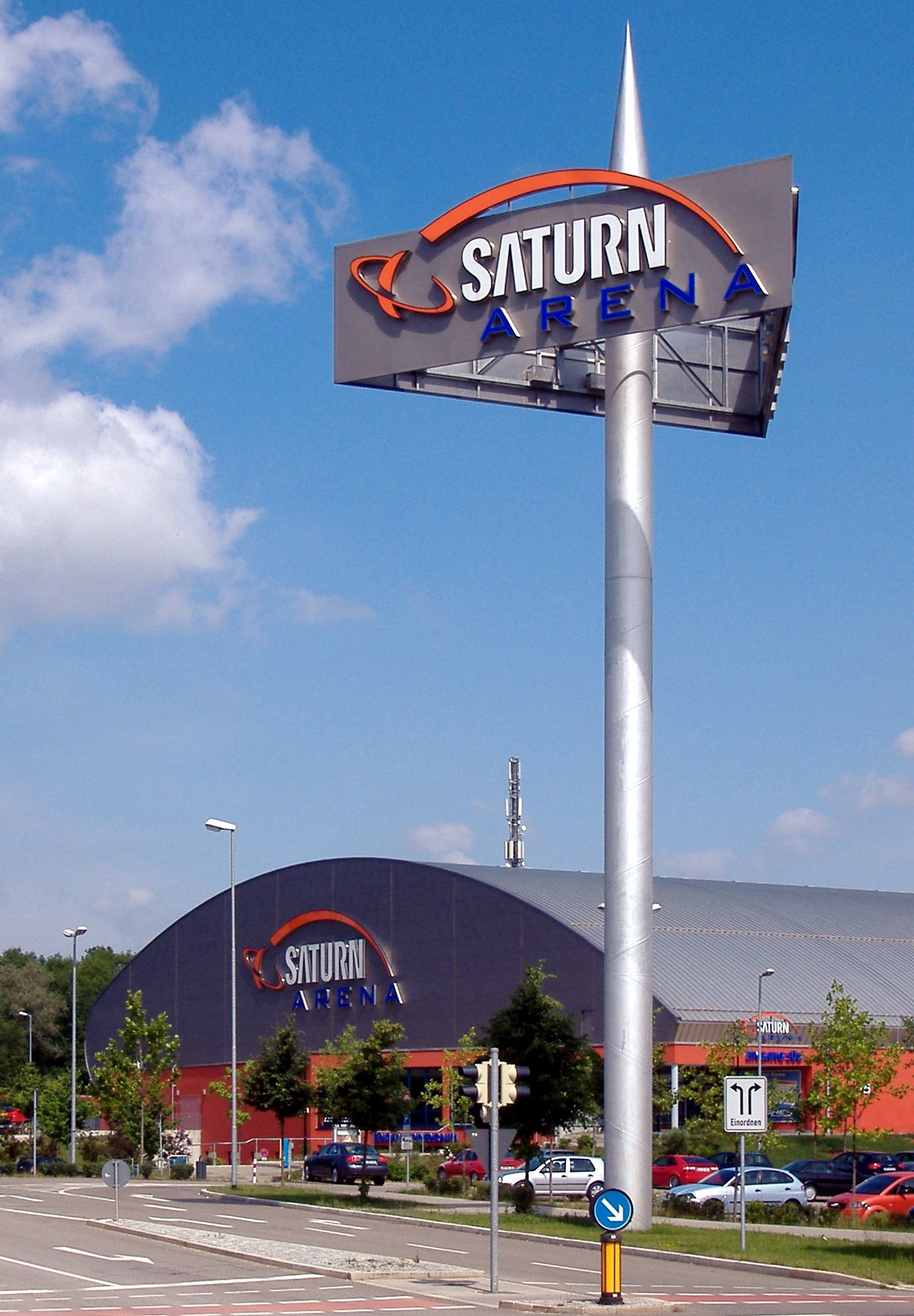
The Saturn Arena, home of ERC Ingolstadt

The sports life of the city is based on the 83 registered sports clubs. The biggest sports club is the MTV 1881 Ingolstadt, with over 3000 registered members in 16 branches. In total, the sports clubs in Ingolstadt have more than 41,000 members.

Ingolstadt is especially known for ice hockey and association football. ERC Ingolstadt, founded in 1964, plays in the German Ice Hockey League since the 2002–03 season. With the exception of its season of debut and 2007–08, the club has reached the national playoffs every year as of 2014, and has reached the semi-finals three times. They won the German Ice Hockey League Championship in 2014.

The football club FC Ingolstadt 04 came into existence in 2004 after the merger of the football branches of MTV Ingolstadt and ESV Ingolstadt. In the 2007–08 season, it was promoted from the third-highest division at the time, Regionalliga Süd to 2. Bundesliga. In the 2008–09 season, it was relegated to the penultimate place, but was promoted again in 2010-11 and remained in 2nd place. Bundesliga till 2015. In 2015, Ingolstadt won the 2. Bundesliga and were promoted to the country's highest league, the Bundesliga. During their first season in the Bundesliga, Ingolstadt finished in 11th place. They were relegated to 2. Bundesliga by the end of the 2016–17 season.

== Transport ==
The nearest airports to the city are Munich Airport, located 68 km (42 mi) south east and Nuremberg Airport, which is located 105 km (65 mi) north of Ingolstadt.

== Literary references ==
Ingolstadt is one of the many settings in Mary Shelley's novel Frankenstein. Primarily, Victor Frankenstein attends university in Ingolstadt. It is also widely regarded as the place where the unnamed monster was created.

The Illuminati was founded in Ingolstadt and Shelley's husband, Percy Bysshe Shelley, was sympathetic to the radical group's aim of freeing society from Christian influence. In 1810 as a student at Oxford he wrote to his friend Thomas Jefferson Hogg: “I burn with impatience for the moment of Xtianity's dissolution” and signed off with the Illuminati's catchphrase “écrasez l'infâme”.

The musical version of the novel, Frankenstein – A New Musical has many scenes set in Ingolstadt.

Ingolstadt is also a pivotal location in The Illuminatus! Trilogy by Robert Shea and Robert Anton Wilson.

The sixth scene of Mother Courage and Her Children by Bertolt Brecht is set in Ingolstadt, when Count Tilly died in 1632, during the "Thirty Years' War".

Rainer Werner Fassbinder's 1971 film Pioneers in Ingolstadt is set in the town.

The X-Files episode "The Post-Modern Prometheus" makes a reference to the University of Ingolstadt. This was an allusion to Frankenstein, as the episode contained numerous Frankenstein references, and the full title of Frankenstein is "Frankenstein: or, The Modern Prometheus".

In the Terra Ignota series, Ingolstadt is the capital of Gordian, one of the world's seven Hives.

In the Warhammer 40,000 universe, Fabius Bile, a renegade Space Marine, was born in Ingolstadt in the 30th Millennium.

== Twin towns – sister cities ==
Ingolstadt is twinned with:

- Carrara, Italy
- Central AO (Moscow), Russia
- Moscow, Russia
- Foshan, China
- Grasse, France
- Győr, Hungary
- Kirkcaldy, Scotland, United Kingdom
- Kragujevac, Serbia
- Manisa, Turkey
- Murska Sobota, Slovenia
- Opole, Poland

== Organizations and clubs ==
- MTV 1881 Ingolstadt, Ingolstadt's major sports club
- FC Ingolstadt 04, Footballclub in 2. Bundesliga (II)
- Grün-Weiß Ingolstadt, Footballclub in Kreisklasse (IX)
- Ingolstadt Schanzer, Baseball team in 2. Bundesliga (II)
- ERC Ingolstadt, Ice hockey team in DEL (I)
- The Bavarian Illuminati
- Ingolstadt Dukes, American football in GFL (I)

== Gallery ==
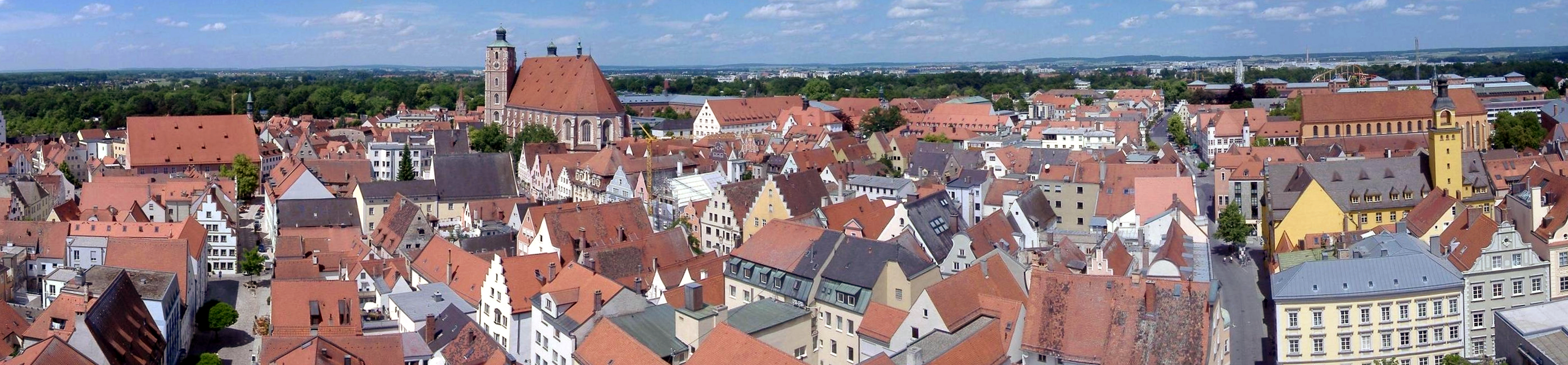
North side of the city

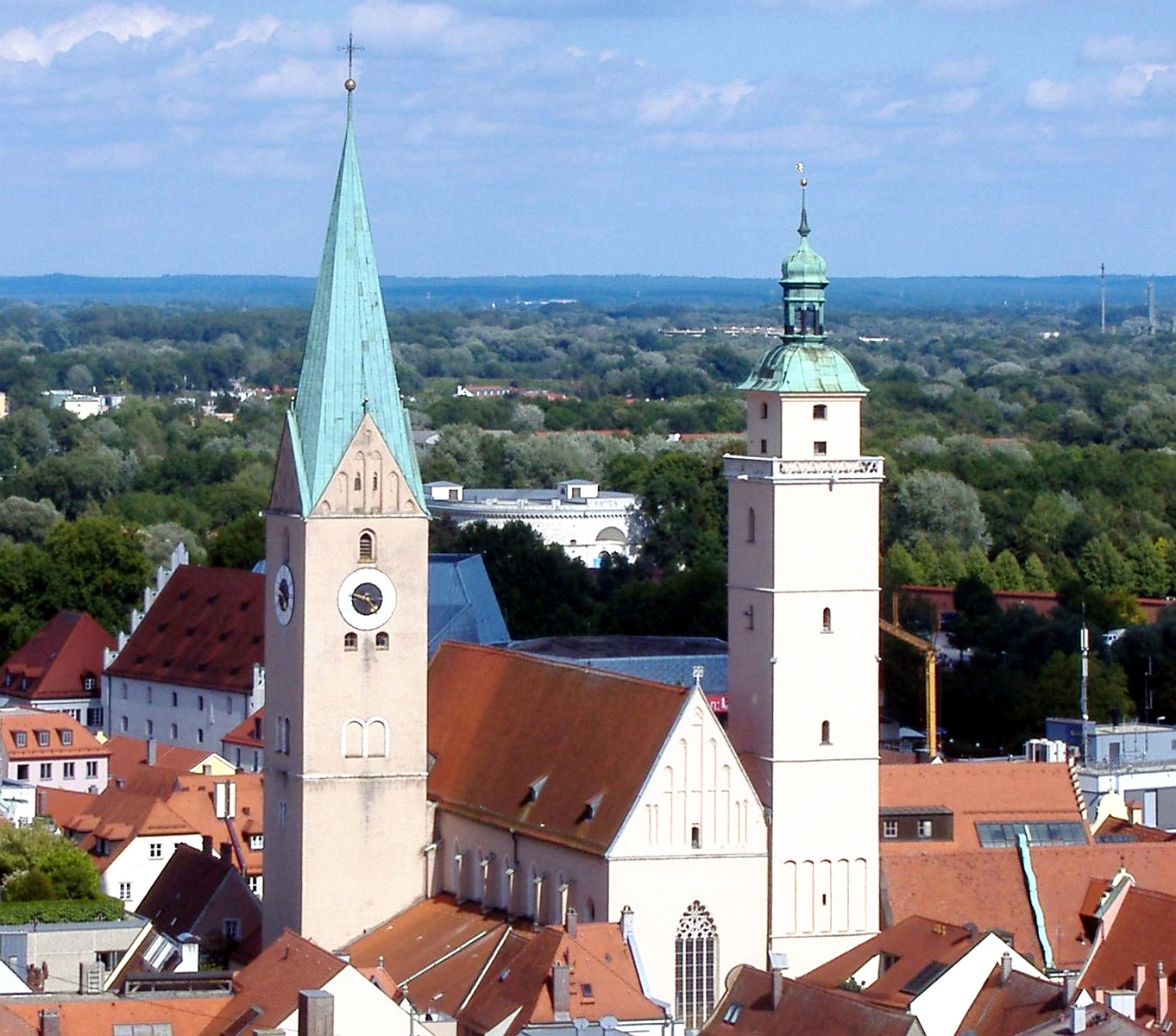
St. Maurice Church in Ingolstadt

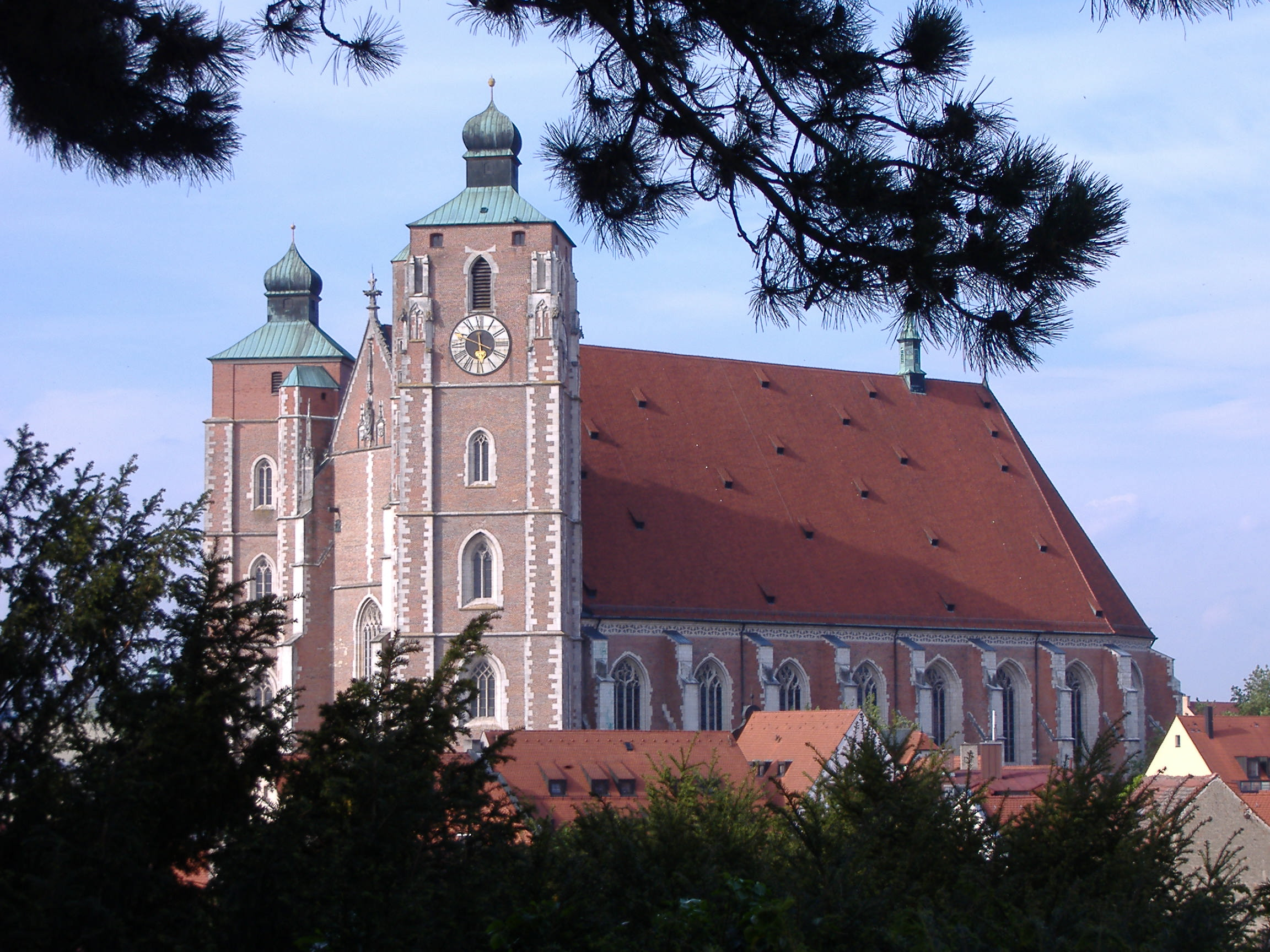
Münster Zur Schönen Unserer Lieben Frau

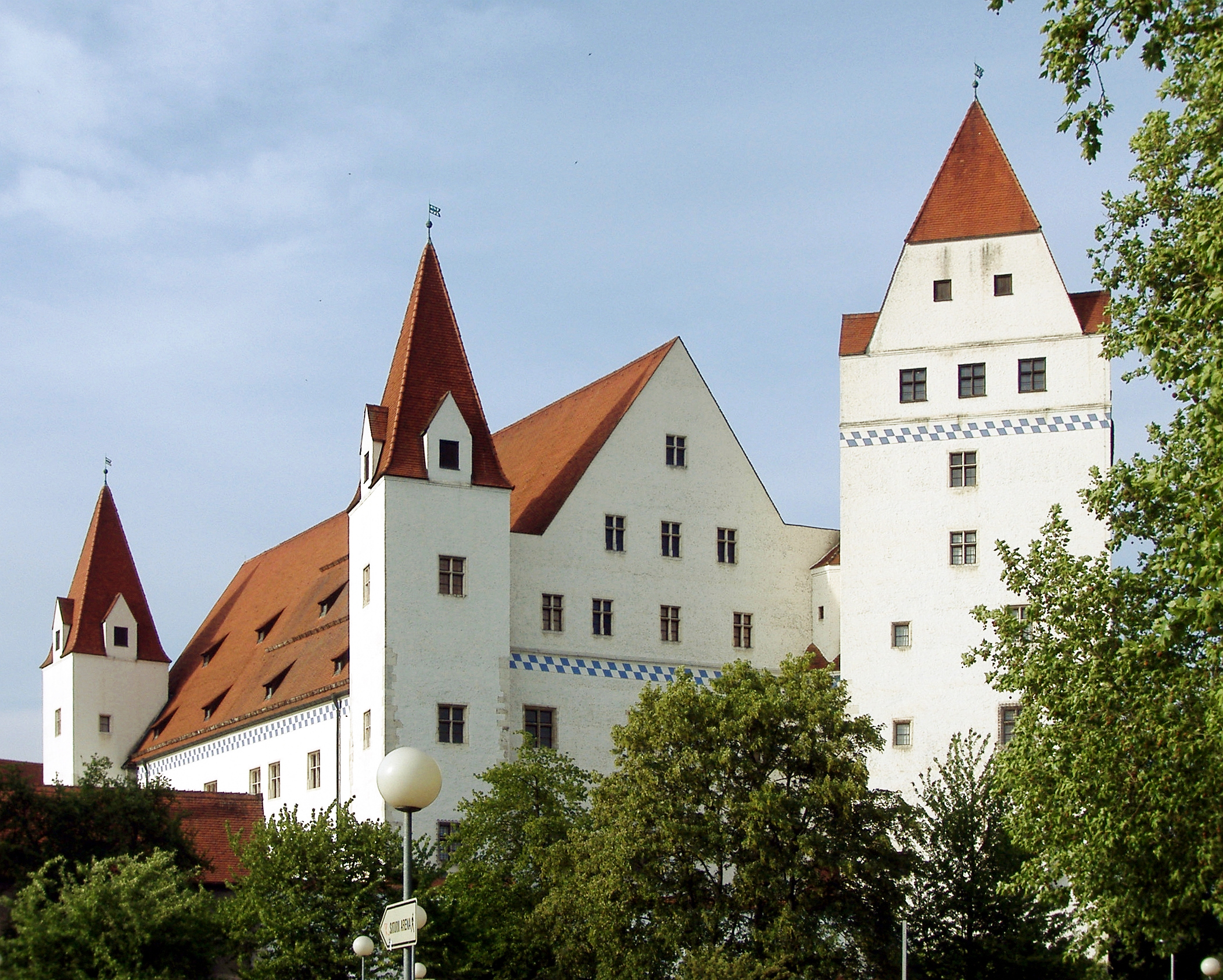
New Castle, which houses the main collection of the Bayerisches Armeemuseum

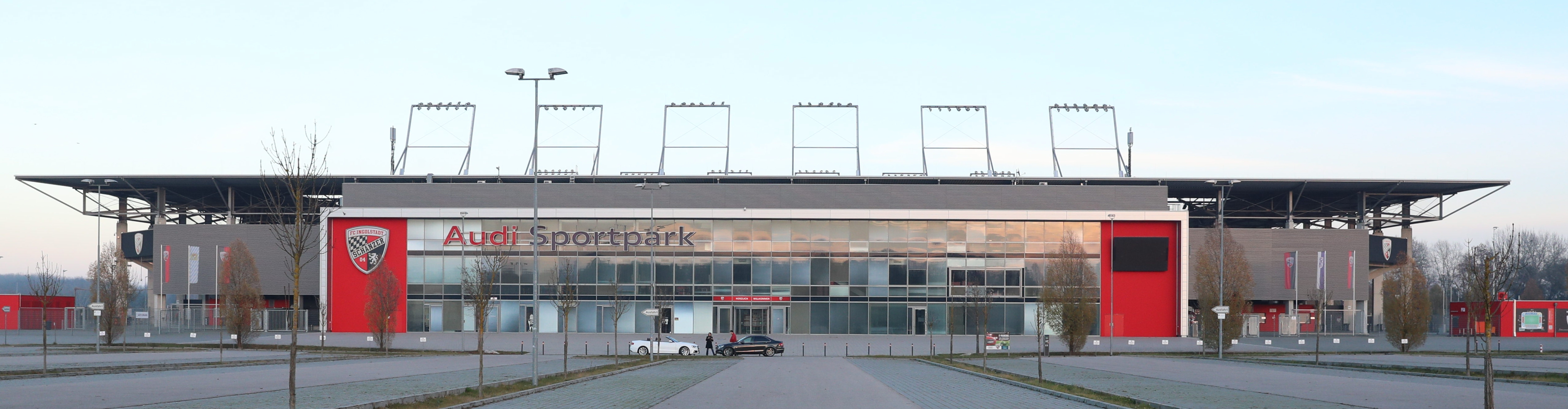
Audi Sportpark, the home of FC Ingolstadt 04

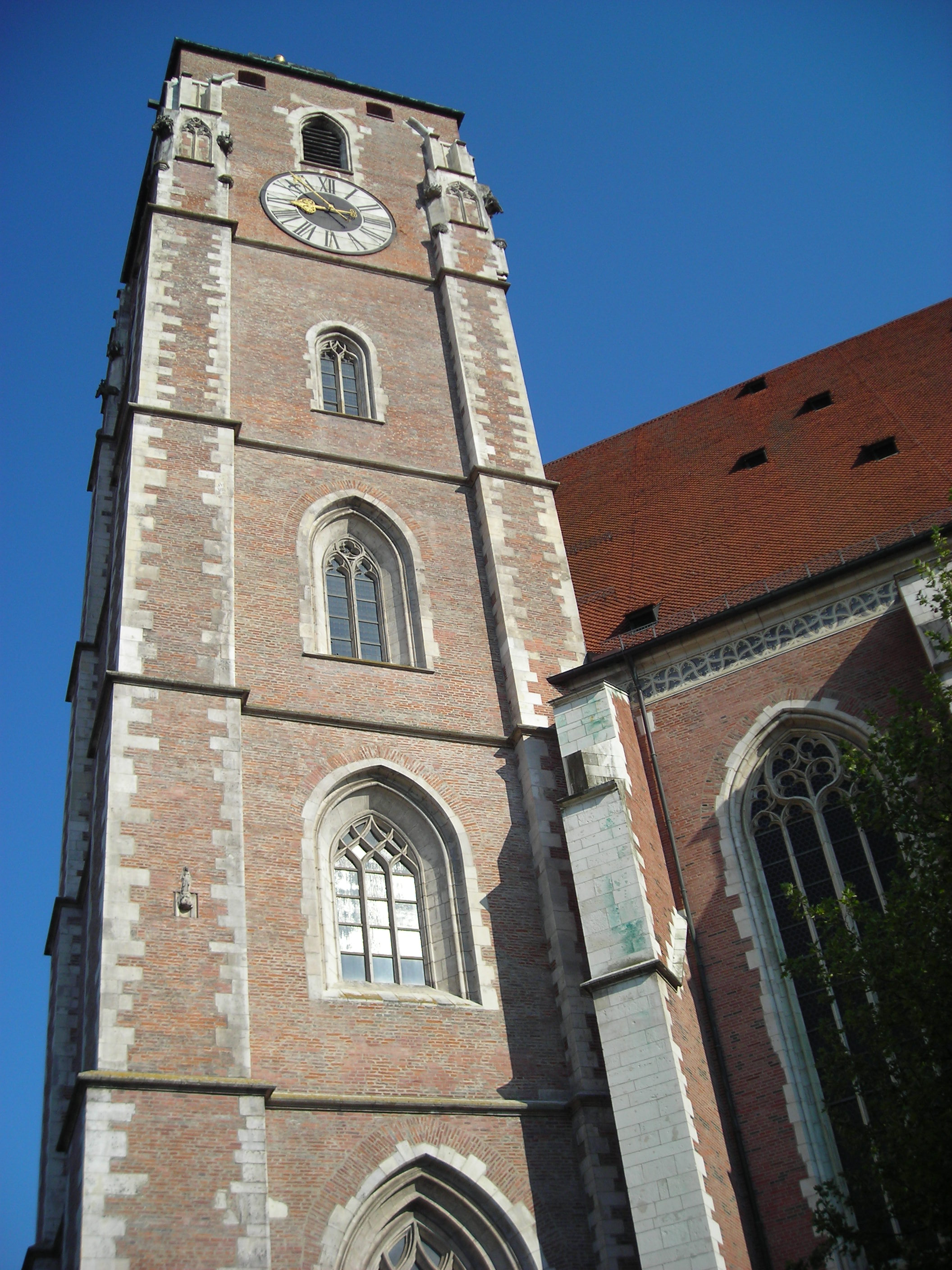
Church of Our Lady

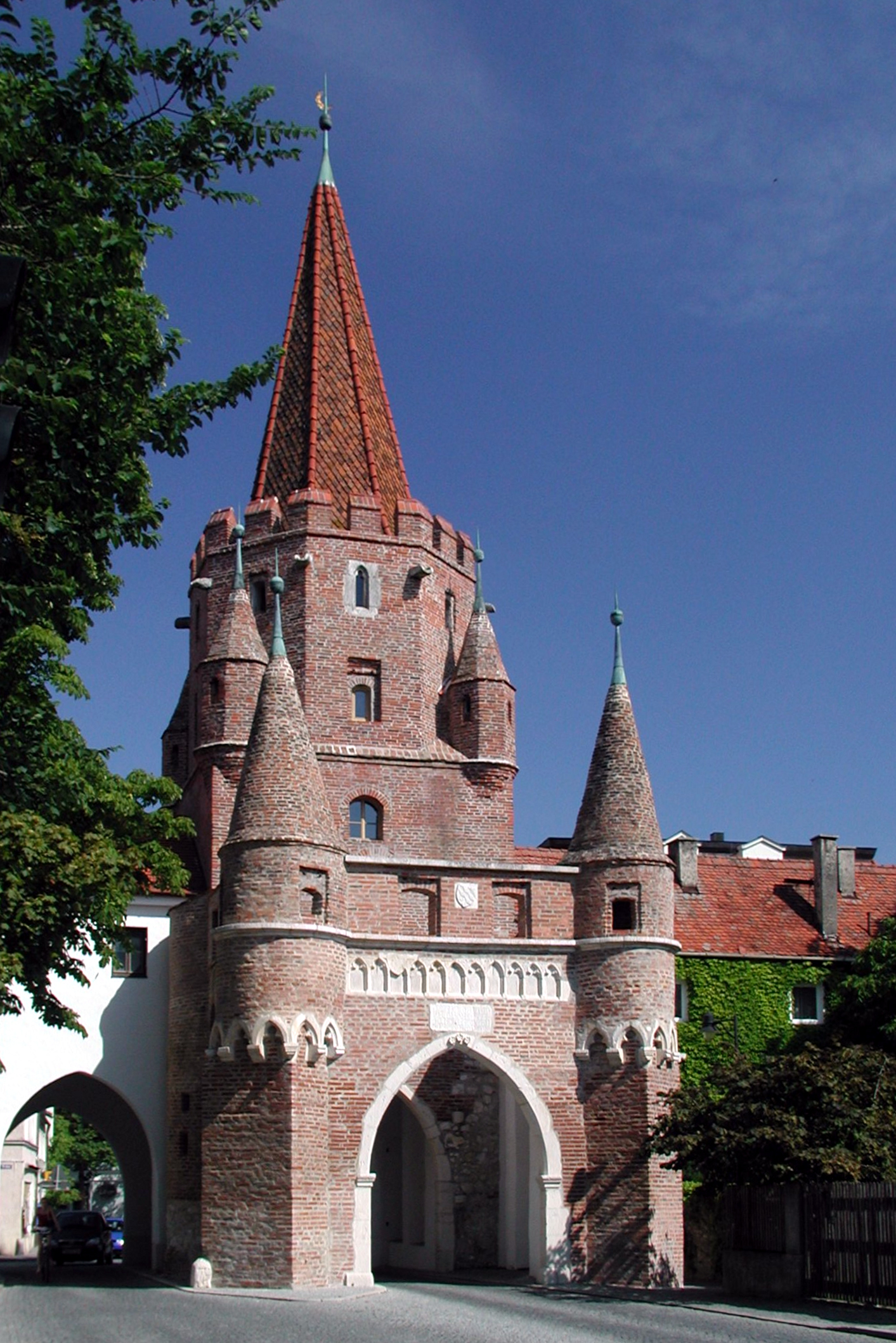
The Kreuztor

== Notable people ==
- Philipp Apian (1531–1589), mathematician
- Adam Weishaupt (1748–1830), philosopher
- Marieluise Fleißer (1901–1974), author and playwright
- Michael Heltau (born 1933), German-Austrian actor
- Erich Kellerhals (1939–2017), businessman
- Horst Seehofer (born 1949), politician
- Eva Bulling-Schröter (born 1956), politician
- Stefan Klingele (born 1967), conductor
- Reinhard Brandl (born 1977), politician
- Christian Engelhart (born 1986), racing driver
- Patrick Schranner (born 1991), racing driver
- Emilie Bernhardt, (born 2002), football player
