= New Castle (Ingolstadt) =

Coordinates: 48°45′53″N 11°25′50″E

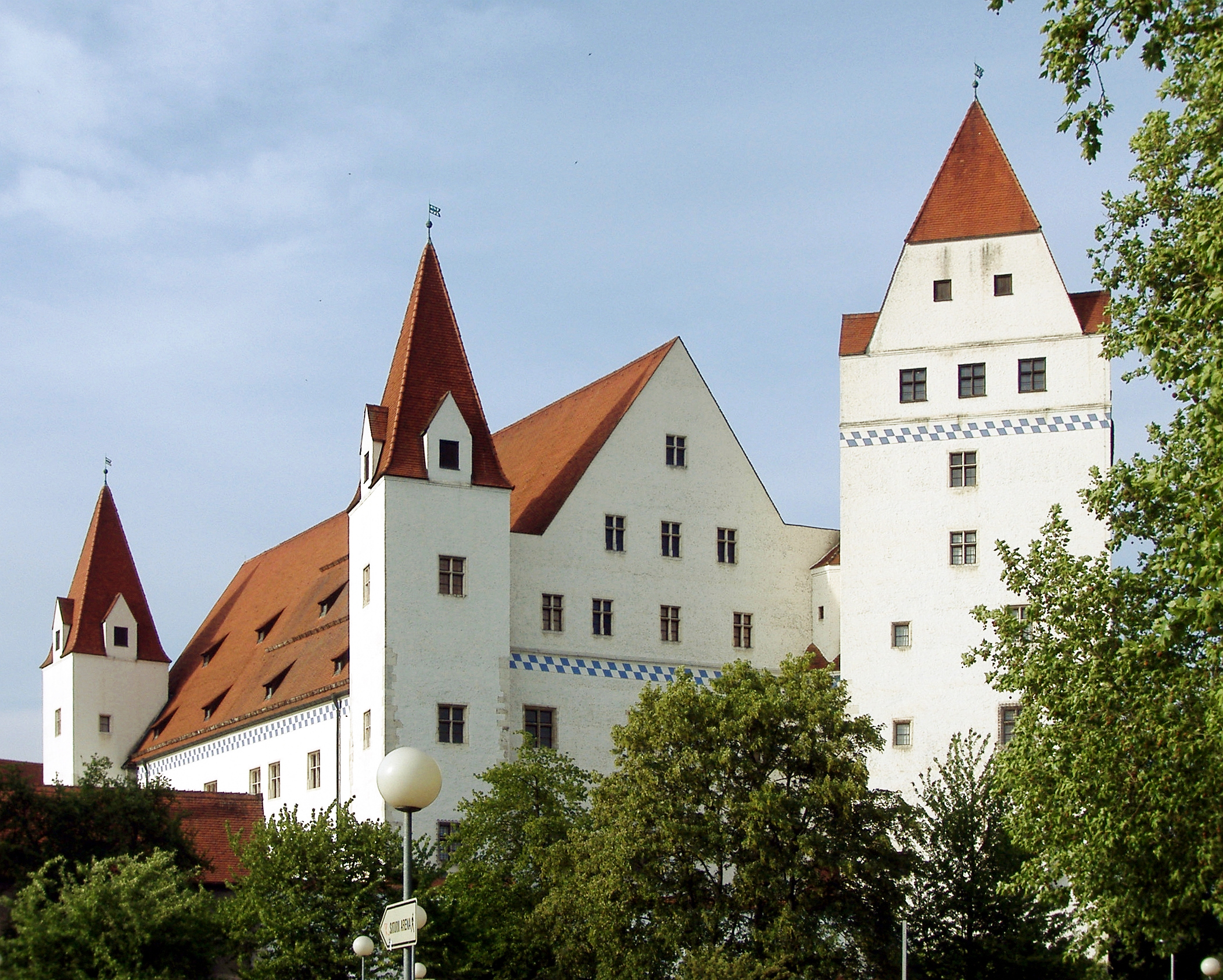
New Castle in Ingolstadt

The New Castle in Ingolstadt is one of the most important Gothic secular buildings of the 15th Century in Bavaria. The builders were Louis VII, Duke of Bavaria-Ingolstadt and Duke George the Rich of Bavaria-Landshut, both of the Wittelsbach dynasty. The neighboring Old Castle, a medieval fortress from the 13th Century, is today called Herzogkasten.

== History ==
As a brother of the French queen Isabeau, Ludwig spent more than ten years in France. After returning to his home city of Ingolstadt, he could draw on abundant finances and in 1418 gave the order to build the new castle following French models. By his death only the foundations had been built. The present structure was built largely on the old foundation until 1489 under the Landshut dukes, as evidenced by the surviving detailed invoices.

== Current use ==
In the 1960s, it was re-established by Ministerial decree and the Bavarian Army Museum was opened in 1972, including workshops and restaurants.
