= Pranckh =

Austrian noble family

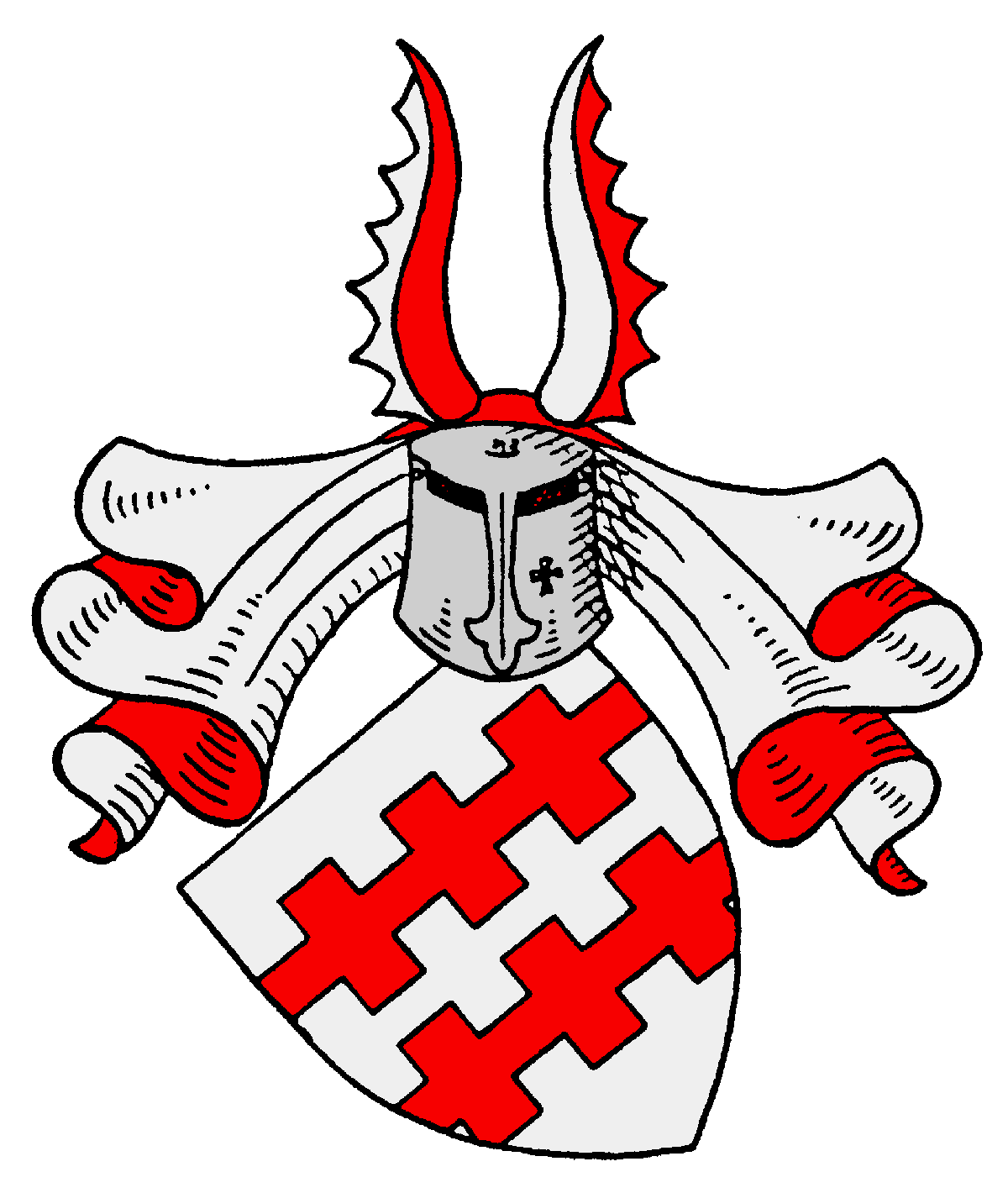
Pranckh coat of arms

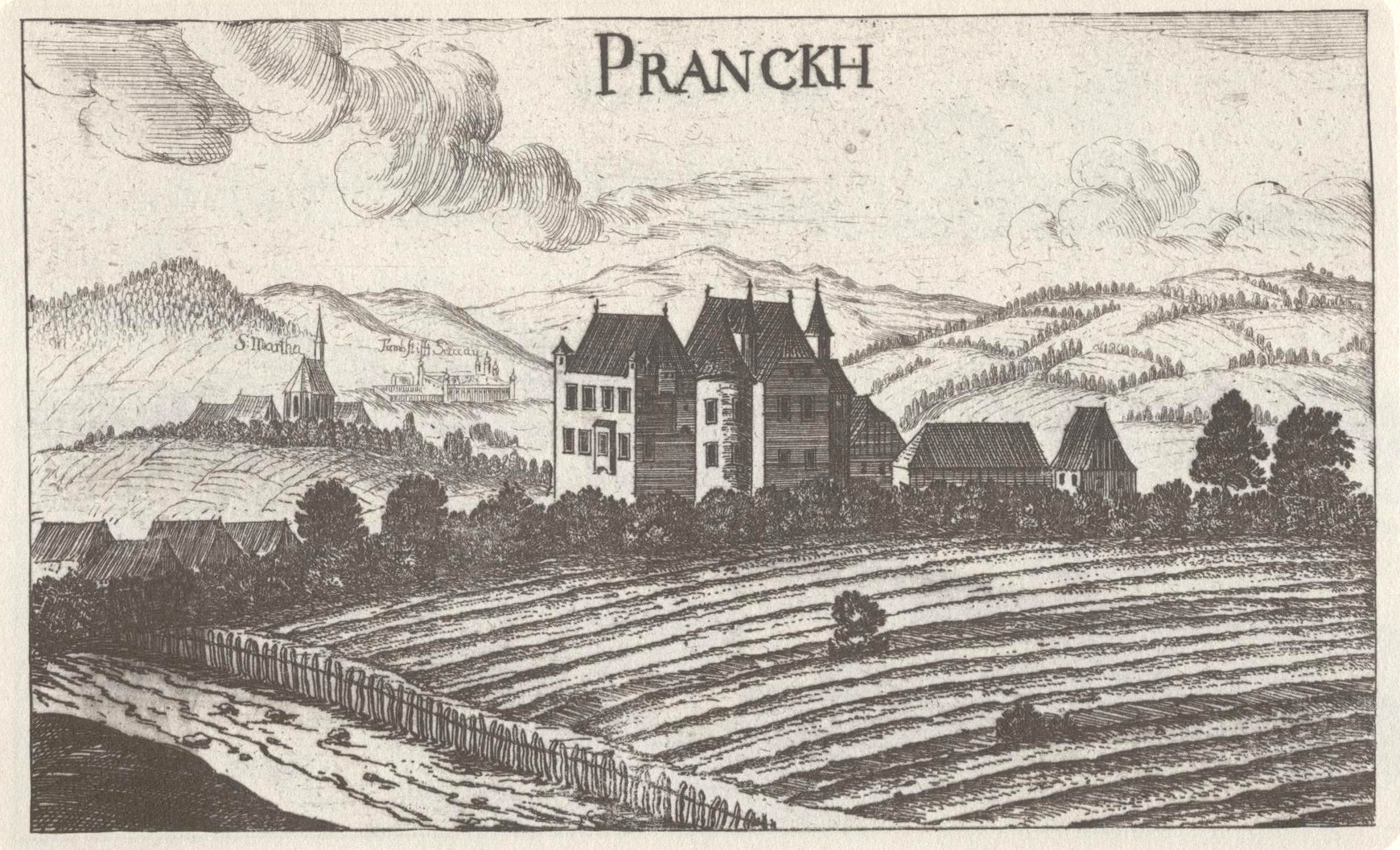
Castle Pranckh

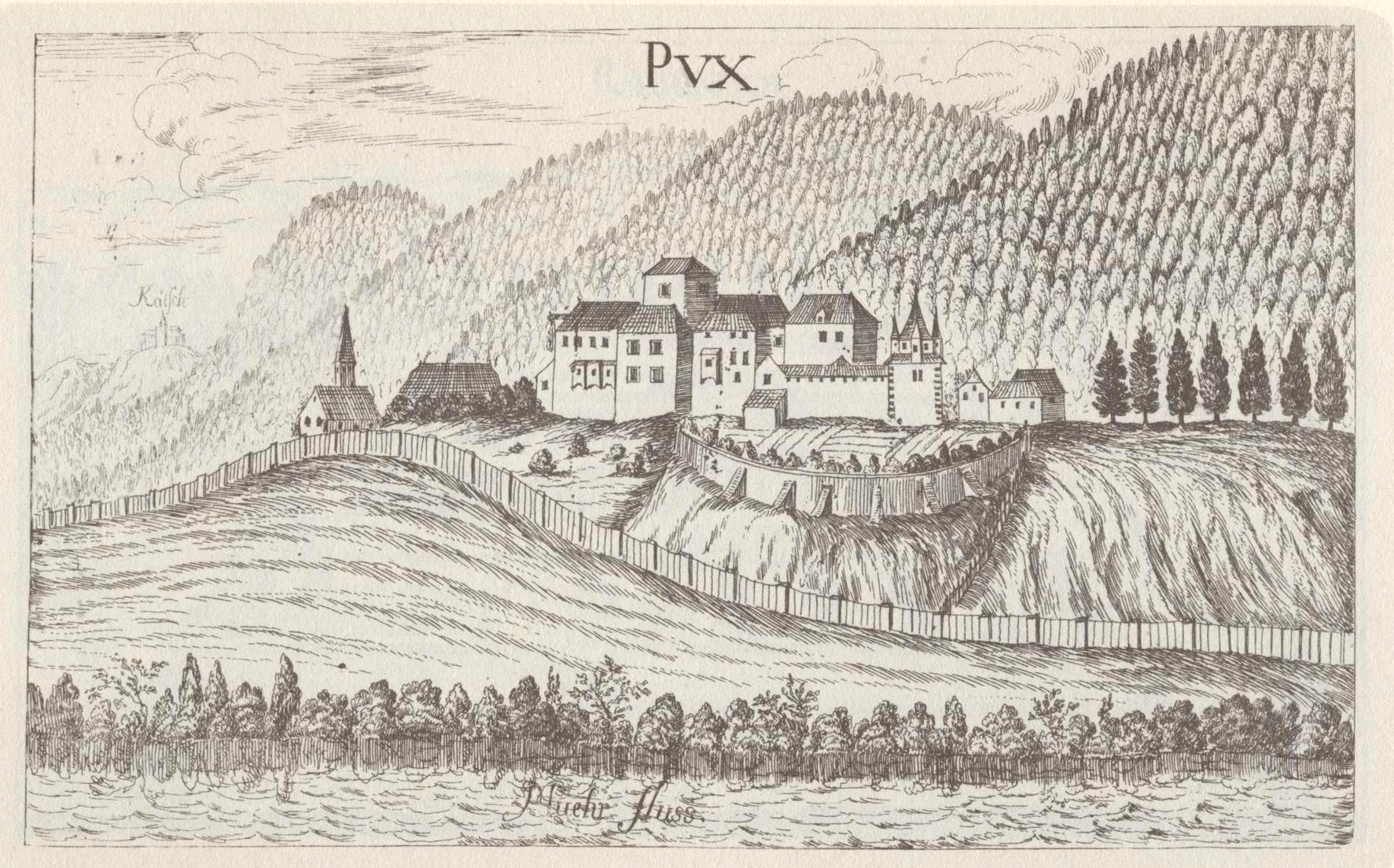
Castle Pux

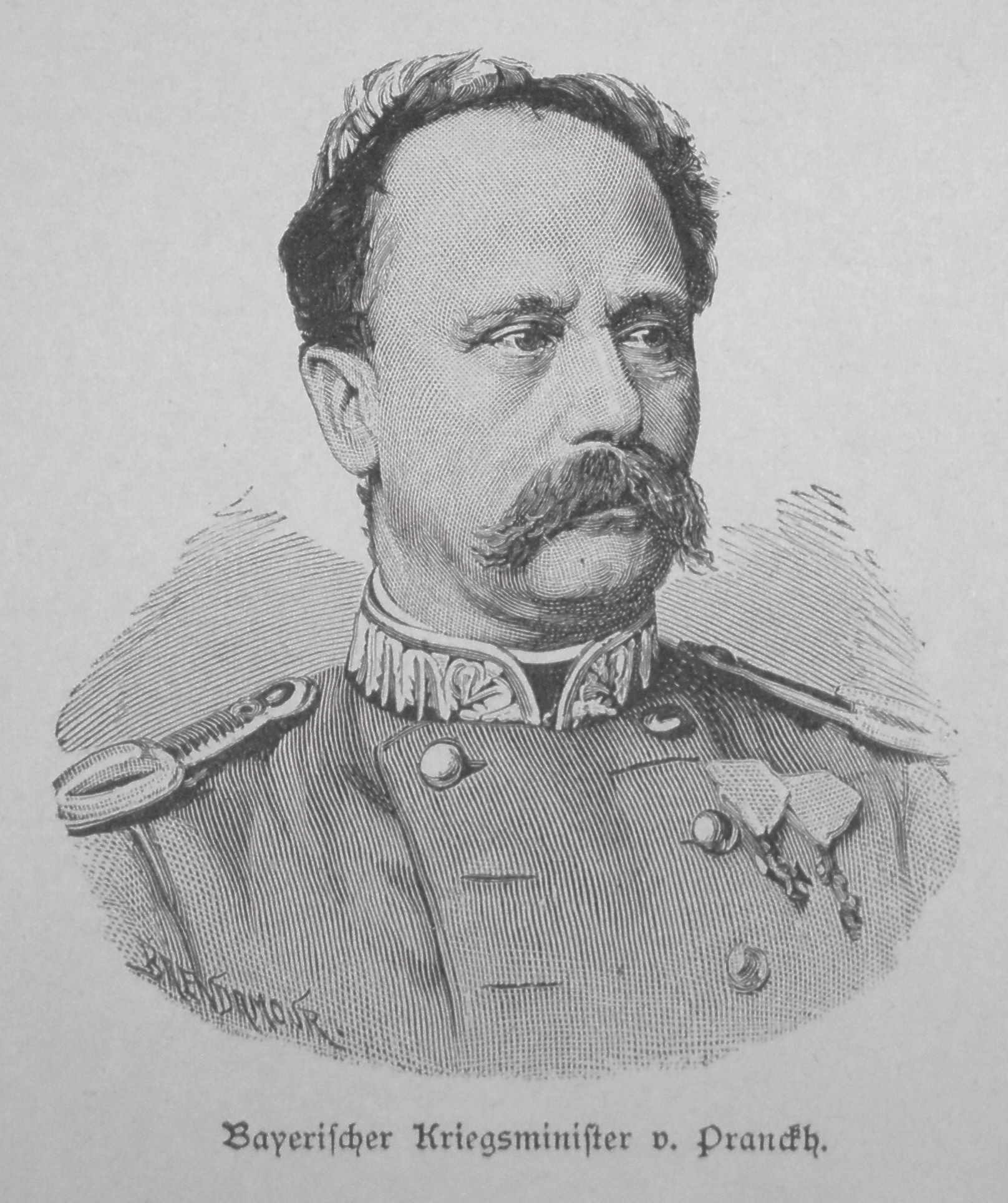
Siegmund Freiherr von Pranckh, Bavarian General and Minister of War

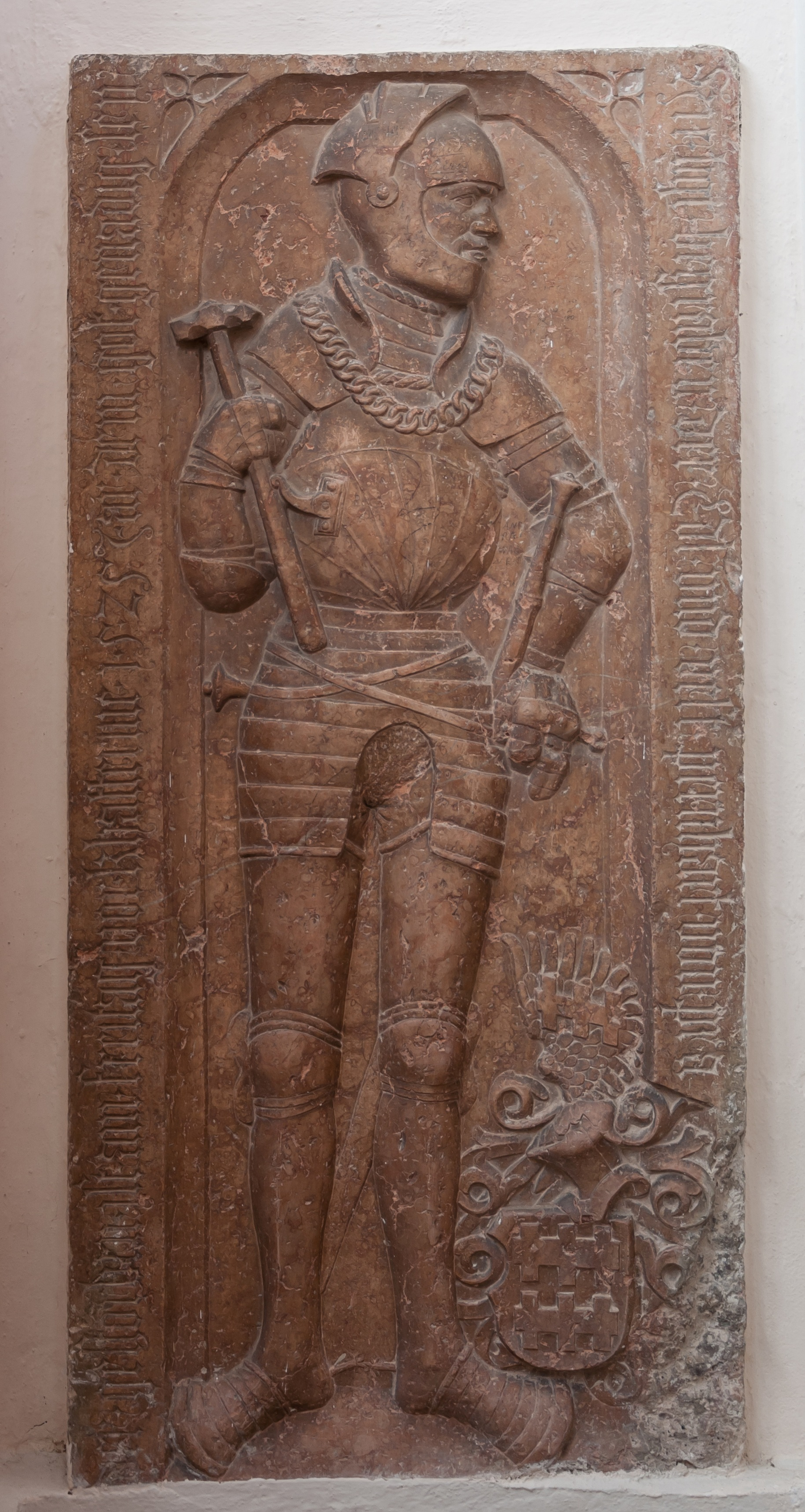
Epitaph of Pernhart von Pranckh in Sankt Johann-Köppling

The Pranckh family is an ancient Austrian noble family, descending from Pranckh Castle, near Sankt Marein bei Knittelfeld in the former March and later Duchy of Styria. The family's origins date back to the year 1135, when Wolfkerus de Branka attested a charter regarding an endowment to Admont Abbey, thus making it one of the oldest families in Austria still present today. In addition to the Styrian mainline, other branches existed in Salzburg, Carinthia, Lower Austria and Bavaria. In later parts of history, the family rose from Knights to Reichsfreiherren (Barons of the Holy Roman Empire) and Reichsgrafen (Imperial Counts of the Holy Roman Empire). Many of their names can be found in high court and state offices of the Archbishopric of Salzburg. Branches of the family exist to this day in Austria, Germany, France and the United States.

== History ==
=== Origins and Styrian line ===
The family traces its origins back to Feistritz bei Knittelfeld in Styria, where it first appeared in documents dated 1135, when Wolfkerus de Branka testified an endowment made by his brother Pilgrim von Feistritz to the Benedictine Abbey of Admont. They were knights of the free nobles of Feistritz-Traisen, which subsequently, under Adalram von Waldeck, a descendant of the Aribonids, founded the Augustinian Abbey of Seckau in 1140, which explains the family's close relationship with Seckau. After their principals had become extinct, they became ministeriales of the territorial lords and provosts of Seckau, among them Arnold, Ortolf, who decreed renovations and new constructions of the Abbey, as well as Ulrich II. von Pranckh. The family crypt was located in Seckau as well, where to this day the red marble tombs of the nobles Johannes Pranckhher von Pranckh and Ernst Pranckhher of Pranckh are preserved.

The continuous succession of the family begins in 1242 with Ulrich von Pranckh. In 1298 the marriage between Friedrich von Pranckh and heiress Anna von Pux, descendant of the Saint Countess Hemma von Gurk was officiated. Anna von Pux brought her coat of arms, estates in Styria and Carinthia and the future ruling seat of the family, the castle of Pux, located at the upper bank of the Mur near Teufenbach. However, the ruling seat was not moved to Pux until 1425. A different part of the family remained in St. Marein, which saw increased invasions of the Turks during these times – they however did not dare to attack the castle of Pranckh.

In 1459, Ernst Pranckhher Knight von Pranckh zu Katsch awarded the Benedictine Admont of Abbey the right to collect tithe and the Zehenthof zu Petersdorf in St. Peter am Kammersberg to further underline the family's relation with the Abbey. Furthermore, the family maintained close relations with the Benedictine Abbey of Göss by for instance providing abbesses.

=== Lower Austrian line ===
The Lower Austrian line of the family was established by Ernst von Pranckh zu Bockfliess, governor of the lower quarter under the Manhartsberg (Weinviertel). Descendants include Eustachius von Pranckh zu Rickersdorf, who acquired the Veste Hof located at the river banks of the March. His son Friedrich von Pranckh later moved the castle to the higher situated location Hofberg and thus laid the foundation of Schloss Hof, later owned by Prince Eugene of Savoy. As the oldest owners of Engelhartstetten, the community where Schloss Hof is located, two mutually crenellated red crossbars of the Lords of Pranckh are shown in the municipal coat of arms.

=== Salzburg line ===
The progenitor of the thriving line is Ulrich von Pranckh († 1416/1420), from whom onwards descending lines are fully established. Closer progenitor is Rupprecht von Pranckh († 1575). His son Roman founded the Salzburg line of the family by marrying Anna Susanna von Überacker, who belonged to Bavarian Uradel. In 1628, Emperor Ferdinand II elevated Johann Christoph Knight von Pranckh, member of the imperial war council and seneschal, Lord of Pux, Poppendorf, Rhine Valley and Frondsberg, together with all blood relatives, to hereditary Barons of the Holy Roman Empire (Reichsfreiherrenstand), and raised to Salzburg state estates in 1651. In 1719, the brothers Ferdinand Josef and Georg Wilhelm, Lord of Schönau, Hallenau and Zinzendorf were raised to Imperial Counts of the Holy Roman Empire (Reichsgrafenstand) by Emperor Charles VI. At the beginning of the 19th century, however, the counts’ line became extinct. In 1765 Leopold Count von Pranckh, colonel and commander of the praiseworthy 2nd Bavarian district regiment, became Lord and Landmann of Salzburg.

=== Bavarian line ===
Siegmund Amadeus Freiherr von Pranckh (* 1768), descendant from the Salzburg branch of the family, following services in the Prince-Archbishopric of Salzburg and Austrian military, relocated his seat to Bavaria where he was appointed royal treasurer and lieutenant colonel. His son Siegmund (* 1821) became the royal Bavarian Minister of War and General and initiated the extensive army reform of 1868. He was also significantly involved in the conclusion of the Treaty of Versailles in 1870 and was granted an endowment of 100,000 crowns from the war compensation awards for his achievements. In 1873 he returned to Styria to take over the allodial entailed rule Pux from Ludwig († 1880), the last descendant of the Styrian line at the time.

== Estates and rulership ==
The reach of the family Pranckh primarily covered the upper valley of the Mur. Besides castle Pranckh and castle Pux, they controlled the following sites in Styria:

- Altenhofen
- Birkenstein
- Dornhofen
- Eppenstein
- Feistritz am Kammersberg
- Fohnsdorf
- Friedhofen
- Frojach
- Frondsberg
- Gabelhofen (Riegersdorf)
- Gilgenbühel
- Goppelsbach
- Grubenhof bei Graz
- Grubhof bei Judenburg
- Gutenhag
- Hautzenbichl
- Hohenburg
- Karlsberg
- Katsch
- Kohlsberg
- Luegg
- Oberdorf
- Oberlorenzen
- Pachern
- Perchau am Sattel
- Pichlhofen
- Plankenwarth
- Poppendorf
- Prankerhof (Adelsbühel)
- Rachau
- Reifenstein
- Reinthal
- Rothenfels bei Oberwölz
- Schallaun
- Schrattenberg
- Siegersdorf bei Herberstein
- Schloss Sonneck (St. Bartholomä) (Buschenschlössl)
- Waldstein (Alt-Waldstein)
- Waldstein (Deutschfeistritz)
- Wartberg (Liechtenegg)
- Wasserleith

Upper Austria:

- Feldegg
- Oberalm
- Schieferegg
- Waikhartsberg

Lower Austria:

- Bockfließ
- Engelhartstetten
- Grafenweiden
- Markthof
- Niederweiden
- Schloss Hof
- Schönau

Salzburg:

- Aigen
- Baron-Pranckh Haus at Sigmund-Haffner-Gasse
- Eichen
- Haunsperg
- Prenzingerau
- Reiterhaus at Getreidegasse
- Seeburg
- Ursprung
- Wiespach

Vienna:

- Laudon

Slovenia:

- Snežnik Castle

=== Current estates ===
As of today, the castles Pux, Hautzenbichl and Windern as well as the former cave castles Schallaun and Luegg also known as Puxerloch, are privately owned by the family.

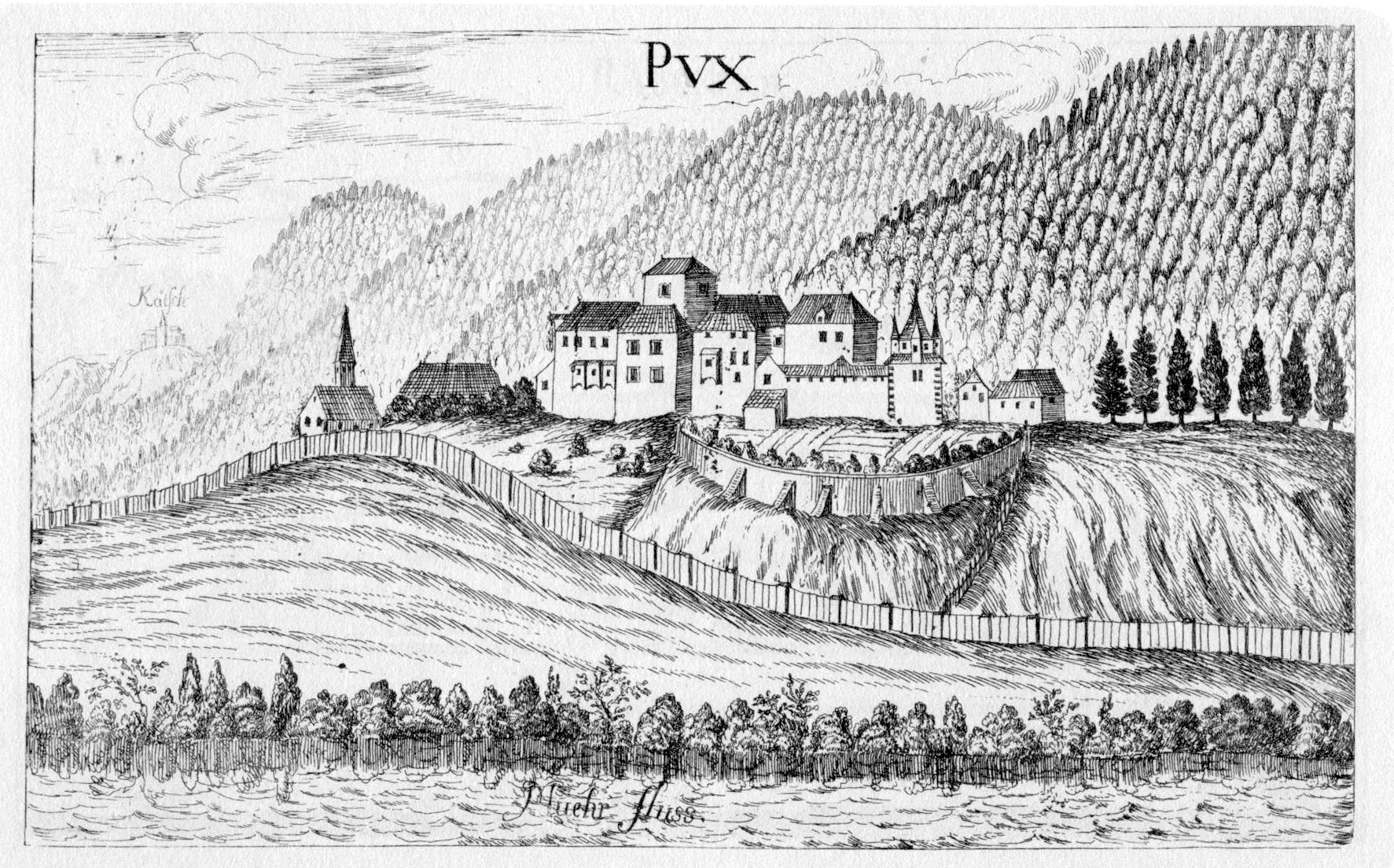
Pux

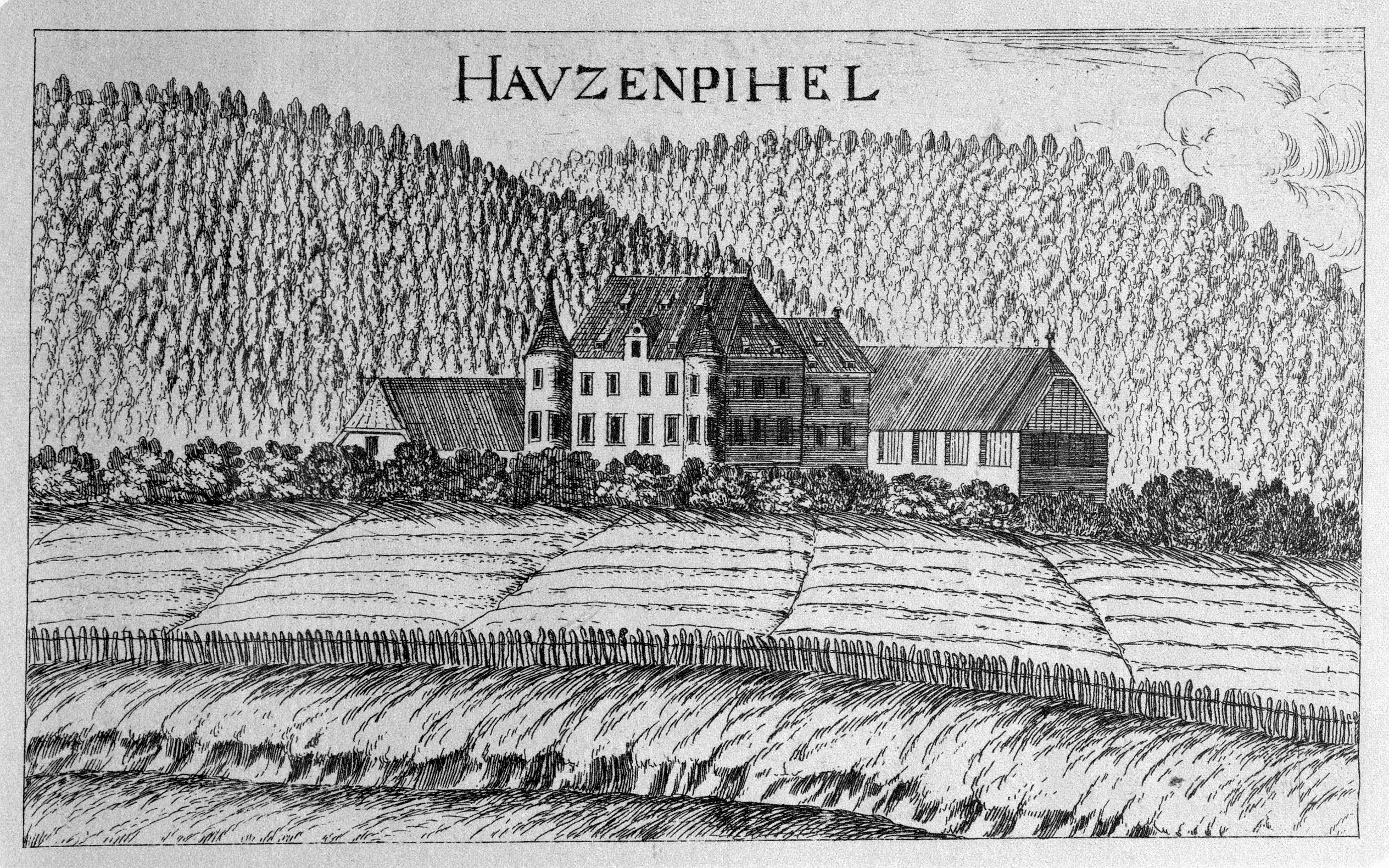
Hautzenbichl

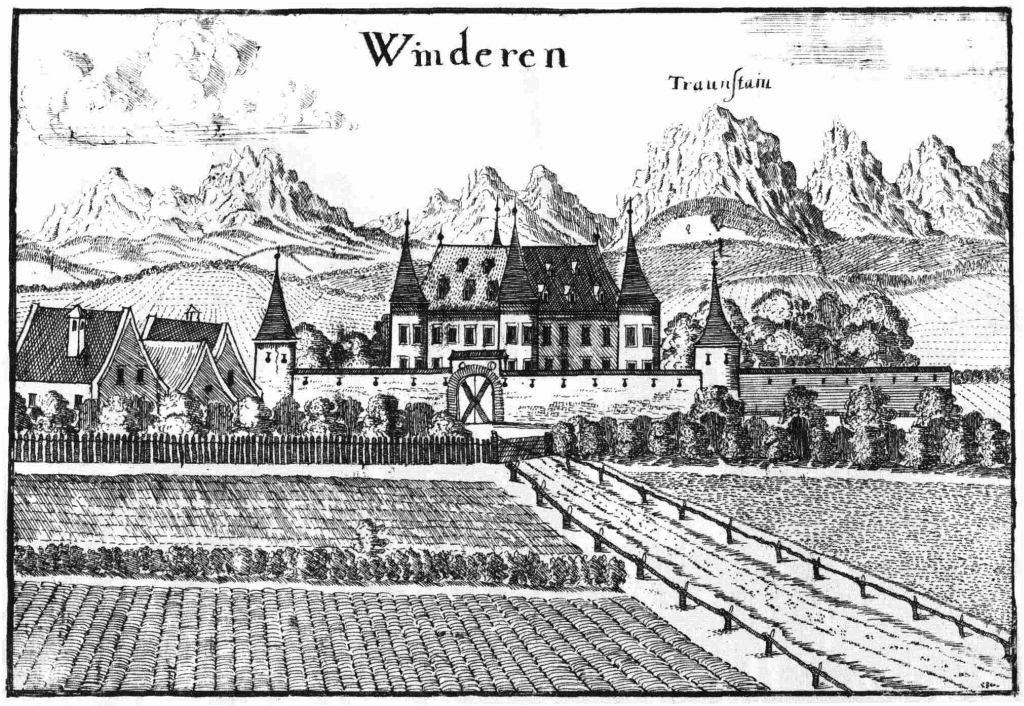
Windern

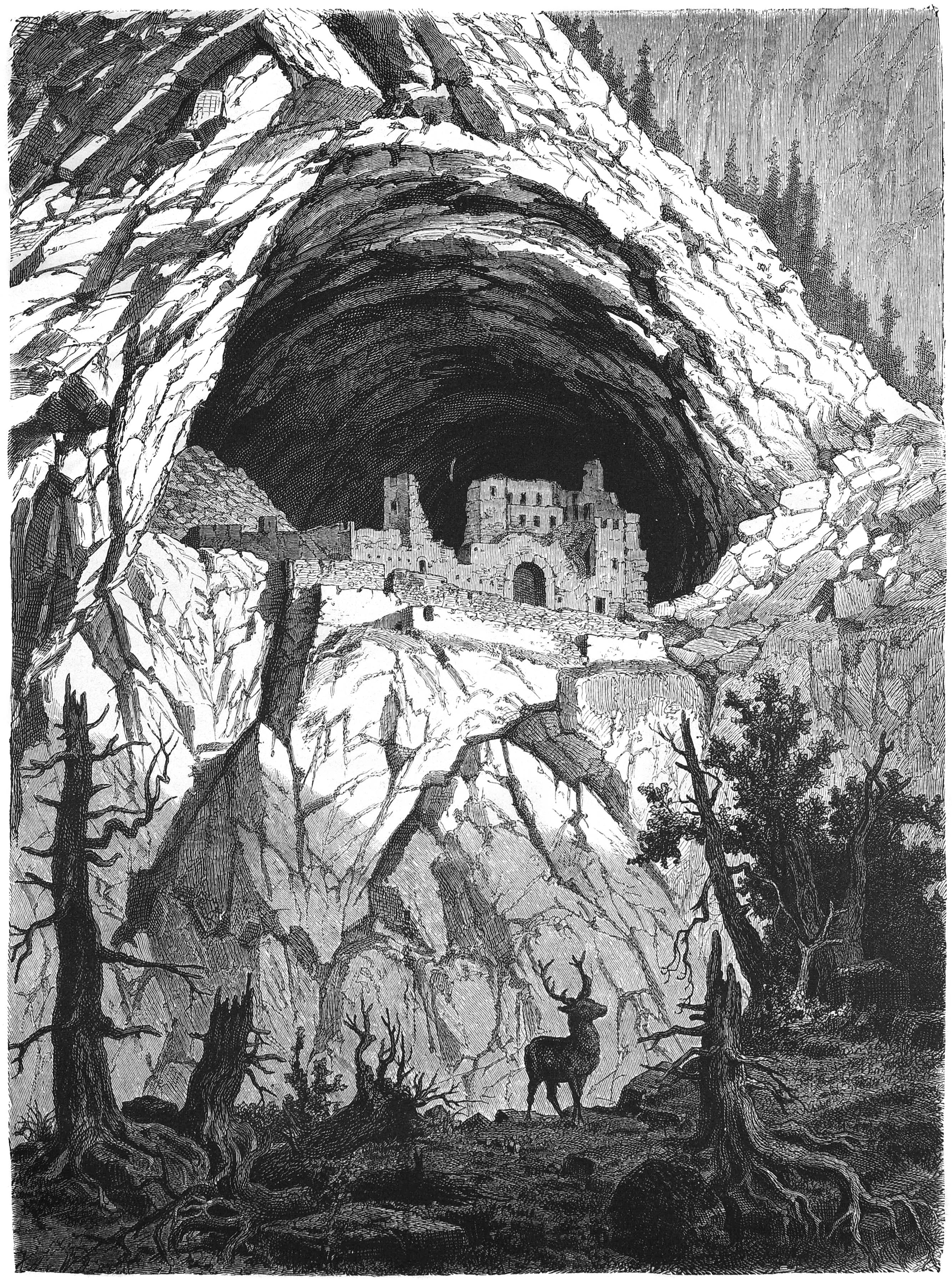
Schallaun and Luegg

== Coat of arms ==
The initial coat of arms of Pranckh shows two crenellated cross-beams in silver. The crest consists of red and-silver mantling with a pair of red horns on the right and a pair of silver horns left, which on their outsides are crested with colour-changing combs.

The coat of arms of the Barons von Pranckh zu Pux was formed by the marriage between Friedrich von Pranckh and Anna von Pux, and officiated by Emperor Ferdinand II. in 1628. The coat arms is quartered and shows the baronial crown. Fields one and four show the original coat of arms, with two crenellated cross-beams in silver against a red background. Fields two and three show three slanted spearheads in silver (the boar spears of the von Pux family) against red background. The first helmet shows the original crest of Pranckh, with red and silver mantling, a pair of buffalo horns, red on the right and silver on the left, with black tufts of feathers on the outside. The second helmet represents the Pux family and shows a closed vol in red with three slanted spearheads in silver over red-silver mantling.

The coat of arms of the Counts von Pranckh zu Pux is quartered, with the initial coat of arms of Pranckh embedded as heart-shaped escutcheon and the comital crown on top. Fields one and four show three slanted spearheads of Pux in silver against red background. Fields two and three show the coat of arms of Colaus, halved diagonally in red and silver. On top are three crowned helmets with red and silver mantling. The first helmet of Pux shows a closed vol in red with three slanted spearheads in silver. The central helmet of Pranckh shows a pair of red and silver buffalo horns with black tufts of feathers on the outside. The third helmet of Colaus is decorated with three ostrich feathers in red-silver-red.

=== Historical coat of arms ===
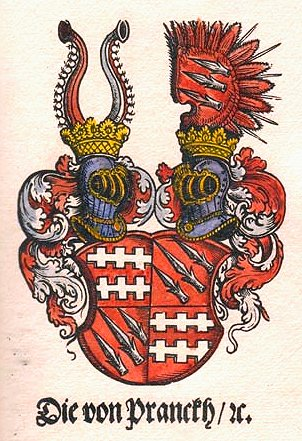
Pranckh zu Pux coat of arms (Styrian Roll of Arms, 1567)

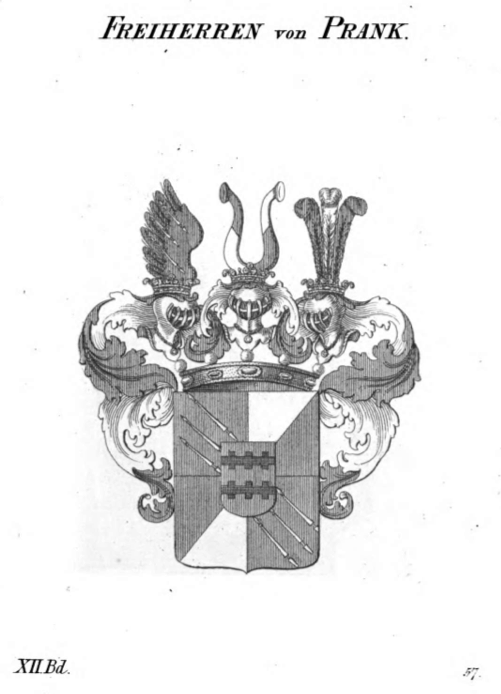
Barons von Pranckh zu Pux coat of arms (Austrian Monarchy Roll of Arms, 1840)

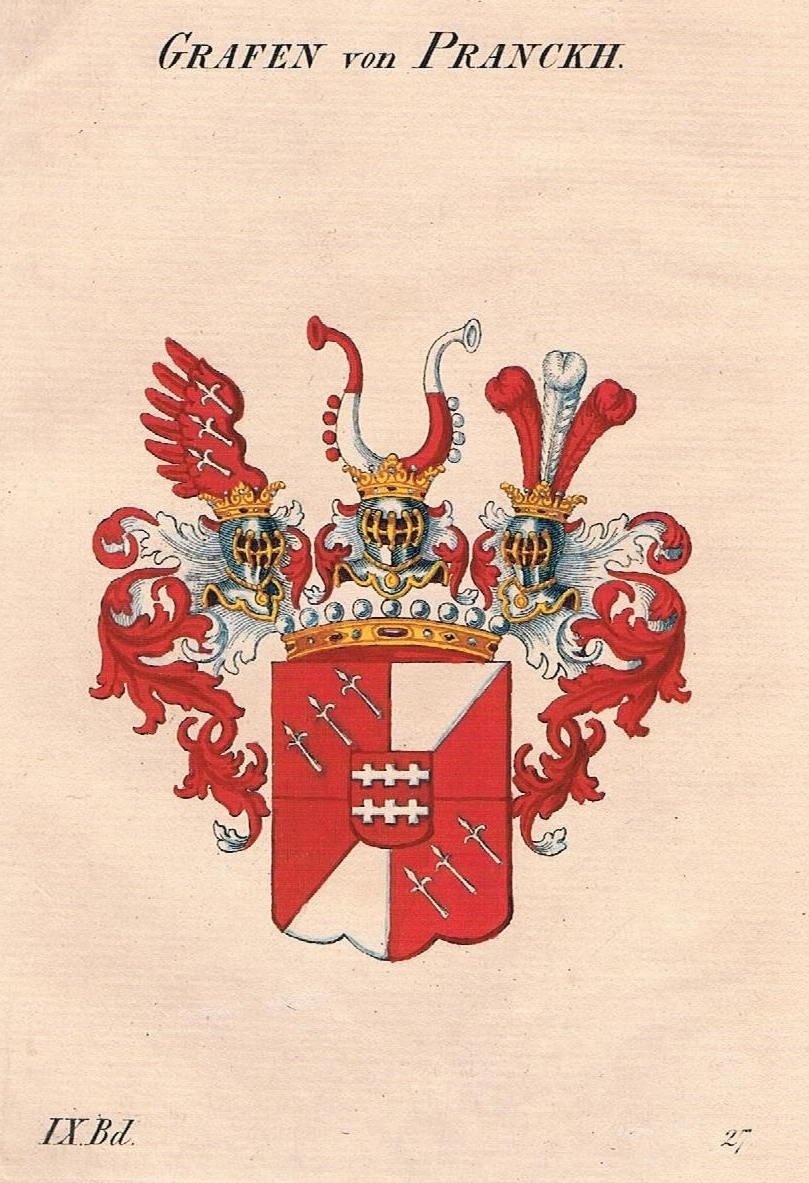
Counts von Pranckh zu Pux coat of arms (Austrian Monarchy Roll of Arms, 1837)

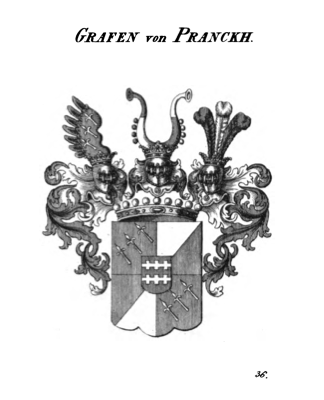
Counts von Pranckh zu Pux coat of arms (Roll of arms of royal and comital houses of the Austrian Monarchy, 1856)

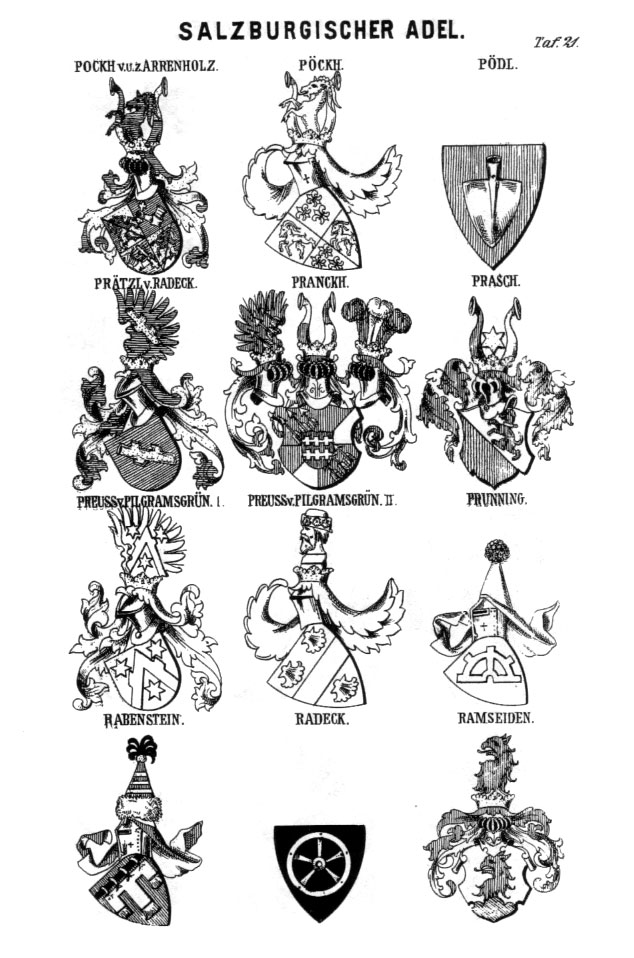
Counts von Pranckh zu Pux coat of arms (Siebmacher's Roll of Arms of Salzburg Nobility, 1883)

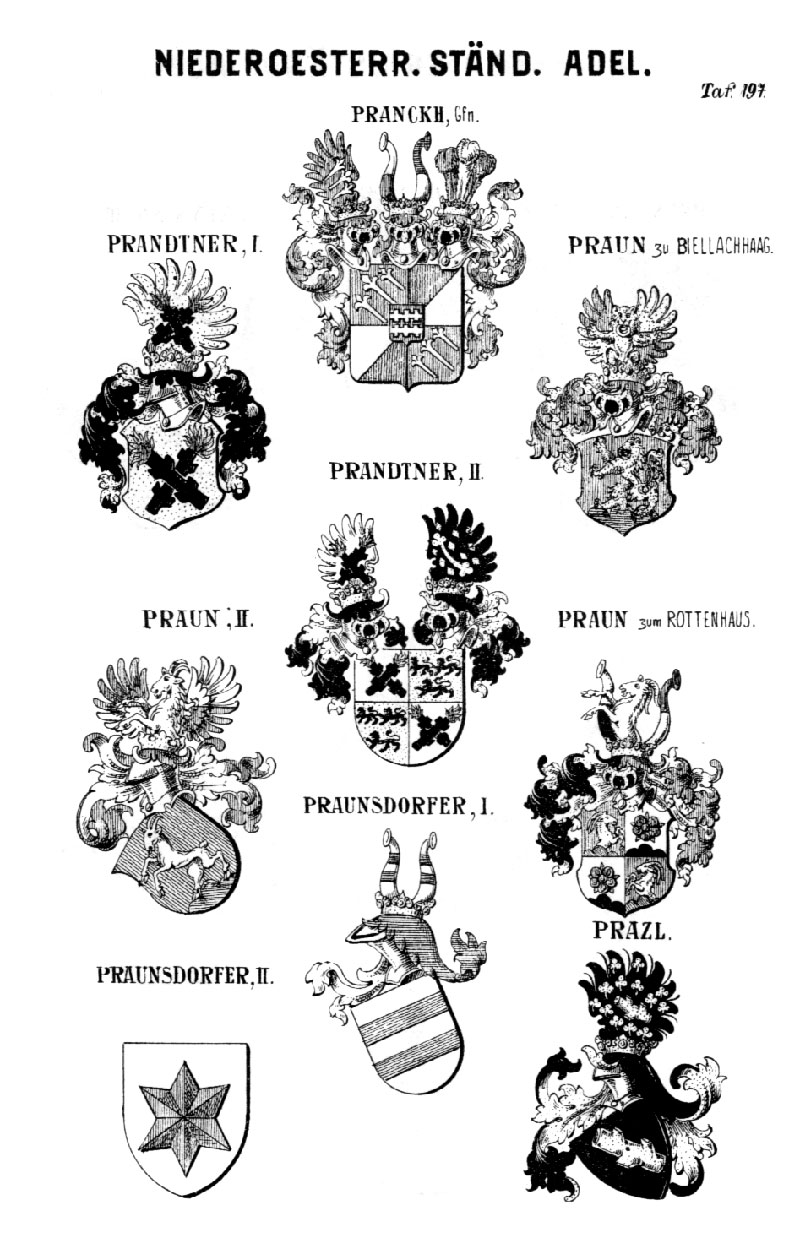
Counts von Pranckh zu Pux coat of arms (Siebmacher's Roll of Arms of Lower Austrian Nobility, 1918)

=== Local coat of arms ===
Coat of arms of Engelhartstetten

== Burial helmet of Pranckh ==
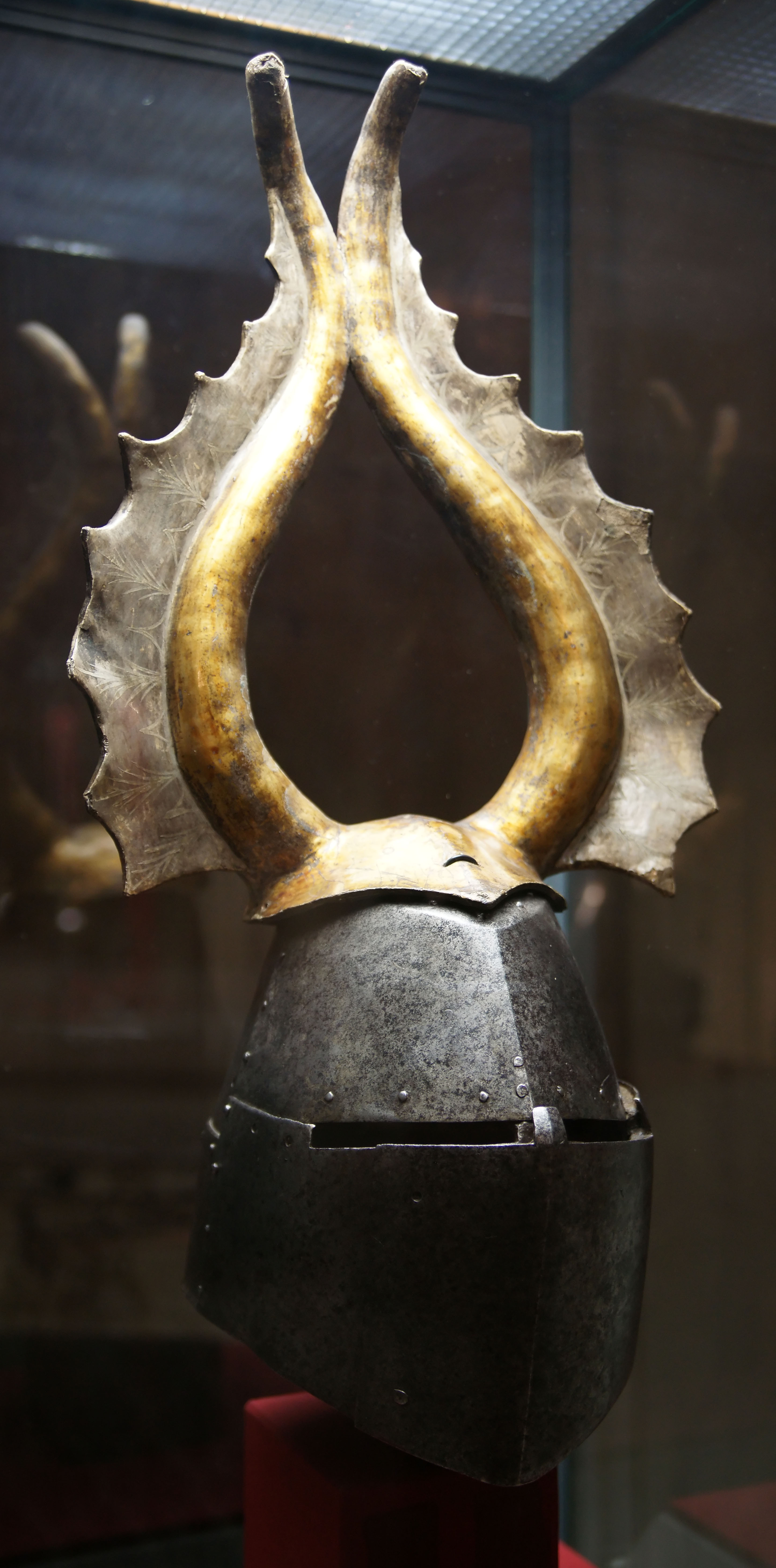
Burial helmet of the Pranckh family

The burial helmet of the family of Pranckh is one of the most famous crested medieval bucket helmets, the only other existing specimen is the one from the Black Prince of Canterbury. The helmet was likely to be used during tournaments, as its additional front reinforcements suggest. Presumably, it belonged to Albert von Pranckh, who carried an almost identical helmet in his coat of arms, and dates back to the first half of the 14th century. The crest shows a golden pair of buffalo horns, embellished with silver outer ridges, covered in leather. Following a crusade, it was donated to the Abbey of Seckau, where it hung with two funerary hatchments over the family crypt of Pranckh. In 1878 it was acquired for the imperial collection in Vienna and is currently on display at the armoury of the Kunsthistorisches Museum in Vienna.

== People ==
- Eustachius von Pranckh zu Rickersdorf (16th century), Lord on Schloss Hof and Markthof in Lower Austria
- Friedrich von Pranckh zu Rickersdorf (ca. 1620), Lord on Schloss Hof, Markthof, Grafenweiden and Niederweiden in Lower Austria; founder of Schloss Hof
- Adam Gottlieb von Pranckh (ca. 1647), Baron on Seeburg in Seekirchen am Wallersee, Salzburg
- Siegmund von Pranckh (1821–1888), Bavarian General and Minister of War
- Hans von Pranckh (1888–1945), Bavarian Officer, Baron on Pux in Styria and Austrian Heimwehrführer
- Pilgrim von Pranckh (1923–2013), Baron on Hautzenbichl in Styria
- Georg von Pranckh (1926-2005), Austrian politician (ÖVP)
- Georg von Pranckh (* 1952), Austrian politician (FPÖ)
- Pilgrim von Pranckh (* 1955), Baron on Pux in Styria

== Literature ==
- Genealogical Handbook of Nobility, Adelslexikon Edition X, Edition 119 of the series, pp. 521–522, C. A. Starke Verlag, Limburg (Lahn) 1999, ISSN 0435-2408
- Genealogical Handbook of Bavarian Nobility, Editions I-XXIX, Vereinigung des Adels in Bayern e.V. | Bayerisches Adelsarchiv e.V., 1950–2009 [Edition/Page]: 1/569, 3/477, 6/280, 11/306, 15/348, 19/408, 23/419, 27/479
- Almanach de Gotha of Baronial Houses. Justus Perthes, Gotha. 1896, 1898, 1904, 1906, 1956, 1986.
- Almanach de Gotha of Comital Houses. Justus Perthes, Gotha. 1874.
