= Ruine Puxerloch =

Pair of cave castles in Styria, Austria

Coordinates: 47°08′16″N 14°20′54″E

- Styria, Austria
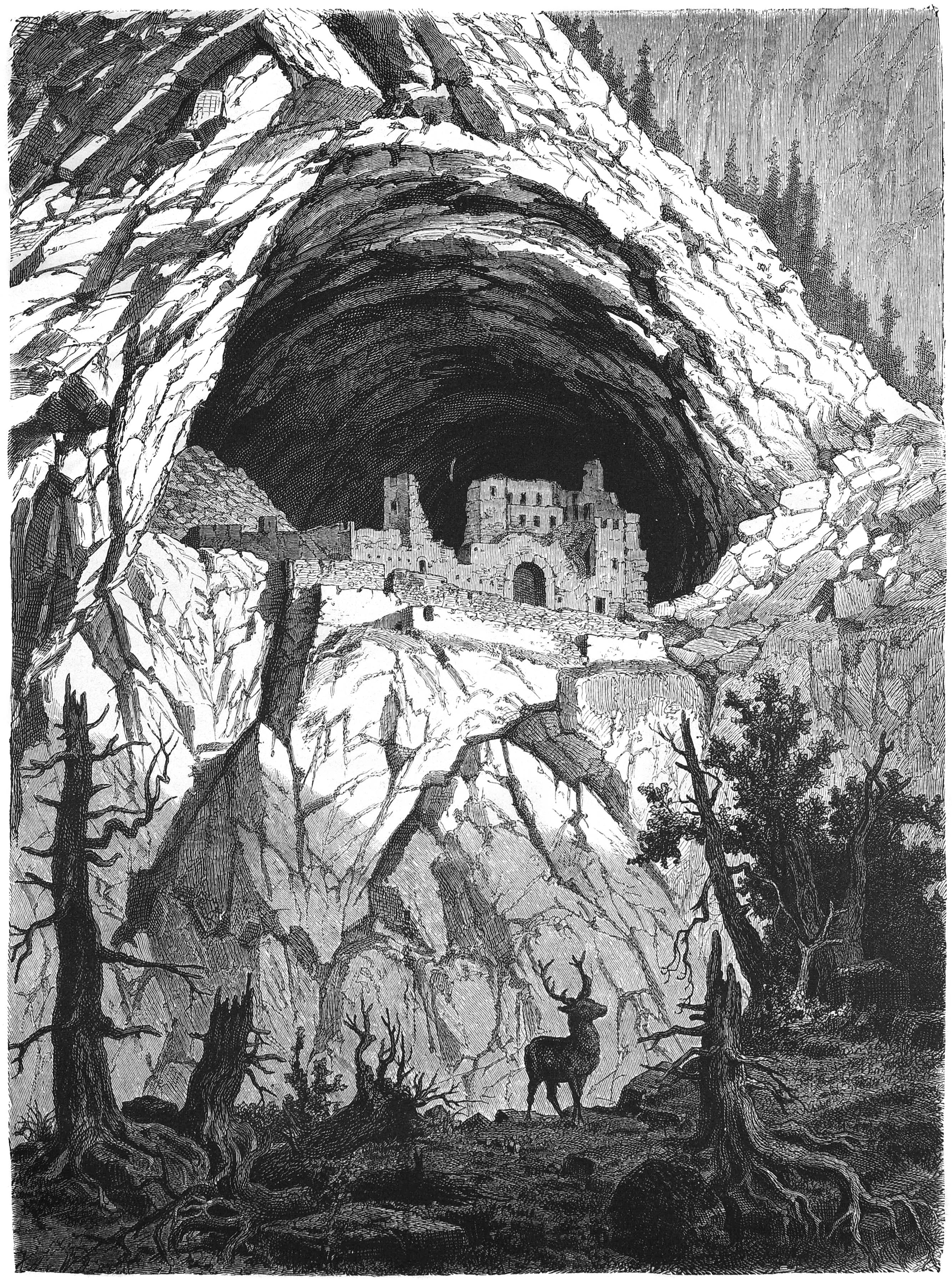

Site information
- Type: Cave castle
- Owner: Pranckh
- Open to the public: yes
- Condition: Ruin

Site history
- Built: first mentioned in 1181

Puxerloch is the local name for a pair of adjacent medieval Höhlenburgen (cave castles) – Burg Luegg and Burg Schallaun, on the Pleschaitz mountain near Teufenbach-Katsch in the Murau district of Styria, Austria. The site lies on the nearly vertical Puxer Wand cliff overlooking the Mur River valley, at roughly 900–950 m above sea level. Both castles occupy natural caves in the limestone cliff, the larger western cave (Luegg) and a smaller cave about 50–70 m to its west (Schallaun). They are among only a handful of surviving cave castles in Austria.

== History ==
The caves were fortified in the High Middle Ages and first enter the historical record in 1181 as Schalun (Schallaun) Castle, named for Machward of Schalun. Burg Luegg was likely built at the same time by the local Lueger family. Throughout the late medieval period both castles changed hands among Styrian nobility. Schallaun was owned by a family related to the Lords of Saurau and was sold to the Liechtenstein family in 1472. In 1481–1490 Schallaun was occupied by Hungarian troops during King Matthias Corvinus’s campaigns, Emperor Frederick III later returned it to the Liechtensteins. Meanwhile Luegg had become a fief of the Counts of Cilli in the 15th century, with parts held by the local Puxer and Teufenbacher families. After the extinction of the Cilli line in 1456 the Teufenbacher lords continued as feudatories into the 17th century. Both castles passed by inheritance or sale into the Pranckh (Pux) family, who retained them as part of their estates.

From the 16th century onward the cave castles fell into decline. Luegg was probably abandoned by the 1600s as the difficult access and cramped conditions made permanent residence impractical. By the 18th century both sites were ruins, Hungarians had “cleared” the caves in 1769 and caused further damage. Legend suggest that in the early 19th century a gang of robbers took refuge in the Puxerloch caves, the authorities reportedly destroyed much of the remaining masonry by explosion to evict them. Nevertheless, the larger Luegg cave was still described as partially habitable into the 19th century. Today both ruins (and nearby Schloss Pux) remain private property of the Pranckh family.

== Site and architecture ==
Burg Luegg and Burg Schallaun occupy two natural caverns high on the cliff. An outer defensive terrace (now overgrown) lies immediately below each cave. Access to Luegg is via a steep forest path and wooden ladders leading up about 100 m above the valley road. The entrance to Luegg is a roughly rectangular portal about 40 m wide and 40 m high. Within the cave, a massive cross-wall (the “Vorwand”) originally sealed off the inner chambers, portions of this wall survive, built of roughly 12th–13th century masonry. The interior was divided into courtyards and rooms, now largely collapsed to foundations. Archaeological surveys note only sparse remains (wall fragments and floor debris), along with beam sockets and painted plaster that mark where the multi-story residential buildings once stood. A natural spring in the cave supplied water to the inhabitants.

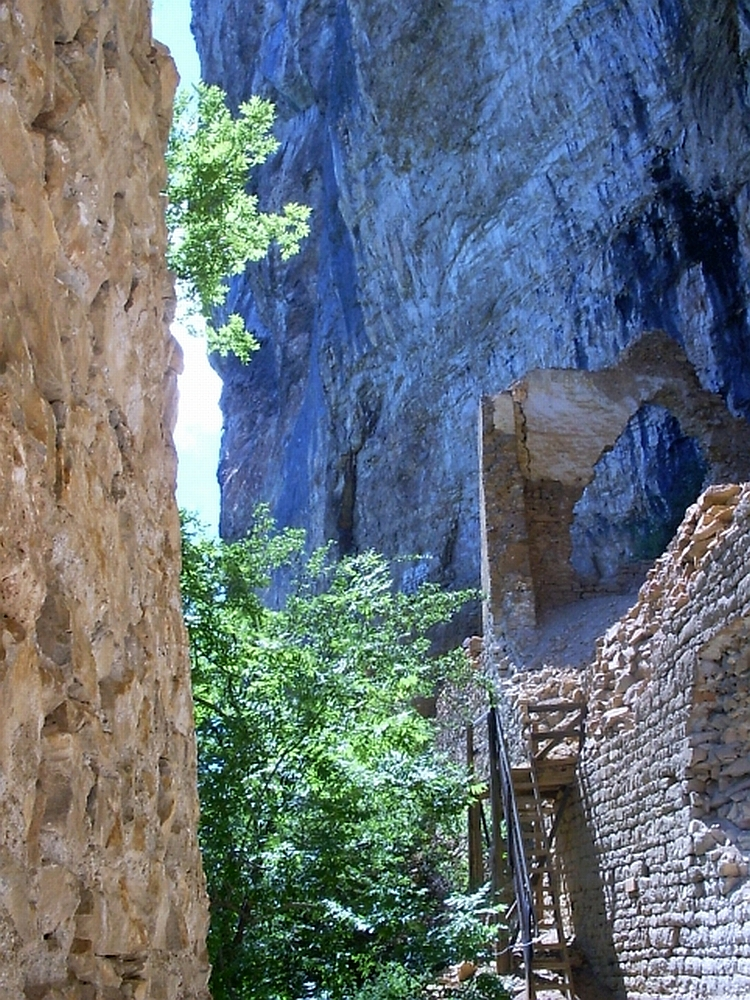
Staircase ruin

Schallaun Castle, in the smaller western cave about 10–15 m below Luegg, was similarly built against the rock. It has a narrow entrance (formerly reached by ladder or steep path) and was once linked to Luegg by a wooden bridge or walk, though no trace of such a structure survives. The inner chamber of Schallaun is about 28 m wide and contains the ruins of a small three-storey dwelling, the second-floor joist holes are still visible in the walls. Both caves had only one approach, making them defensible. According to legend, Luegg’s outer courtyard could be locked by a gate and barricade wall (a Sperrmauer), this indeed seems to have existed in the high entrance passage. By the 19th century all underground passages and chambers had been extensively damaged, modern sources note that despite local tales of hidden tunnels, no secret passage connecting the two caves has been found.

== Legends and cultural significance ==
Puxerloch is associated with several local legends. One popular saga recounts that during the reign of Charlemagne, a young knight named Charlot von Chalon eloped with a captured Saxon princess and took refuge in the Schallaun cave. There he is said to have built the castle and married one sister, founding a line of Raubritter (robber knights) in the valley. Another folk tale tells of a “man without a shadow” who was cursed and hid within Schallaun, emerging on dark nights to abduct maidens. These and other stories (such as local variants involving the emperor’s daughter or the legendary Carinthian Duchess Guta Maultasch) were recorded in 19th-century Steirian collections. While the tales are of uncertain origin, they reflect the site's role in local folklore. Today, the site is listed as a cultural monument in the municipality of Teufenbach-Katsch, appears in regional castle guides, and is protected as a historical structure of local significance.

== Conservation and access ==
Both cave ruins are legally protected. They are listed as a “Baudenkmal” (cultural heritage monument) in Styria (BDA no. 36937), the cliffs are part of a designated protected landscape area. The remains are unstable, and only Luegg is normally reachable without climbing gear. A marked trail leads from the Mur river road up to Luegg’s entrance (a 20–30 minute hike with ladders and stairs), and it can be visited by experienced hikers. Visitors must exercise care on the slippery, unguarded stairways. By contrast, Schallaun’s cave lies beyond a vertical wall and is effectively closed to the public without technical climbing equipment. There are no visitor facilities or interpretation at the site. Ongoing preservation is minimal, the ruins remain largely as found, with only occasional maintenance to the access steps.

== Archaeological notes ==
Little formal archaeological excavation has been reported at Puxerloch. The site is mostly known from structural surveys and historical records. Scholars have noted its rarity, Austrian studies count only about ten cave castles or ruins in the country, and Puxerloch (Luegg/Schallaun) is the most famous example in Styria, Austria. For example, a survey by E.C. Nøller in 1966 and later research pointed out that no trace of the legendary passage between the caves was found, and that the wall masonry appears to date to the 12th–14th centuries. What survives is mostly architectural the castle walls, terraces, and flooring, rather than movable artifacts. The rarity and defensive ingenuity of the cave castles continue to make them a subject of interest in regional medieval studies.

== See also ==
- List of castles in Austria
- House of Lichtenstein
- Pranckh Noble Family
