= Teufenbach =

- Former municipality
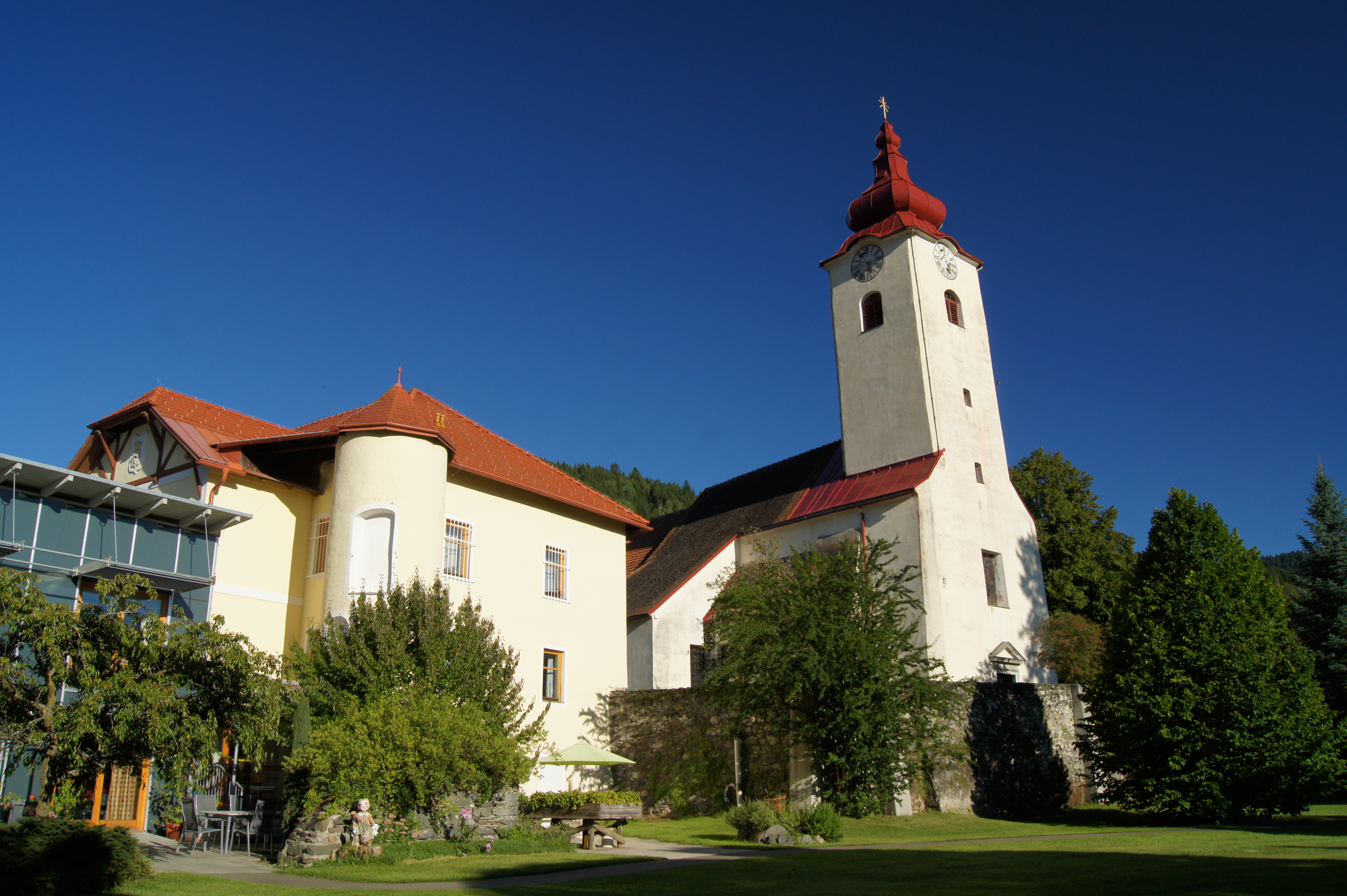
- Neu-Teuffenbach Castle

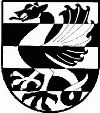
- Coat of arms

- Location within Austria
- Coordinates: 47°07′43″N 14°21′32″E
- Country: Austria
- State: Styria
- District: Murau

Area
  - Total: 3.43 km^{2} (1.32 sq mi)
- Elevation: 760 m (2,490 ft)

Population (1 January 2016)
  - Total: 687
  - Density: 200/km^{2} (519/sq mi)
- Time zone: UTC+1 (CET)
  - Summer (DST): UTC+2 (CEST)
- Postal code: 8833
- Area code: 03582
- Vehicle registration: MU
- Website: www.teufenbach.at

Teufenbach is a former municipality in the district of Murau in the Austrian state of Styria. Since the 2015 Styria municipal structural reform, it is part of the municipality Teufenbach-Katsch.

== Geography ==
Teufenbach lies in the upper valley of the Mur.
