= Siegmund von Pranckh =

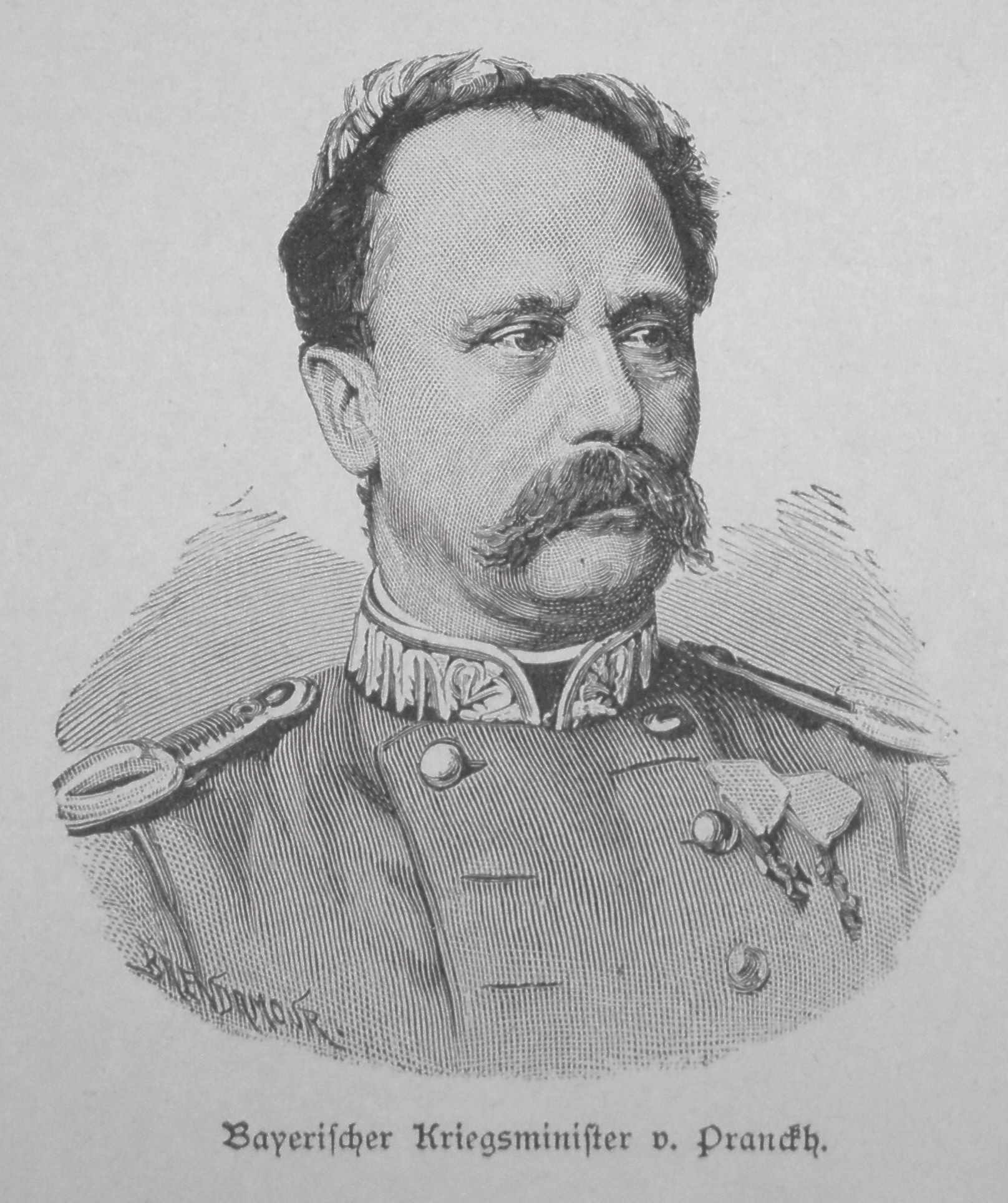
- Born: 5 December 1821; Altötting, Upper Bavaria
- Died: 8 May 1888 (aged 66); Munich
- Burial place: Alter Südfriedhof
- Military career
- Allegiance: Kingdom of Bavaria
- Rank: General der Infanterie

Siegmund Freiherr von Pranckh (5 December 1821, Altötting, Upper Bavaria – 8 May 1888, Munich), descendant of the ancient Austrian noble family Pranckh, originally residentiary in the former March and later Duchy of Styria, was a Bavarian general and Minister of War.

== Life ==
Pranckh was born in upper Bavaria, as a son of a lieutenant colonel of the Bavarian Army. Pranckh joined the army in Munich in 1840, being in the cadet corps before, and in 1849 (having risen to captain) worked on the staff of the Generalquartiermeister. He remained in the War Department until 1863 before becoming Oberst of the 3rd Infantry Regiment; and then in 1865 of the Lifeguards Regiment. With the latter he would serve in the Austro-Prussian War, participating in the Battle of Kissingen and the storming of Nüdlingen. After the war, Ludwig II chose Pranckh as new Minister of War, disregarding the advice of all the Bavarian generals. Shortly afterwards Pranckh reorganised the Bavarian Army. He overhauled the conscription and replacement system, introduced the modern M1869 Werder Rifle, and changed military training and education. This helped the Bavarian Army to be ready for the Franco-Prussian War.

Immediately after the outbreak of the Franco-Prussian War he was promoted to Lieutenant General, and prudently and effectively organized the Bavarian Army and its munitions after it had suffered considerable losses. He was also significantly involved in the conclusion of the Treaty of Versailles on 23 November 1870. For his achievements he was granted an endowment of 100,000 Thaler and was honored on the Angel of Peace monument.

In 1872 Pranckh initiated a further army reform. In early 1875 he was appointed General der Infanterie and on 4 April 1875 appointed captain-general of the ceremonial Hartschier Guards. On his own request he was released from leading the war ministry in 1876.

He is buried in the Old Southern Cemetery in Munich.

Government offices
Preceded by Eduard Freiherr von Rotberg (acting)	Ministers of War (Bavaria); 1866–1875	Succeeded by Joseph Maximilian Fridolin Ritter von Maillinger
