= Royal Bavarian Life Guards =

Bavarian Army regiment

Royal Bavarian Infantry Life Guard Regiment Grenadier Guards Regiment
- Königlich Bayerisches Infanterie-Leib-Regiment
- Active: 1814 – 1918
- Country: Kingdom of Bavaria; German Empire
- Allegiance: Kingdom of Bavaria; German Empire
- Branch: Royal Bavarian Army; Imperial German Army
- Type: Life Guard
- Size: Regiment
- Garrison/HQ: Munich
- Engagements: Napoleonic Wars: Hundred Days; Austro-Prussian War; Franco-Prussian War; World War I

Commanders
- Notable commanders: Siegmund von Pranckh; Carl von Horn; Felix Graf von Bothmer; Franz Ritter von Epp

The Royal Bavarian Infantry Life Guard Regiment (German: Königlich Bayerisches Infanterie-Leib-Regiment) was a military unit established in Bavaria in 1814. It was a household, life guard (bodyguard) regiment of the King of Bavaria from the end of the Napoleonic Wars until the fall of the Wittelsbach monarchy in Bavaria following World War I, and the subsequent disbanding of the Bavarian Army.

In recent years, the regiment has been honored in an annual memorial day organised by the Bavarian state government.

== Predecessors ==
Before the regiment of Life Guards was formed, two infantry regiments of the Bavarian Army held the title of 'King's' (König): from 1684 to 1778, the unit that later became the Royal Bavarian Infantry Regiment No. 10 ("König Ludwig") and from 1778 to 1811, the unit that later became the Royal Bavarian Infantry Regiment No. 1 ("König").

== History ==
=== Creation ===
The regiment was created by Royal Decree on 16 July 1814 as the Grenadier Guards Regiment from the grenadier companies of Bavarian line infantry regiments. The tallest men were transferred to the Grenadier Guards Regiment, the rest to the "King's Own" (König) Royal Bavarian Infantry Regiment No. 1. The regiment consisted of 3 battalions of 6 companies each. The first Colonel Commandant (after 1872, the term "commander" was used) was Franz Freiherr von Hertling, who was in command until 11 February 1824. On 13 April 1815 the regiment received its colours in Munich.

A field battalion was established from all battalions on 14 April 1815 and deployed for guard duties under the 6th Royal Bavarian Reserve Infantry Brigade in Mannheim and Auxerre. After the armistice, the 2nd and 3rd battalion were transferred to Auxerre. On 22 September 1815 the colours were blessed in the cathedral of Auxerres.

The regiment's garrison city was generally Munich, at times individual battalions of the regiment were stationed elsewhere (1st battalion 1851–1853 in Germersheim, 1862 in Landau; 2nd battalion 1853 in Landau, 1859 in Landsberg, 1871 in Augsburg; 3rd battalion 1873 in Fürstenfeldbruck).

Immediately after the death of Maximilian I Joseph, his son and heir Ludwig I decreed the abolition of the expensive Guard regiments. The regiment from 6 December 1825 held the name "Line Infantry Life Guard Regiment", consisting of 2 battalions of 6 companies each (20 to 30 soldiers to a company). From 28 October 1835 it was named the "Infantry Life Guard Regiment", without a regimental number, it stood at the head of the infantry in the order of precedence. In practice, however, it maintained its "Guard" status. Quickly, "life guards" (Leiber) became a nickname for members of the Regiment.

In 1848 the 3rd battalion was re-established. The regiment was placed on high alert on 4 April 1848 during the confusion of the Revolution, and took up positions in front of the ruler's residence. On 30 June 1848, the first commoner, Jakob Ermarth, was appointed Colonel-Commandant. The 1st and 2nd battalions were transferred on 5 October 1848 to Sigmaringen in Marsch, to protect Charles, Prince of Hohenzollern-Sigmaringen and to depose the provisional government there. After similar deployments under an "observation corps" in the area of Ulm and Günzburg, the battalions returned by 31 December 1849 to Munich. For the regiment's 50th anniversary on 16 July 1864, its officers and the Colonel-Commandant Karl Graf von Spreti held a banquet in the Hotel Vier Jahreszeiten in Munich, and its non-commissioned officers and enlisted ranks received an allowance of 500 guilders from King Ludwig II, and 100 guilders from Prince Otto.

=== War against Prussia ===
In 1866 in the Austro-Prussian War, with Bavaria fighting on the Austrian side, the regiment was not deployed as a whole; the I battalion was stationed in the fortress of Mainz, whilst the II and III battalions, under Colonel Siegmund von Pranckh, were assigned to the 1st Royal Bavarian Infantry Brigade. After 4 battles, the regiment counted 17 dead and 136 wounded, with the Colonel having been replaced, unusually, by the non-aristocratic Adalbert Högenstaller already after the first of these battles (at Nüdlingen).

=== Franco-Prussian War ===
In the Franco-Prussian War the whole regiment was assigned to the 1st Brigade, and thus to the 1st Division. At Lechfeld, it counted 66 officers and 2879 men ready for action. In the battles of Wörth on 6 August 1870 and Sedan on 1 September the regiment was at the centre of the fighting and suffered a few casualties. For the actions at Sedan the commander of the III battalion, Major Joseph Graf von Ioner-Tettenweiß, was awarded the Knight's Cross of the Military Order of Max Joseph. After the battle at Artenay on 10 October 1870 the regiment occupied Orléans on 11 October, but had to give it up again on 9 November 1870 in the face of far superior French forces, the Armée de la Loire. The cautious but brave actions of Captain Karl Hoffmann, head of the 9th Company of the regiment, in the Battle of Villepion on 1 December 1870 prevented a breakthrough by superior French units, and held the endangered position until the end of that day. He was also awarded the Knight's Cross of the Military Order of Max Joseph. On 2 December 1870, the regiment proved itself in the bloody Battle of Loigny-Poupry, for which First Lieutenant Hermann Ehrne von Melchthal (8th Company) received a Knight's Cross for bravery in the face of the enemy. The regiment recaptured Orléans the following day. On 7 December 1870 Second Lieutenant Friedrich Krieger, head of the 11th Company, repelled an attack by superior French forces on an artillery unit at Lemons (near Meung) and engaged in a counter-attack on his own initiative. He pursued and captured numerous French soldiers and an enemy artillery battery; for this he received a Knight's Cross. On the same day Second Lieutenant Alfred Meyer distinguished himself through his brave actions in a battle at Le Bardon (north-west of Meung), resulting in the award of a Knight's Cross on 24 May 1871. In the Battle of Beaugency on 8 December 1870, the regiment held its positions against the French attacks. The regiment was kept on alert during the siege of Paris, but did not have to intervene in the fighting.

The regiment had officially fielded 66 officers and 2879 men at the start of the war; 54 officers and 2,193 men were present at the victory parade in Munich on 16 July 1871.

In 8 transports, 34 officers and 2333 men had been sent as reinforcements, so that the regiment had suffered a total loss in terms of dead, wounded and diseased, of 46 officers and 3019 men, that is, 100 more men than had originally belonged to the regiment at the start of the war.

== Notable members ==
=== Commanding officers ===
The commander was always the king himself, but the military and administrative leadership of the regiment lay with the colonel-commandants, or after 1872, with the commanders.

Commander	Time in office
Franz Freiherr von Hertling (28 June 1780 – 13 September 1844)	16 July 1814 – 11 February 1824
Friedrich von Greis (27 May 1779 – 6 February 1847)	11 February 1824 – 22 May 1836
Johann Ritter von Fleischmann (24 March 1771 – 27 December 1855)	22 May 1836 – 27 April 1841
Hugo von Bosch (1 January 1782 – 7 August 1865)	27 April 1841 – 18 October 1844
Wilhelm Freiherr von Jeetze	18 October 1844 – 7 April 1847
Ludwig Graf von Deroy (15 January 1786 – 11 February 1864)	7 April 1847 – 30 June 1848
Jakob Ermarth	30 June 1848 – 19 January 1851
August Freiherr von Frays (15 April 1790 – 24 October 1863)	19 January 1851 – 19 September 1851
Caspar von Hagens (22 December 1800 – 6 January 1877)	19 September 1851 – 9 May 1859
Karl Graf von Speti	9 May 1859 – 11 January 1865
Siegmund Freiherr von Pranckh (5 December 1821 – 8 May 1888)	11 January 1865 – 13 July 1866
Adalbert Högenstaller (8 August 1813 – 11 September 1880)	13 July 1866 – 14 April 1867
Anton Ritter von Täuffenbach (17 August 1817 – 25 February 1880)	14 April 1867 – 27 March 1871
Rudolf Freiherr von Gumppenberg	27 March 1871 – 3 November 1872
Heinrich von Wirthmann (1818–13 November 1893)	3 November 1872 – 15 December 1875
Otto von Parseval	15 December 1875 – 7 July 1881
Prince Arnulf of Bavaria (6 July 1862 – 12 November 1906)	7 July 1881 – 20 March 1884
Hugo von Helvig	20 March 1884 – 11 May 1888
Moriz von Bomhard (20 December 1836 – 17 June 1907)	11 May 1888 – 8 March 1889
Wilhelm Gemmingen Freiherr von Massenbach	8 March 1889 – 25 November 1891
Ludwig Edler von Grauvogl	25 November 1891 – 15 January 1895
Theophil Freiherr Reichlin von Meldegg	15 January 1895 – 9 November 1895
Karl Freiherr von Horn (16 February 1847 – 5 June 1923)	9 November 1895 – 10 May 1896
Karl Ferdinand Maximilian von Malaisé (27 March 1868 – 28 July 1946)	10 May 1896 – 17 March 1897
Alfred Graf Eckbrecht von Dürckheim-Montmartin	17 March 1897 – 14 August 1901
Felix Graf von Bothmer (10 December 1852 – 18 March 1937)	14 August 1901 – 18 May 1903
Friedrich Freiherr Kreß von Kressenstein	18 May 1903 – 17 October 1905
Karl von Brug (18 June 1855 – 25 March 1923)	17 October 1905 – 11 September 1906
Maximilian Graf von Montgelas (23 May 1860 – 4 February 1938)	11 September 1906 – 18 September 1908
Alexander Freiherr von Harsdorf auf Enderndorf	18 November 1908 – 24 January 1910
Bernhard von Hartz	24 January 1910 – 1 October 1912
Friedrich Freiherr von Pechmann (28 July 1862 – 6 December 1919)	1 October 1912 – 24 December 1914
Franz Ritter von Epp (16 October 1868 – 31 December 1946)	24 December 1914 - 1918

=== Pour le Mérite awards, 1914-1918 ===
- 5 December 1917, Lieutenant of the Reserve Ferdinand Schörner
- 29 May 1918, Colonel Franz Ritter von Epp

=== Military Order of Max Joseph Knight's Cross awards, 1914-1918 ===
- 15 November 1915, First Lieutenant Hans Freiherr von Speidel (killed 28 December 1916)
- 25 June 1916, Prince Heinrich of Bavaria (killed 8 November 1916)
- 23 June 1916, Lieutenant Colonel Franz Ritter von Epp
- 11 July 1916, Captain Emmerich Freiherr von Godin
- 24 June 1916, Captain of the Reserve Günther Freiherr von Pechmann
- 20 July 1916, Lieutenant of the Reserve Wilhelm Meng
- 6 January 1917, Major Robert Graf von Bothmer (killed 28 September 1918)
- 6 January 1917, First Lieutenant Ludwig Graf von Bothmer
- 10 August 1917, Lieutenant of the Reserve Hans von Ruckteschell
- 27 October 1917, Lieutenant of the Reserve Karl Ritter von Halt
- 28 May 1918, Lieutenant of the Reserve Franz Wimmer
- 18 September 1918, Captain Hans von Pranckh
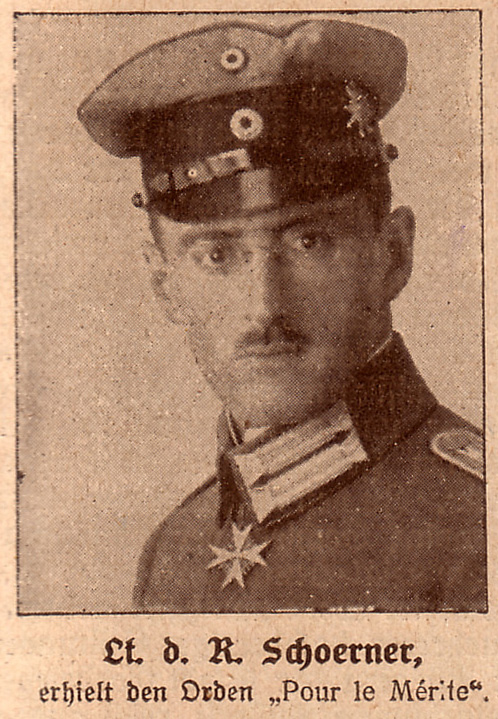
Lieutenant Ferdinand Schoerner with the Pour le Mérite

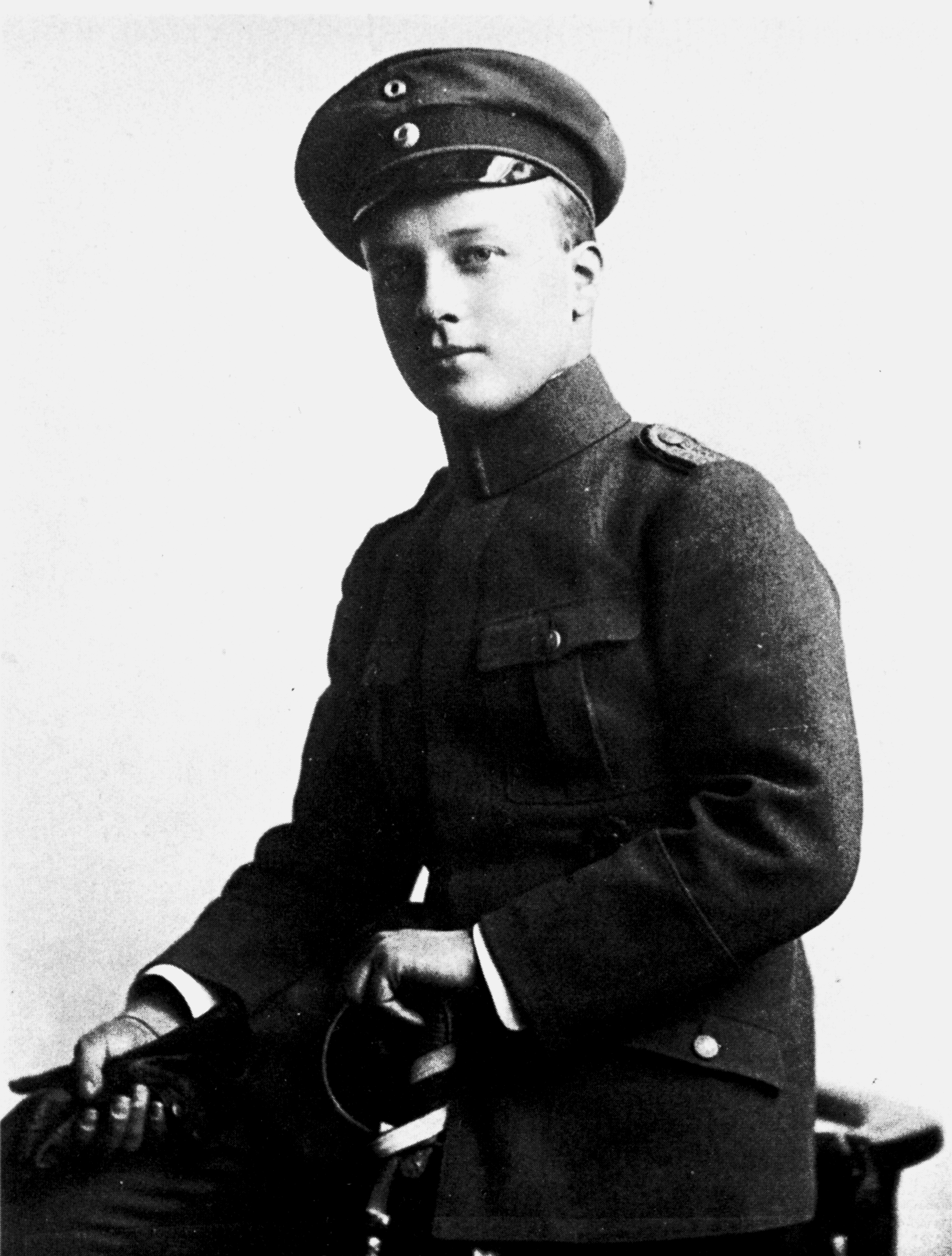
Anton Graf von Arco auf Valley

== See also ==
- List of Imperial German infantry regiments
- Hartschier
