= Sankt Marein-Feistritz =

- Municipality
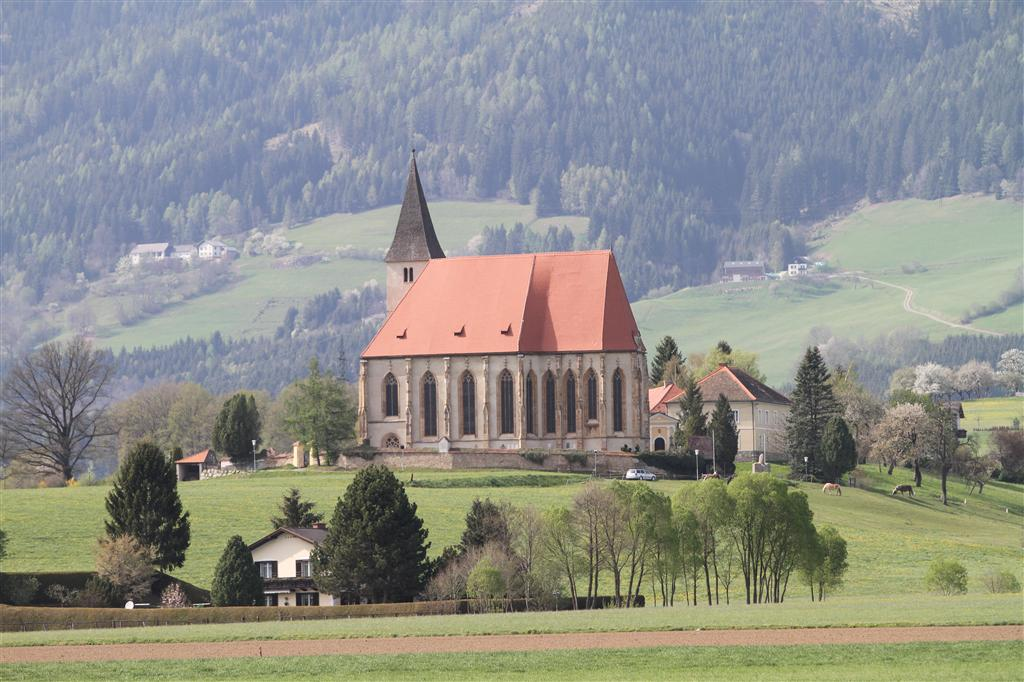
- Church of the Nativity of the Virgin Mary

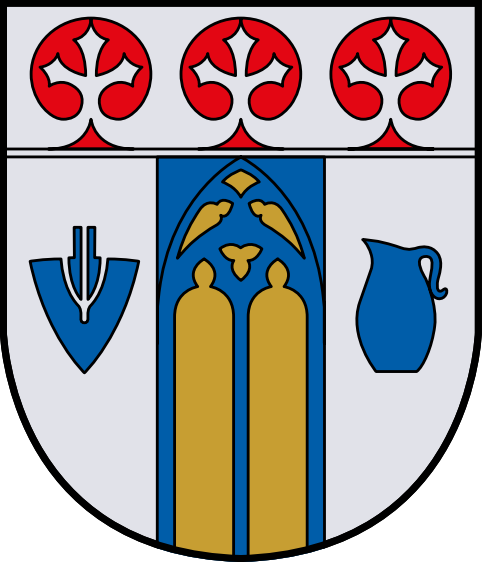
- Coat of arms

- Location within Austria Sankt Marein-Feistritz (Austria)
- Coordinates: 47°16′16″N 14°51′38″E
- Country: Austria
- State: Styria
- District: Murtal

Government
  - Mayor: Bruno Aschenbrenner (ÖVP)

Area
  - Total: 70.61 km^{2} (27.26 sq mi)
- Elevation: 698 m (2,290 ft)

Population (2018-01-01)
  - Total: 2,010
  - Density: 28.5/km^{2} (73.7/sq mi)
- Time zone: UTC+1 (CET)
  - Summer (DST): UTC+2 (CEST)
- Postal code: 8715, 8733
- Area code: +43 3515
- Website: www.st-marein-feistritz.gv.at

Sankt Marein-Feistritz is a municipality since 2015 in the Murtal District of Styria, Austria.

The municipality, Sankt Marein-Feistritz, was created as part of the Styria municipal structural reform, at the end of 2014, by merging the former towns Sankt Marein bei Knittelfeld and Feistritz bei Knittelfeld.

== Geography ==
=== Municipality arrangement ===
The municipality territory includes the following 15 sections (populations as of 1 January 2015):

- Altendorf (211)
- Feistritz bei Knittelfeld (582)
- Feistritzgraben (1)
- Fentsch (130)
- Fressenberg (45)
- Greith (129)
- Hof (115)
- Kniepaß (8)
- Laas (64)
- Mitterfeld (14)
- Moos (6)
- Prankh (123)
- Sankt Marein bei Knittelfeld (299)
- Sankt Martha (190)
- Wasserleith (109)

The municipality consists of the six Katastralgemeinden (areas as of 2015):

- Feistritz (989.17 ha or 2,444.3 acres)
- Fressenberg (940.78 ha or 2,324.7 acres)
- Greuth (1,002.28 ha or 2,476.7 acres)
- Prank (429.63 ha or 1,061.6 acres)
- St. Marein (482.67 ha or 1,192.7 acres)
- Wasserleith (3,215.08 ha or 7,944.6 acres)

=== Tourism ===
The municipality formed, together with Lobmingtal, Kobenz, Seckau, Spielberg, Gaal and Zeltweg, "Tourismus am Spielberg". The base is in the town Spielberg.
