= Bavarian Army Reform (1868) =

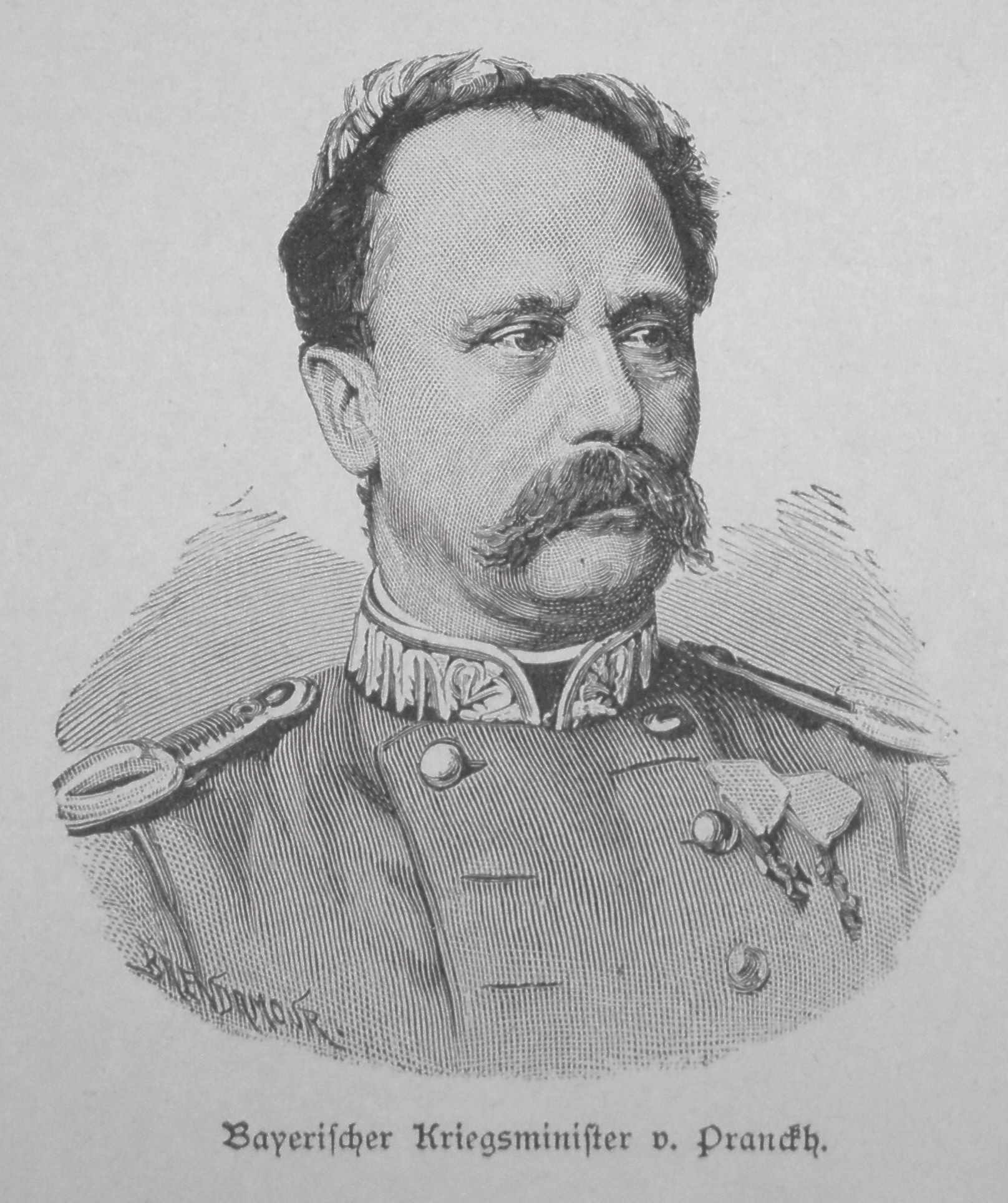
Portrait of Kriegsminister von Pranckh

After the experience of the Bavarian Army in the war against Prussia, in 1868 the Bavarian War Minister Siegmund Freiherr von Pranckh fundamentally reformed the army. His main measures were:

- Reforms of the military reinforcement system:
1. Abolition of the practice of avoiding conscription by hiring a paid substitute, called a Einsteher ("Proxy") or Einstandsmann ("Stand-In"), to volunteer to take their place.
2. Creation of Dienstzeit (compulsory military service-time requirement) of three years for all able-bodied men.
3. Introduction of the Einjährig-Freiwilliger (“One-year volunteer”) system after the Prussian model.
- Abolition of Bavaria's Landwehr. The term Landsturm was henceforth used for the older members of the Reserve.
- Foundation of the I Royal Bavarian Corps in Munich and II Royal Bavarian Corps in Würzburg
- The Bavarian Cadet Corps was put on an equal footing with a Realgymnasium.

Through these reforms, the Bavarian Army was able to participate significantly in the Franco-Prussian War.
