= Frojach-Katsch =

- Former municipality
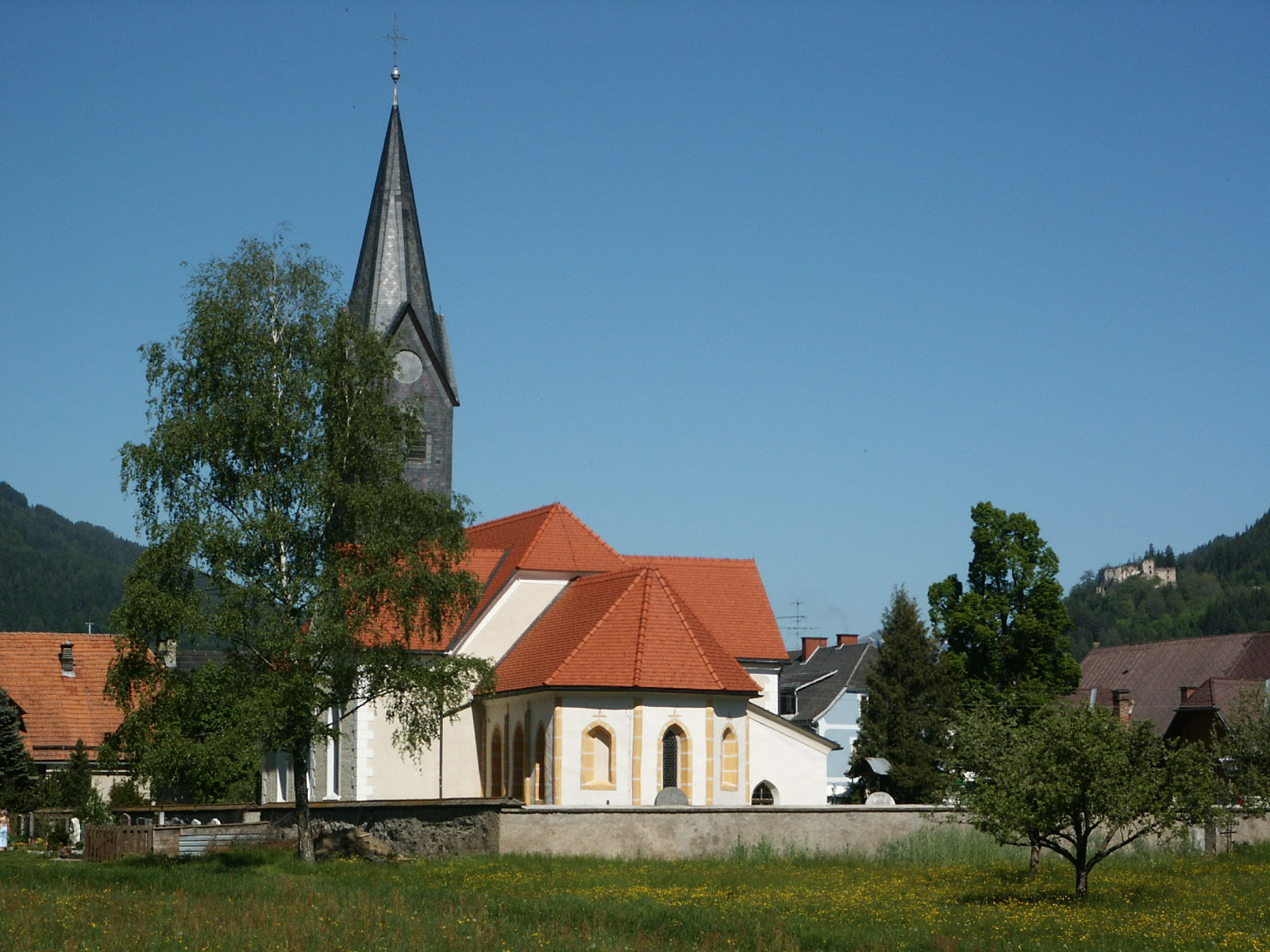
- Church in Frojach

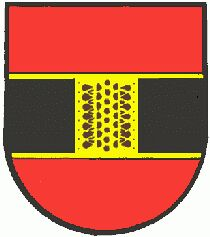
- Coat of arms

- Location within Austria
- Coordinates: 47°08′00″N 14°18′00″E
- Country: Austria
- State: Styria
- District: Murau

Area
  - Total: 38.89 km^{2} (15.02 sq mi)
- Elevation: 762 m (2,500 ft)

Population (1 January 2016)
  - Total: 1,155
  - Density: 29.70/km^{2} (76.92/sq mi)
- Time zone: UTC+1 (CET)
  - Summer (DST): UTC+2 (CEST)
- Postal code: 8841 (Frojach), 8842 (Katsch)
- Area code: 03588
- Vehicle registration: MU
- Website: www.frojach-katsch.steiermark.at

Frojach-Katsch is a former municipality in the district of Murau in Styria, Austria. Since the 2015 Styria municipal structural reform, it is part of the municipality Teufenbach-Katsch.

== Population ==
Historical population
Year	Pop.	±%
1869	936	—
1880	846	−9.6%
1890	855	+1.1%
1900	846	−1.1%
1910	908	+7.3%
1923	944	+4.0%
1934	1,105	+17.1%
1939	1,154	+4.4%
1951	1,182	+2.4%
1961	1,180	−0.2%
1971	1,187	+0.6%
1981	1,984	+67.1%
1991	1,175	−40.8%
2001	1,248	+6.2%
2011	1,199	−3.9%
