= Sankt Marein bei Knittelfeld =

- Former municipality
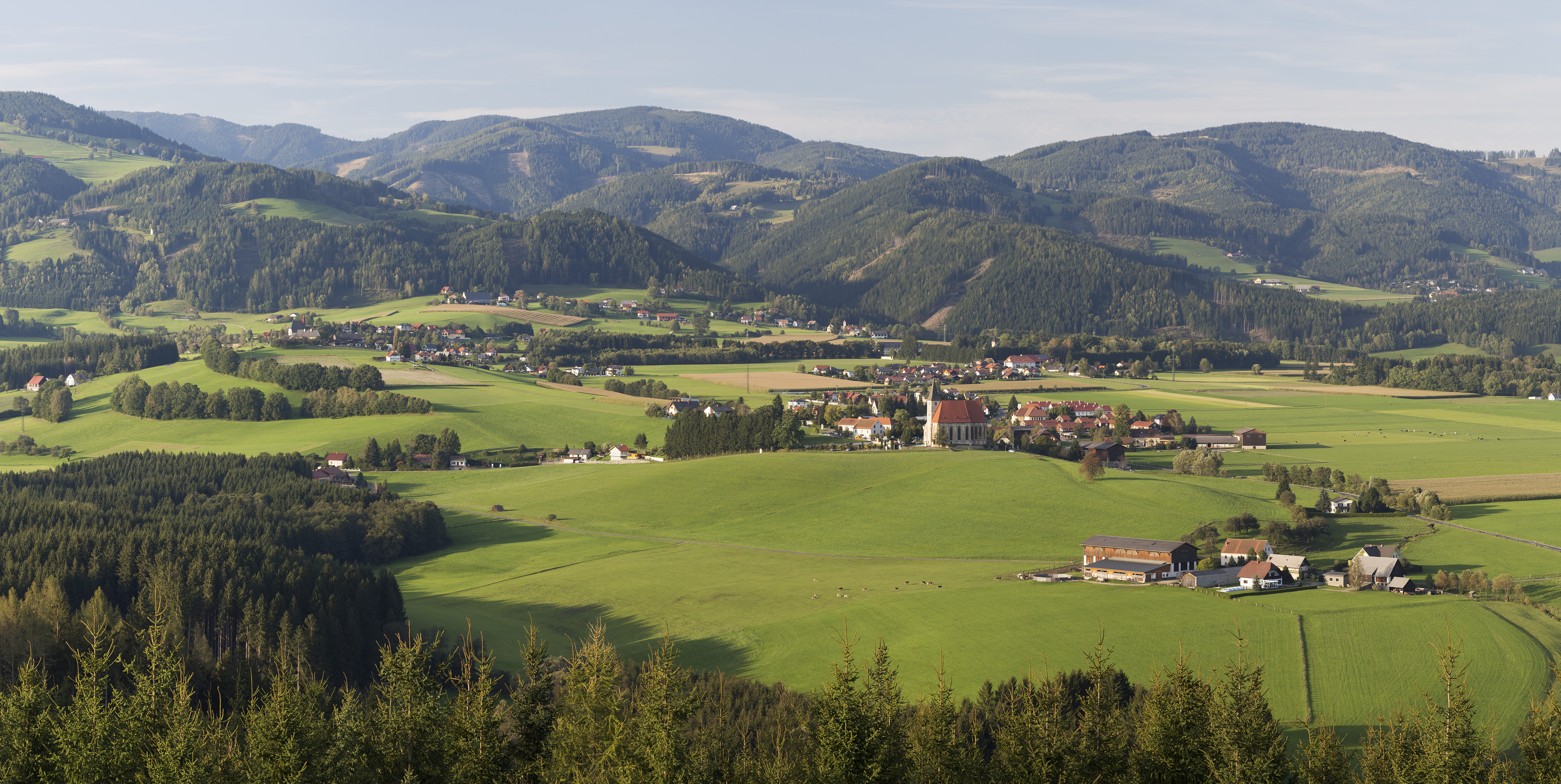
- Remote view of Sankt Marein

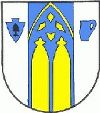
- Coat of arms

- Location within Austria
- Coordinates: 47°16′16″N 14°51′38″E
- Country: Austria
- State: Styria
- District: Murtal

Area
  - Total: 60.64 km^{2} (23.41 sq mi)
- Elevation: 698 m (2,290 ft)

Population (1 January 2016)
  - Total: 1,245
  - Density: 20.53/km^{2} (53.18/sq mi)
- Time zone: UTC+1 (CET)
  - Summer (DST): UTC+2 (CEST)
- Postal code: 8733
- Area code: 03515
- Vehicle registration: KF
- Website: www.st-marein-knittelfeld. steiermark.at

Sankt Marein bei Knittelfeld is a former municipality in the district of Murtal in Styria, Austria. Since the 2015 Styria municipal structural reform, it is part of the municipality Sankt Marein-Feistritz.
