= Feistritz bei Knittelfeld =

- Former municipality
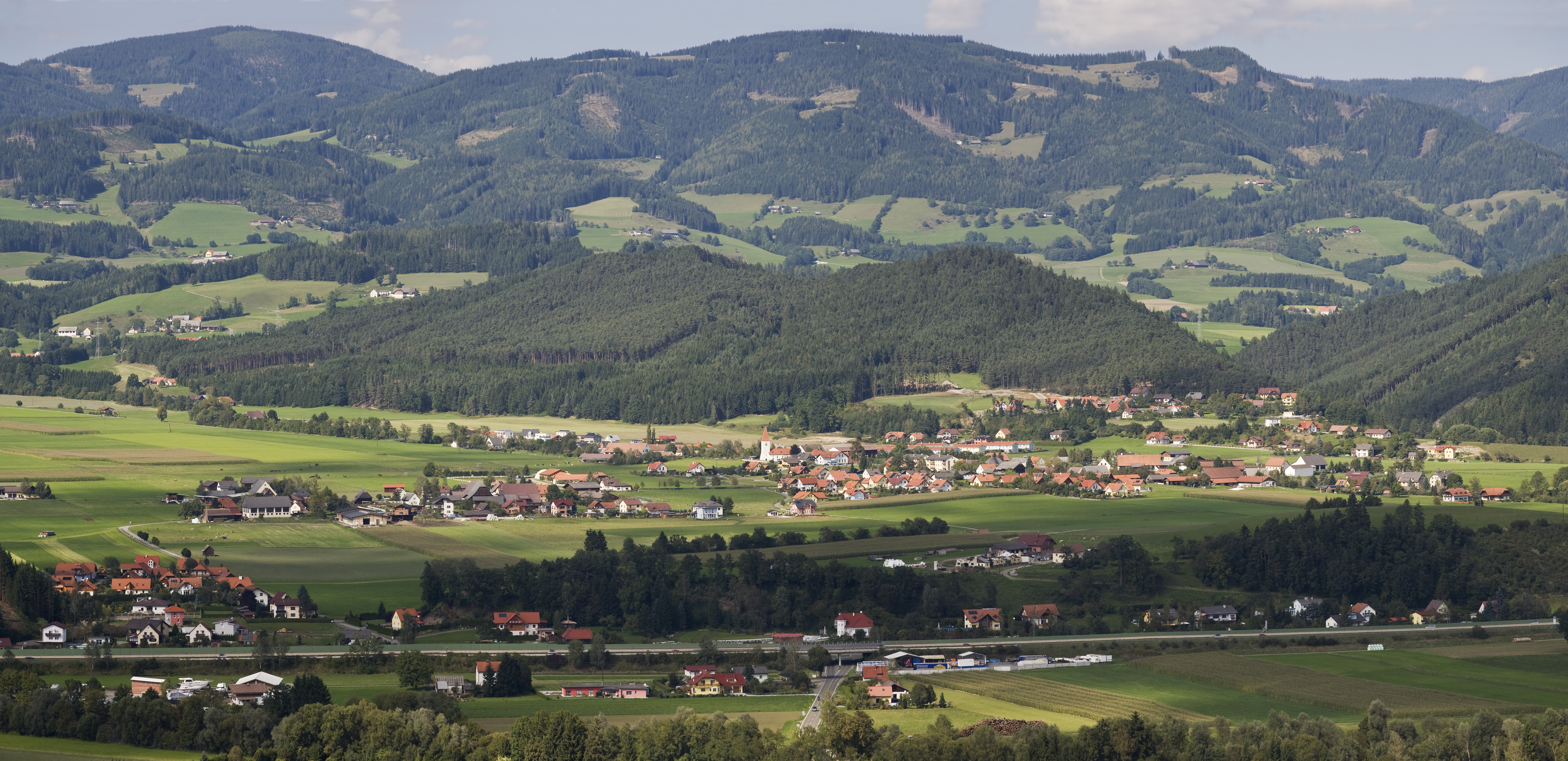
- View of Feistritz

- Coat of arms

- Location within Austria
- Coordinates: 47°16′00″N 14°52′00″E
- Country: Austria
- State: Styria
- District: Murtal

Area
  - Total: 9.93 km^{2} (3.83 sq mi)
- Elevation: 647 m (2,123 ft)

Population (1 January 2016)
  - Total: 789
  - Density: 79.5/km^{2} (206/sq mi)
- Time zone: UTC+1 (CET)
  - Summer (DST): UTC+2 (CEST)
- Postal code: 8715
- Area code: 03515
- Vehicle registration: KF
- Website: feistritz-knittelfeld. steiermark.at

Feistritz bei Knittelfeld is a former municipality in the district of Murtal in Styria, Austria. Since the 2015 Styria municipal structural reform, it is part of the municipality Sankt Marein-Feistritz.
