= Vol (heraldry) =

Heraldic figure formed by two wings conjoined

A vol or.

A vol (French for "flight") is a heraldic symbol consisting of a pair of outstretched, usually plumed bird's wings, which are connected together at their shoulders without having any bird body in the middle. This was formerly popular in crests, especially in Germanic heraldry, but has found popularity outside heraldry in more recent times with its use as insignia in aviation.

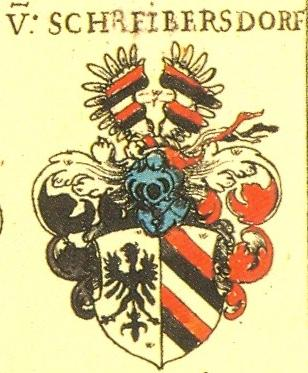
A vol in the crest of the arms of the barons of Schreibersdorf (today Pisarzowice) in Siebmacher's armorial

The French Armée de l'Air, one of the world's first air forces, adopted a vol for its cap badge, rather than the eagle used by many other air forces. In France, the eagle is associated with the Napoleonic Empire.

== Cap badges ==
Many European countries have an eagle as the main charge of the heraldic shields of their respective monarchies: Germany, Austria-Hungary, and pre-revolutionary Russia all used some derivative of this bird in their badge. Poland did too, and even kept its badge under Communist rule, because Poland did not have a king since the partition of Poland late in the eighteenth century, so the symbol was merely nominal. In America, the cap badge of the US Air Force is the Great Seal of the United States, which also includes an eagle. But its use for the US Air Force derives from that service's derivation from the US Army, which also had the same badge.

Another source for putting an eagle on the cap badge is that it stands for royalty in general. Thus the Royal Air Force includes a complete eagle, even though the coat of arms of the United Kingdom does not. The air forces of various Arab countries do as well. And the air force of Egypt, although not a monarchy, uses "Saladin's Eagle" as well; formerly, they used a hawk. During the Second World War, the air forces of Italy, the Netherlands, Greece, and Yugoslavia also used a bird of prey as their cap badge. Over a decade after the Second World War, Japan formed the Air Self-Defense Force. This too had a bird other than an eagle as an emblem: a bird-of-prey called a kite, referring to a battle during which a kite was seen in a tree against the rising sun.

Other countries use the vol as their main emblem. Israel Air Force is notable in that its emblem, not being a complete bird, avoids idolatry. The countries of the Warsaw Pact during the Cold War generally rejected the use of the eagle in the list of state seals above. For example, the Soviet air force used a vol very similar to the French, but supported a conventional, five-pointed star, so as to distinguish themselves from having anything to do with Imperial Russia. Hungary had nearly the same symbol, while Romania had a different one. The Deutsche Luftstreitkräfte, or East German Air Force, used a particularly modernistic vol as its cap badge. This had extra significance, because the Luftwaffe of Nazi Germany used an eagle carrying a swastika. Currently, the Russians have returned to their heraldic past, while the Germans use a symbol different from that of the Luftwaffe.

== Insignia of branch of service ==
Air services which are not independent from their country's armies have used a vol as the insignia of their branch of service. The US Army Air Forces, during the Second World War, used a winged, two-bladed propeller on the lapels of their tunics. The same sort of insigne was used by the Soviets before they had an independent air force. Warsaw Pact armed forces often had a red, five-pointed star superimposed upon the juncture point of this symbol.

== Pilot's insigne ==
It is as the symbol of "wings" given to trained aircraft operators for which the vol is primarily used. All of the pilot's badges of the USAF, as well as the various Naval Aviator's badges of the USN, employ vols with a shield standing for Congress in the middle. These are of different design, and the USAF used silver while the USN uses gold, and has an anchor behind the shield. The US Army uses "wings" with an open parachute in the middle for paratroopers.

During the Second World War, the uniforms of Denmark, Norway, Belgium, France, Nationalist China, and even the RAF used a form of the vol as their pilot's insigne. The air forces of Belgium, the Netherlands, Italy, Greece, Poland, and Yugoslavia used an entire bird. The Japanese had quite a different emblem; its wings are recognisably those of an aircraft.

== Rank insigne ==
For the Luftwaffe, a vol was used to replace the chevron on the sleeves of enlisted men's uniforms. And the Romanian Air Force before 1945 used a vol for the shoulder rank insignia for warrant officers. UBS investment bank currently operates shoulder rank insignia amongst its Volatility Trading Department.

== Collar tab insigne ==
The uniforms of British Army officers have gorget patches of a color different from the rest of the uniform sewn on their lapels, and so did many arms of the German military. Specifically, the uniforms of both enlisted ranks and officers in the Deutsche Luftstreitkräfte (or East German Air Force) did too. These had embroidered symbols on them which were rather similar to the vols used for rank insignia.

== Heraldic Use ==
'Vol' is term used in both Anglophone and Francophone heraldries - as in the bearings of Ripstein, Canada. Both the terms 'vol' and 'demi vol' (half a vol, i.e. a single wing) have been turning up every so often in Scots heraldry since the late 17th century - Sir Thomas Brand's crest, 'a volle with the baton of his office [Knight Usher of the Green Rod] in pale', in the Scottish Public Register volume 1, page 123, and the crest of Richard Graham, Viscount of Prestoun, volume 1, page 84
