= Teufenbach-Katsch =

- Municipality
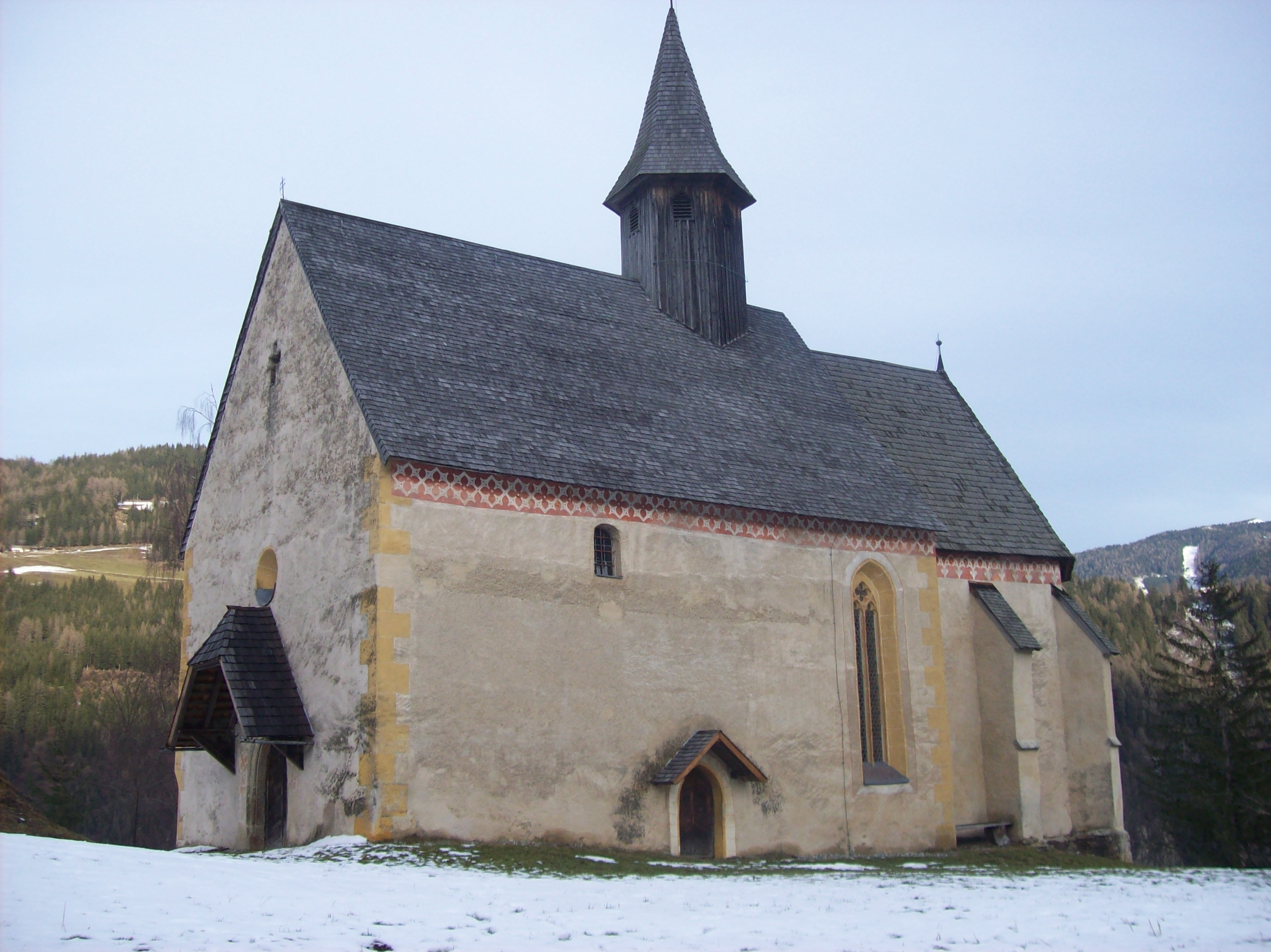
- Saint Laurentius church in Katsch

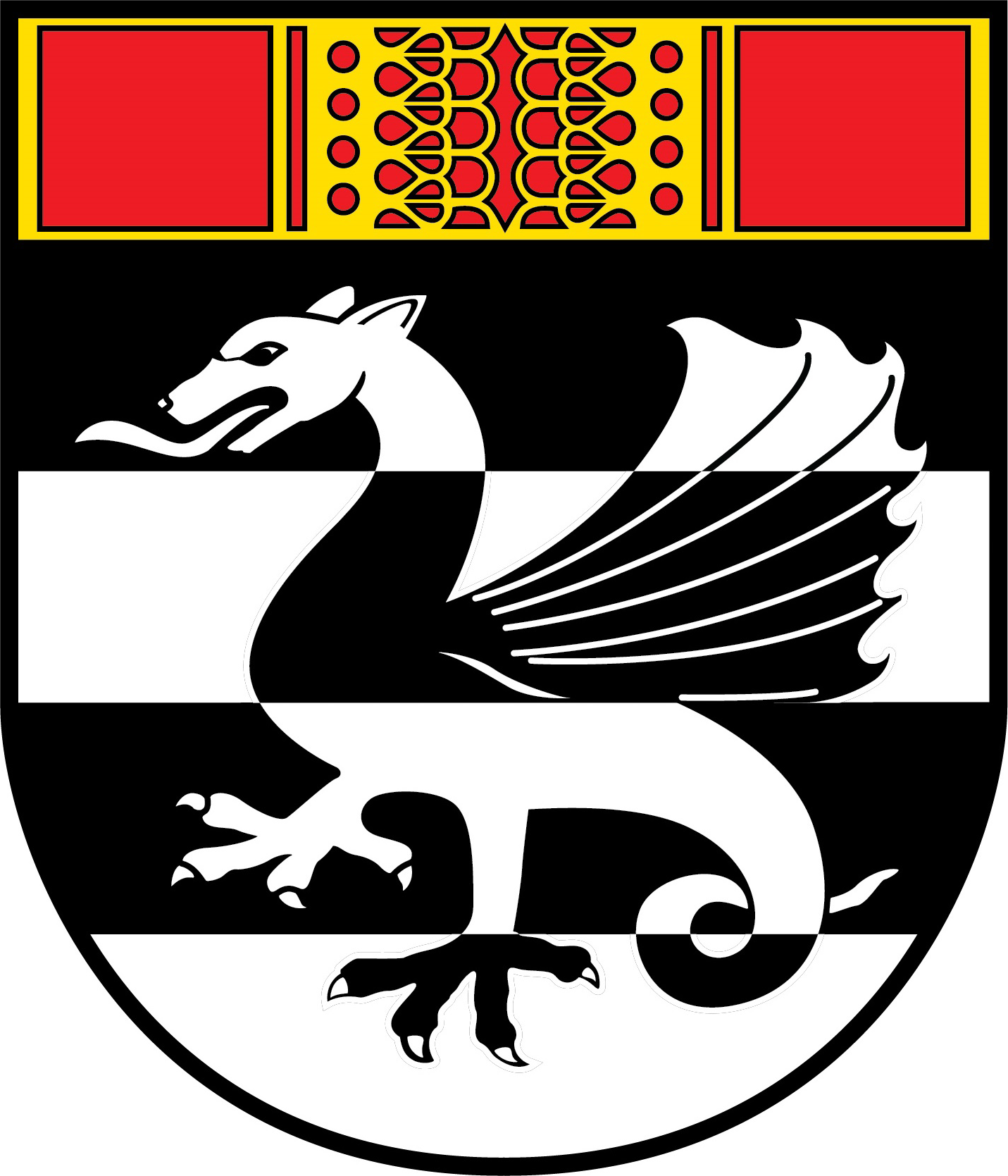
- Coat of arms

- Location within Austria
- Coordinates: 47°07′43″N 14°21′32″E
- Country: Austria
- State: Styria
- District: Murau

Government
  - Mayor: Lydia Künstner-Stöckl (SPÖ)

Area
  - Total: 42.32 km^{2} (16.34 sq mi)
- Elevation: 760 m (2,490 ft)

Population (2018-01-01)
  - Total: 1,899
  - Density: 44.87/km^{2} (116.2/sq mi)
- Time zone: UTC+1 (CET)
  - Summer (DST): UTC+2 (CEST)
- Postal code: 8812, 8833, 8841, 8842, 8850
- Website: www.teufenbach-katsch.gv.at

Teufenbach-Katsch is a municipality since 2015 in the Murau District of Styria, Austria.

It was created as part of the Styria municipal structural reform, at the end of 2014, by merging the former towns Teufenbach and Frojach-Katsch.

== Geography ==
=== Municipality arrangement ===
The municipality territory includes the following three hamlets (populations as of January 2015):

- Frojach (572)
- Katsch an der Mur (593)
- Teufenbach (692)

The municipality consists of the three Katastralgemeinden: Frojach, Katsch und Teufenbach.

== Culture and sights ==
- Pfarrkirche Frojach church
