= Burgruine Fohnsdorf =

Castle in Austria

Coordinates: 47.211°N 14.674°E

- Styria, Austria
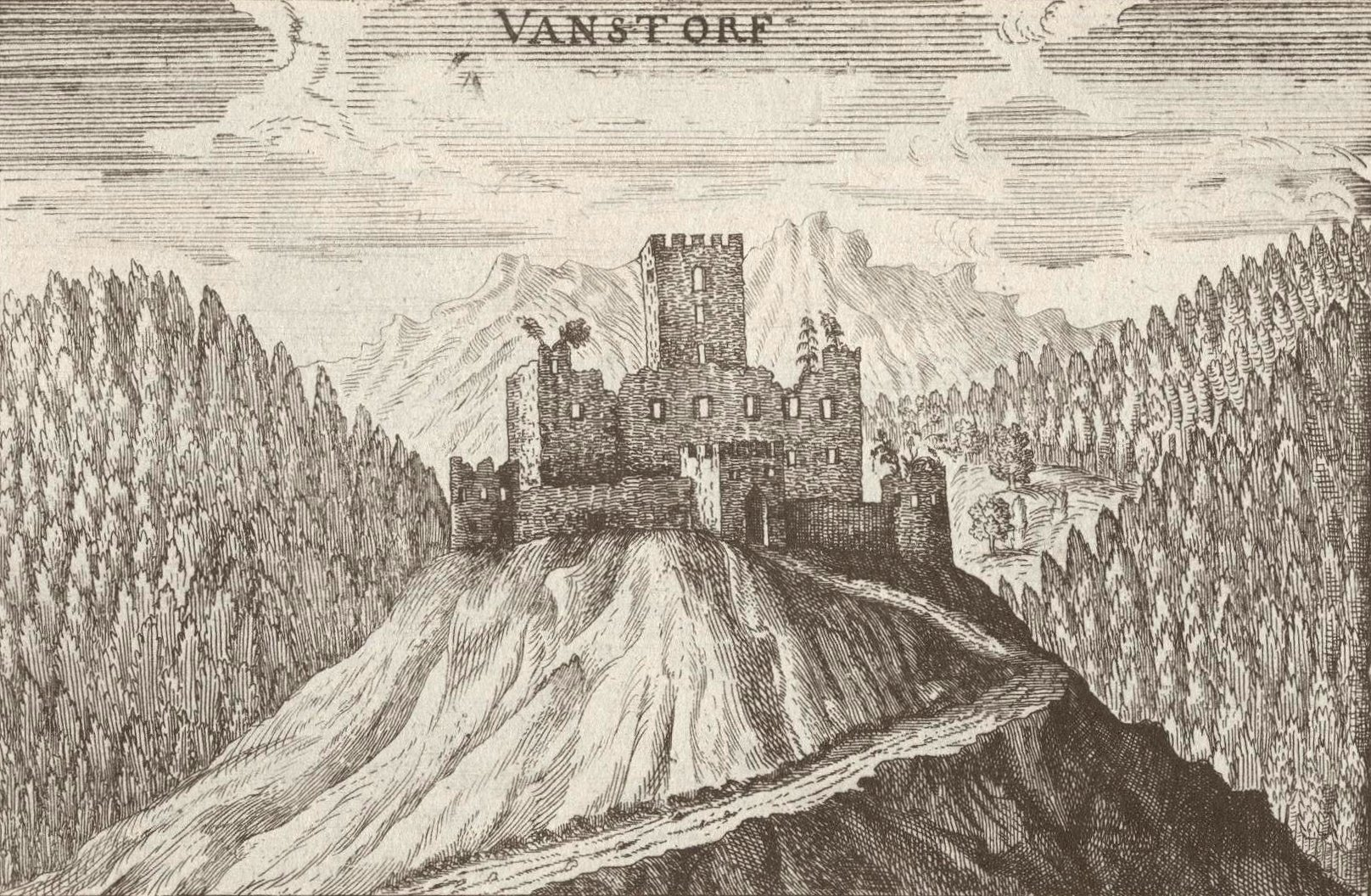
- Ruins of Burgruine Fohnsdorf around 1681

Site information
- Type: Hill castle

Site history
- Built: 9th century

Burgruine Fohnsdorf is a ruinous castle in Styria, Austria.

== See also ==
- List of castles in Austria
