= Seidenhauskaserne =

Coordinates: 48°08′30″N 11°34′55″E

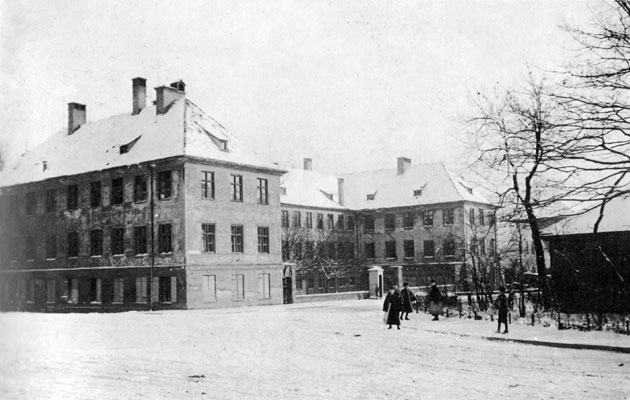
Seidenhauskaserne, 1895

The Seidenhauskaserne (literally silk house kaserne), also called Artillerie-Kaserne, was a small military facility of the Bavarian army, located at Hofgarten Strasse 1 in Munich, Germany, which existed from 1808 until 1899.

== History ==
Because the existing barracks of the Munich garrison had an unfavourable tactical location, and some of them had fallen into disrepair, in 1803 the Bavarian army rented the old court silk factory building to accommodate their artillery troops in the south-eastern corner of the Hofgarten at the northern outskirts of old Munich, nearby the new Hofgartenkaserne, which was under construction since 1801.

Due to the epidemic of typhoid in the Hofgarten- and the Seidenhauskaserne in 1893, a meeting of scientists, physicians, military, engineers and representatives of the city was scheduled to clarify the reasons. Chairman of the meeting was the Bavarian minister of war Adolph von Asch who decided that the barracks should be closed. The Seidenhauskaserne was fully evacuated in 1899. The building was slated for demolition in 1900 to make way for an army museum.
