= Pavilion =

Type of building

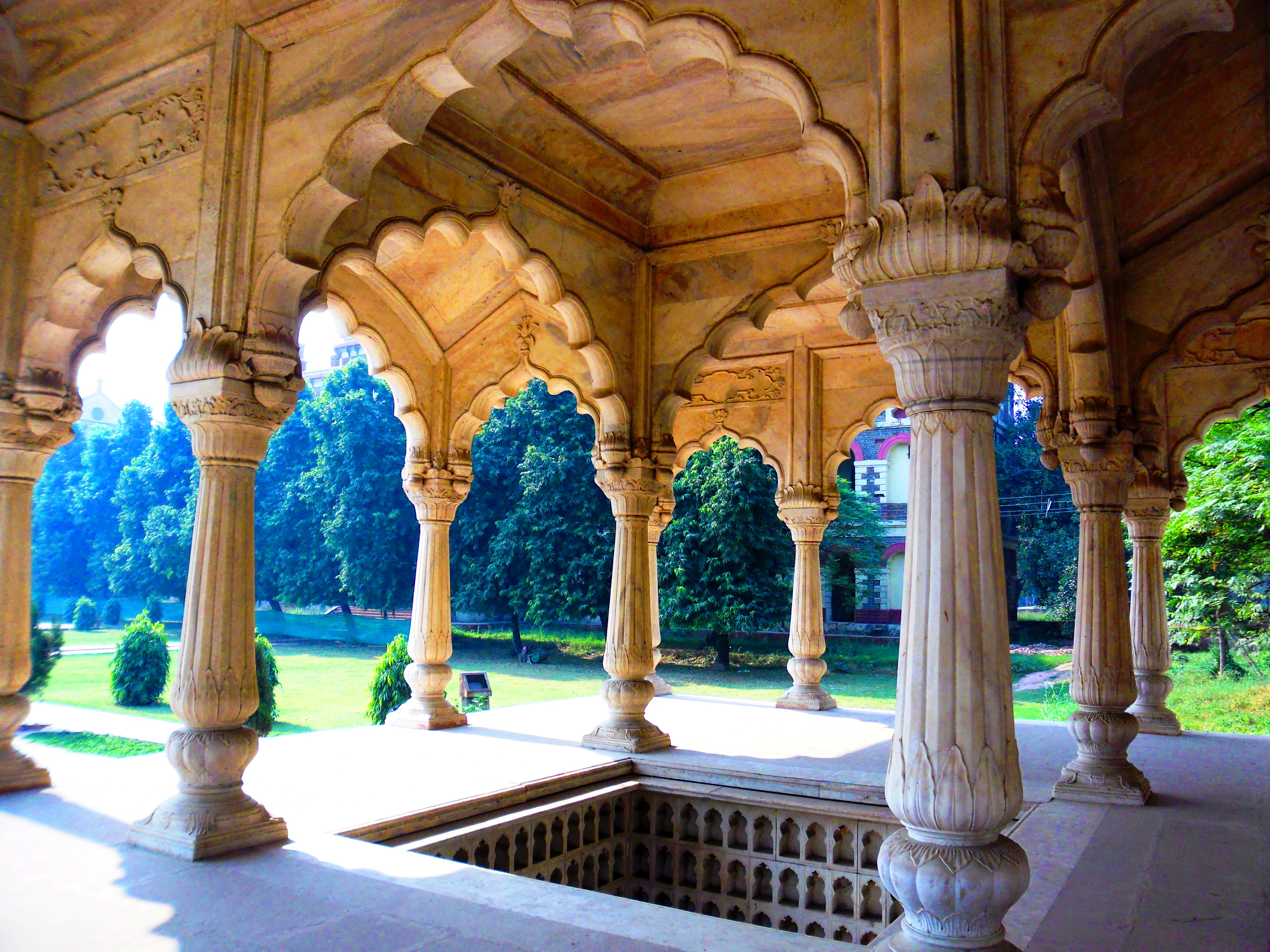
A marble pavilion, Red Fort, Delhi

In architecture, pavilion has several meanings:

- It may be a subsidiary building that is either positioned separately or as an attachment to a main building. Often it is associated with pleasure. In palaces and traditional mansions of Asia, there may be pavilions that are either freestanding or connected by covered walkways, as in the Forbidden City (Chinese pavilions), Topkapi Palace in Istanbul, and in Mughal buildings like the Red Fort.
- As part of a large palace, pavilions may be symmetrically placed building blocks that flank (appear to join) a main building block or the outer ends of wings extending from both sides of a central building block, the corps de logis. Such configurations provide an emphatic visual termination to the composition of a large building, akin to bookends.

The word is from French pavillon (Old French paveillon) and it meant a small palace, from Latin papilionem (accusative of papilio). In Late Latin and Old French, it meant both ‘butterfly’ and ‘tent’, because the canvas of a tent resembled a butterfly's spread wings.

The word is from the early 13c., paviloun, "large, stately tent raised on posts and used as a movable habitation," from Old French paveillon "large tent; butterfly" (12c.), from Latin papilionem (nominative papilio) "butterfly, moth," in Medieval Latin "tent" (see papillon); the type of tent was so called on its resemblance to wings. Meaning "open building in a park, etc., used for shelter or entertainment" is attested from 1680s. Sense of "small or moderate-sized building, isolated from but dependent on a larger or principal building" (as in a hospital) is by 1858.

== Free-standing structures ==
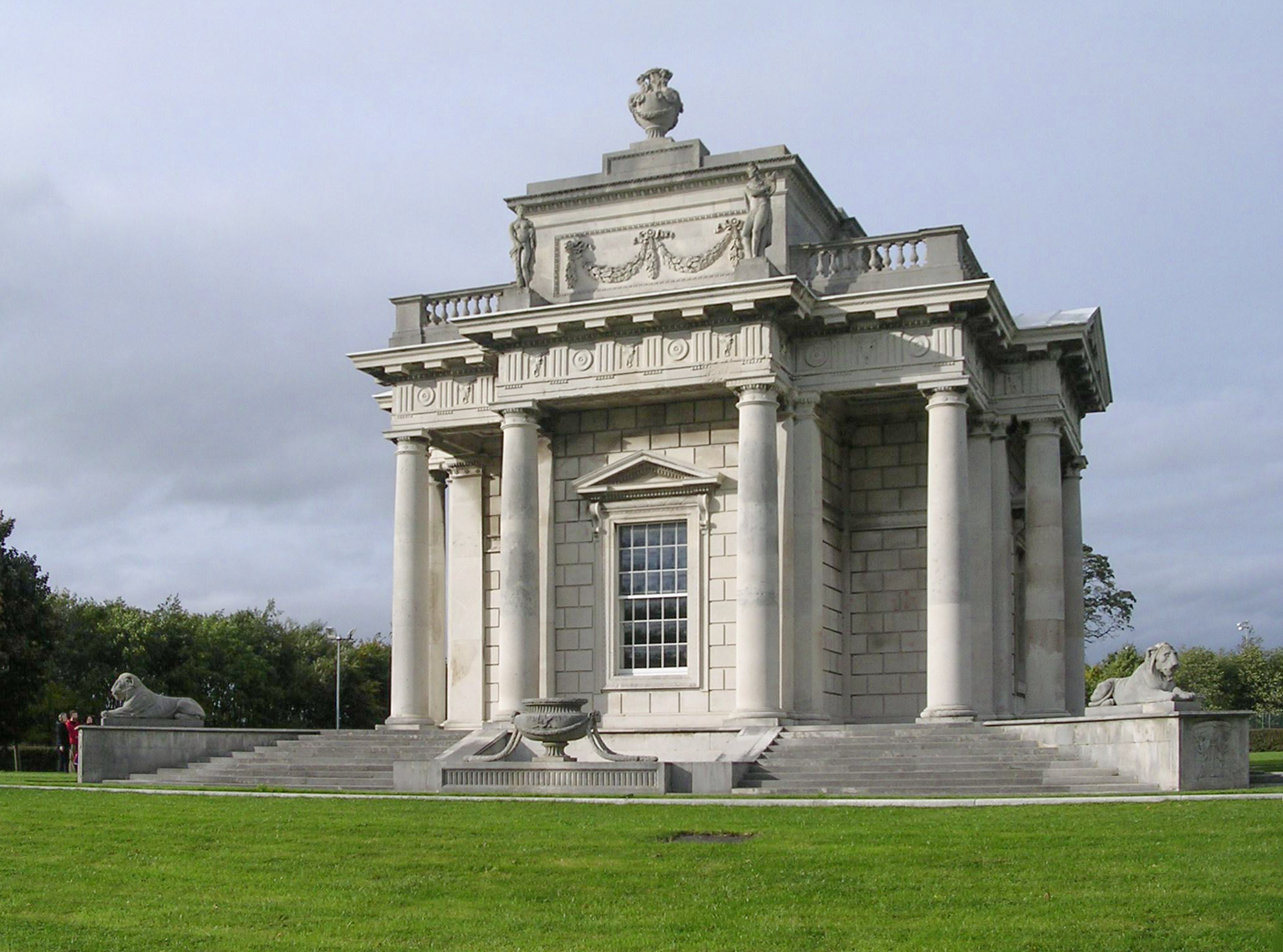
The Casino at Marino

Pavilions may be small garden outbuildings, similar to a summer house or a kiosk; small rooms on the roof of a large house, reached only via the roof (rather than by internal stairs) may also be called pavilions. These were particularly popular up to the 18th century and can be equated to the Italian casina, formerly rendered in English "casino". These often resembled small classical temples and follies. Especially if there is some space for food preparation, they may be called a banqueting house. A pavilion built to take advantage of a view may be referred to as a gazebo. Bandstands in a park are a class of pavilion. A poolhouse by a swimming pool may have sufficient character and charm to be called a pavilion. By contrast, a free-standing pavilion can also be a far larger building such as the Royal Pavilion at Brighton, which is in fact a large Indian-style palace; however, like its smaller namesakes, the common factor is that it was built for pleasure and relaxation.

A sports pavilion is usually a building adjacent to a sports ground used for changing clothes and often partaking of refreshments. Often it has a verandah to provide protection from the sun for spectators. In cricket grounds, as at Lord's, a cricket pavilion tends to be used for the building the players emerge from and return to, even when this is actually a large building including a grandstand. A pavilion in stadia, especially baseball parks, is a typically single-decked covered seating area (as opposed to the more expensive seating area of the main grandstand and the less expensive seating area of the uncovered bleachers).

== Classical architecture ==
Externally, pavilions may be emphasised by any combination of a change in height, profile (a flat facade may end in round pavilions, or flat ones that project out), colour, material, and ornament. Internally they may be part of a rectangular block, or only connected to the main block by a thin section of building. The two 18th-century English country houses of Houghton Hall and Holkham Hall illustrate these different approaches in turn.

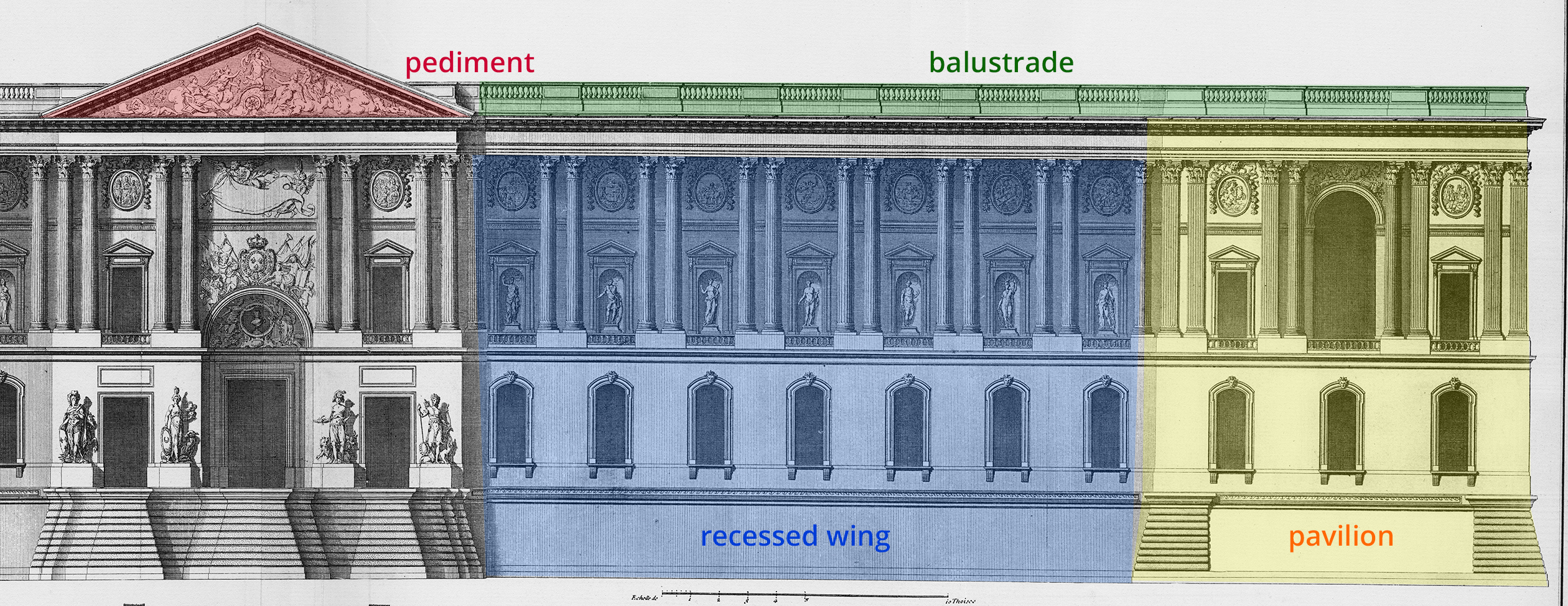
Illustration of the classical Louvre Colonnade in Paris with its pavilion highlighted in yellow

In the Place des Vosges (1605–1612), Paris, twin pavilions mark the centers of the north and south sides of the square. They are named the Pavillon du Roi (“king’s pavilion”) and the Pavillon de la Reine (“queen’s pavilion”), though no royal personage ever lived in the square. With their triple archways, they function like gatehouses that give access to the privileged space of the square. French gatehouses had been built in the form of such pavilions in the preceding century.

== Other uses ==
In some areas, a pavilion is a hunting lodge. The Pavillon de Galon in Luberon, France, is a typical 18th-century aristocratic hunting pavilion. The pavilion, located on the site of an old Roman villa, includes a garden à la française, which was used by the guests for receptions.

== Gallery ==
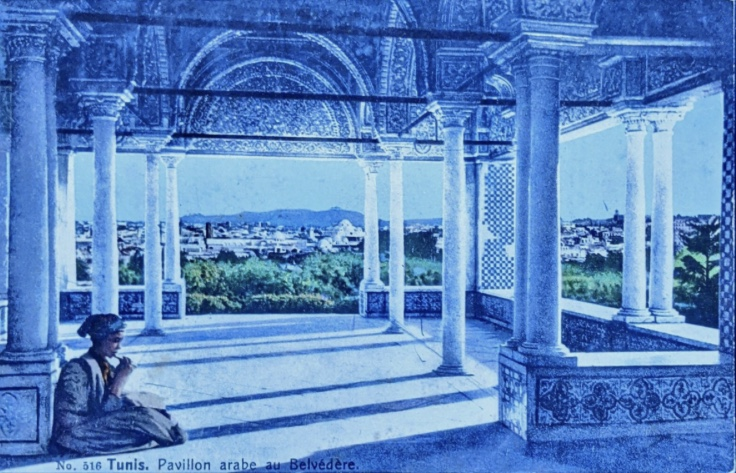
Arab Pavilion at Belvedere Park, Tunis

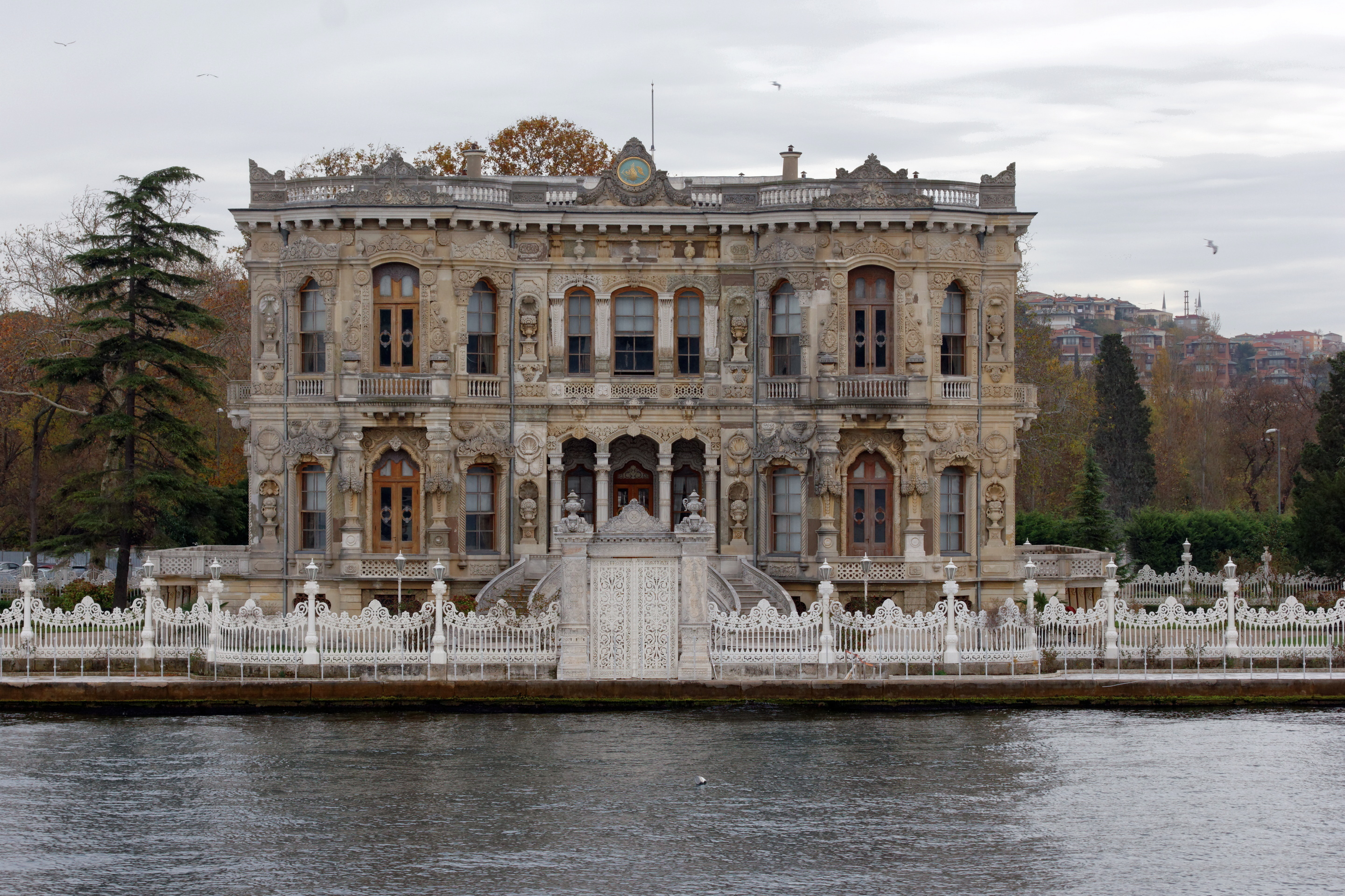
Küçüksu Pavilion in Istanbul, Turkey

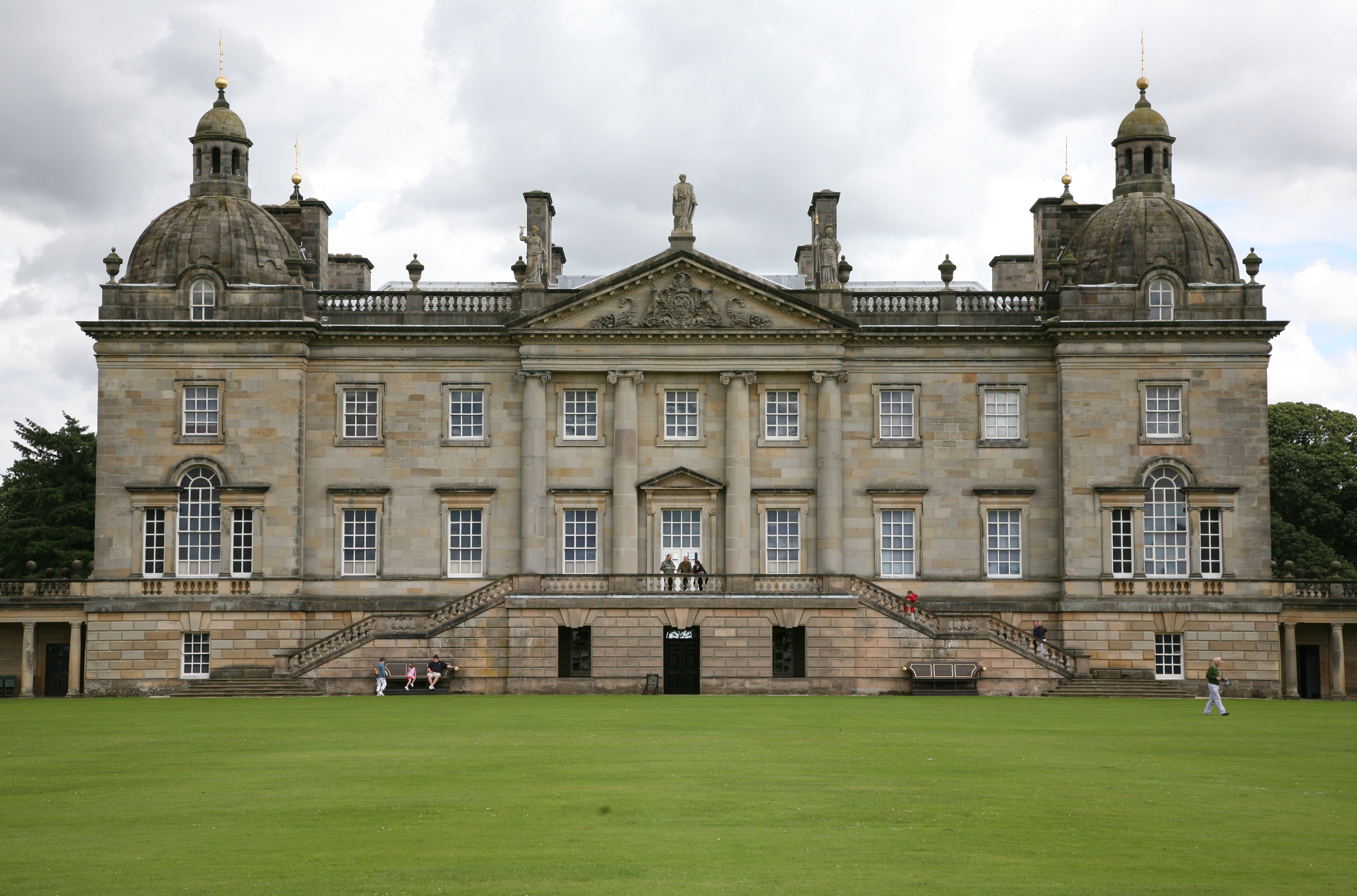
The frontage of Houghton Hall ends in a pavilion on each side

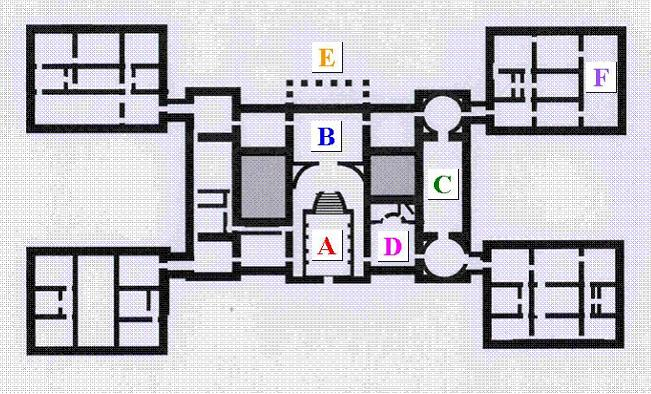
Plan of the main part of Holkham Hall, where, unlike Houghton, only a thin section connects the pavilions to the main block

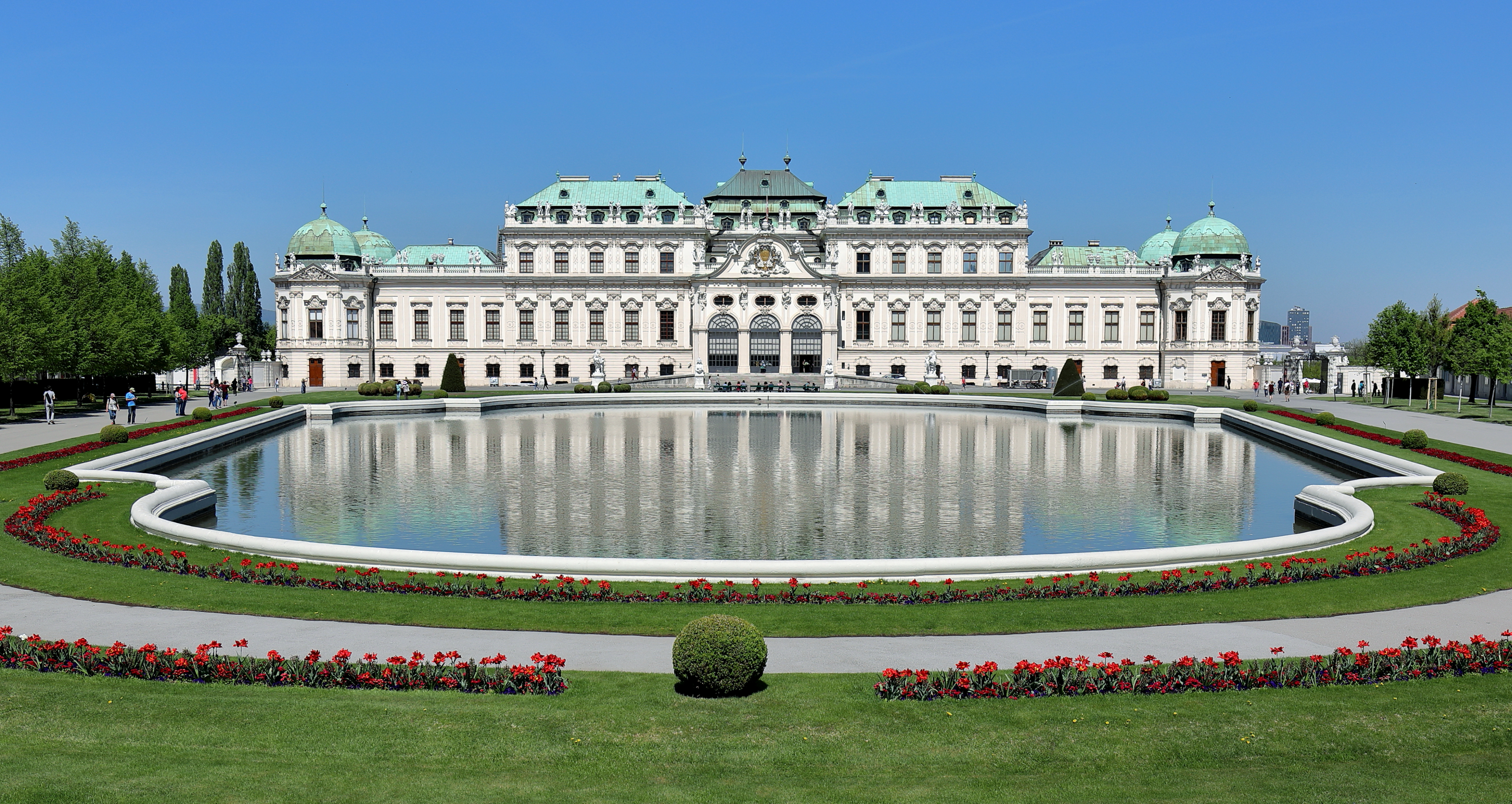
Pavilions at each end of the facade of the Upper Belvedere, Vienna

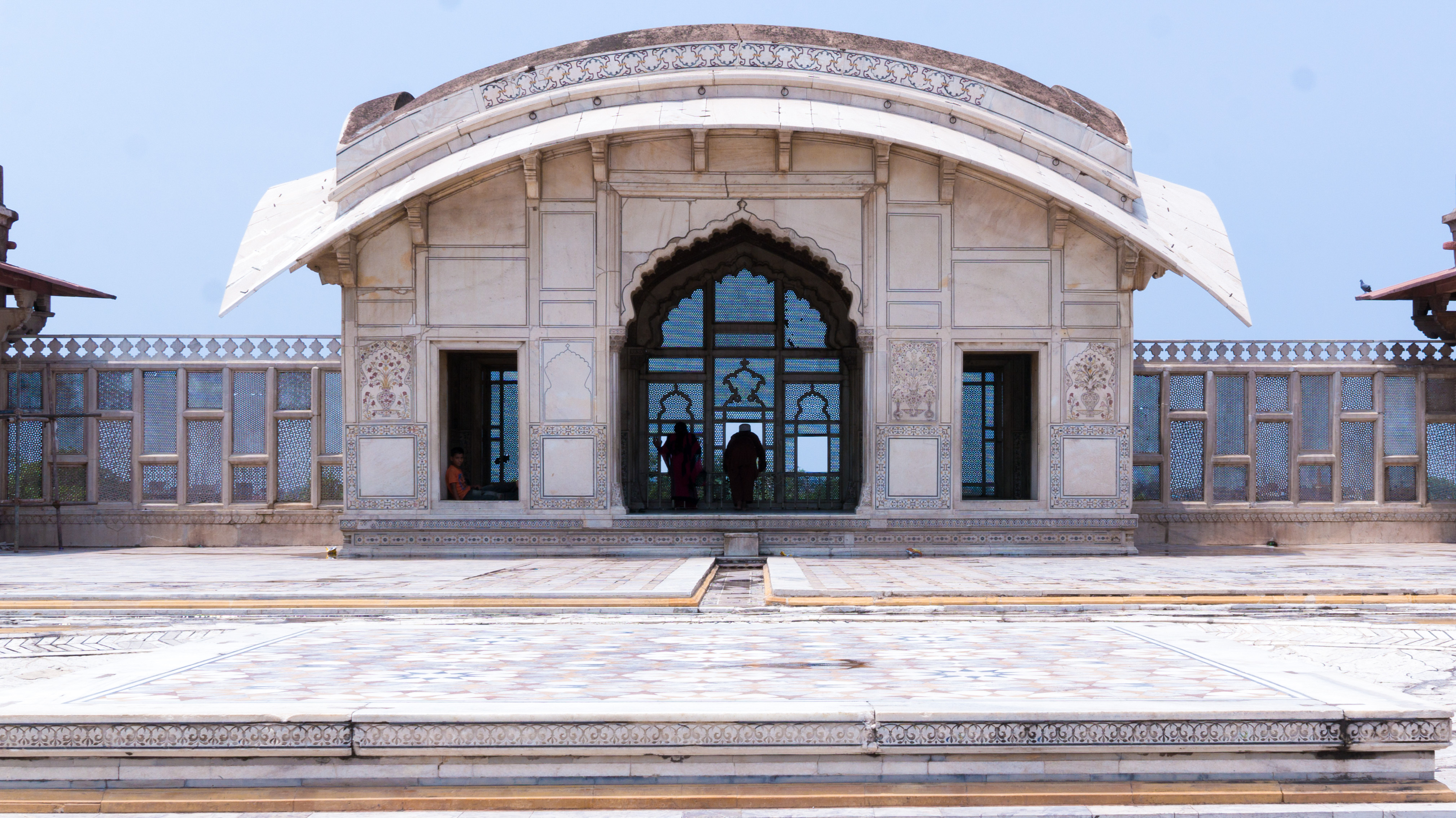
The white marbled Naulakha Pavilion at the Lahore Fort, Pakistan

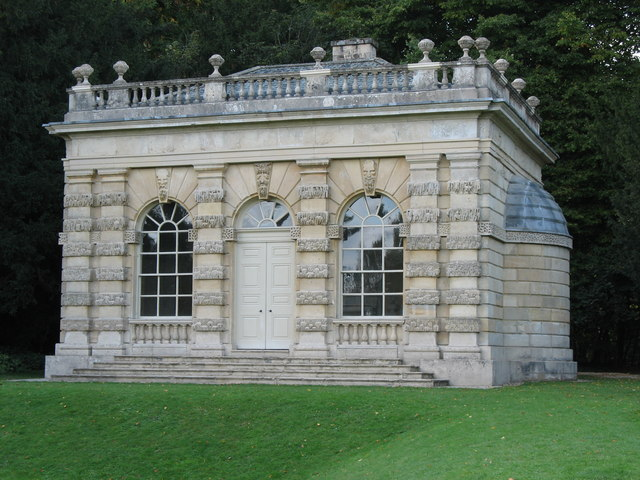
A banqueting house at Studley Royal Park

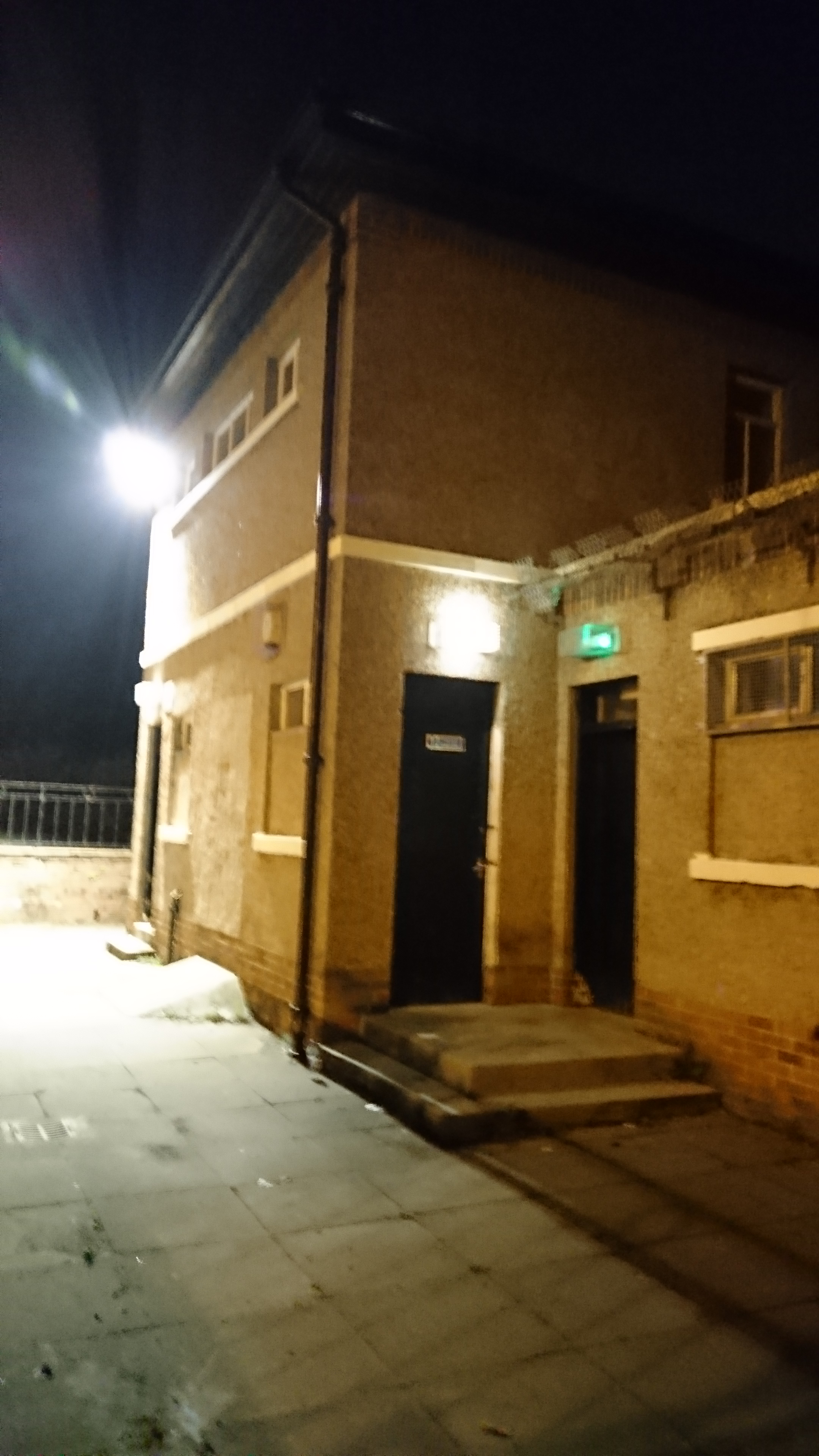
Woodfarm Pavilion, Glasgow. An example of a more common pavilion in an urban area.

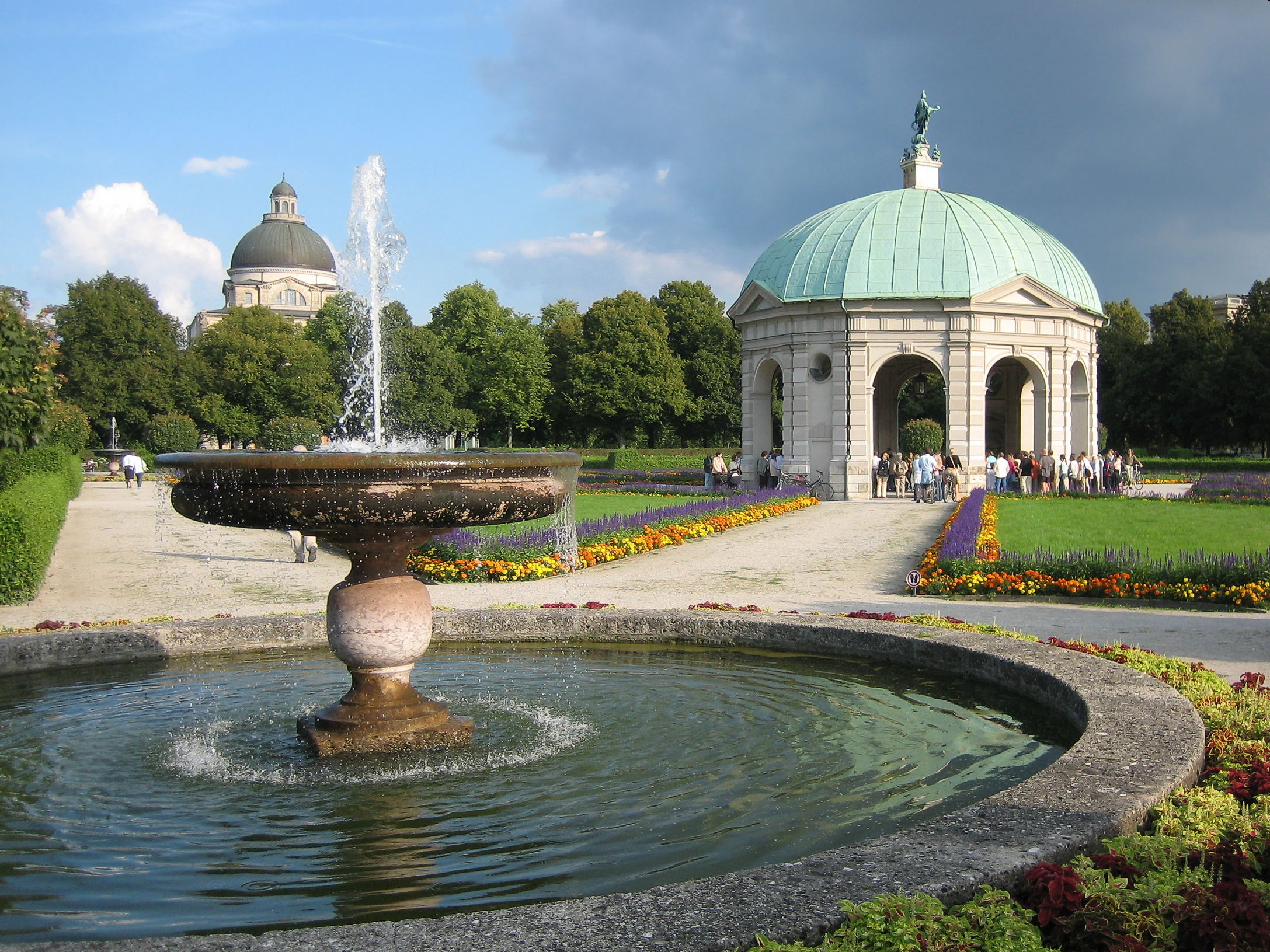
The Dianatempel (1613–1617), the Hofgarten, Bavaria

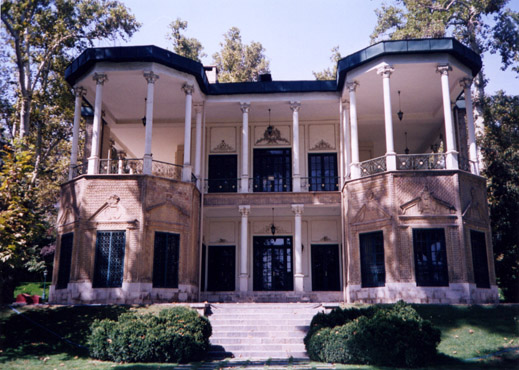
Ahmad Shahi Pavilion, the Niavaran Palace Complex, Tehran (19th century)

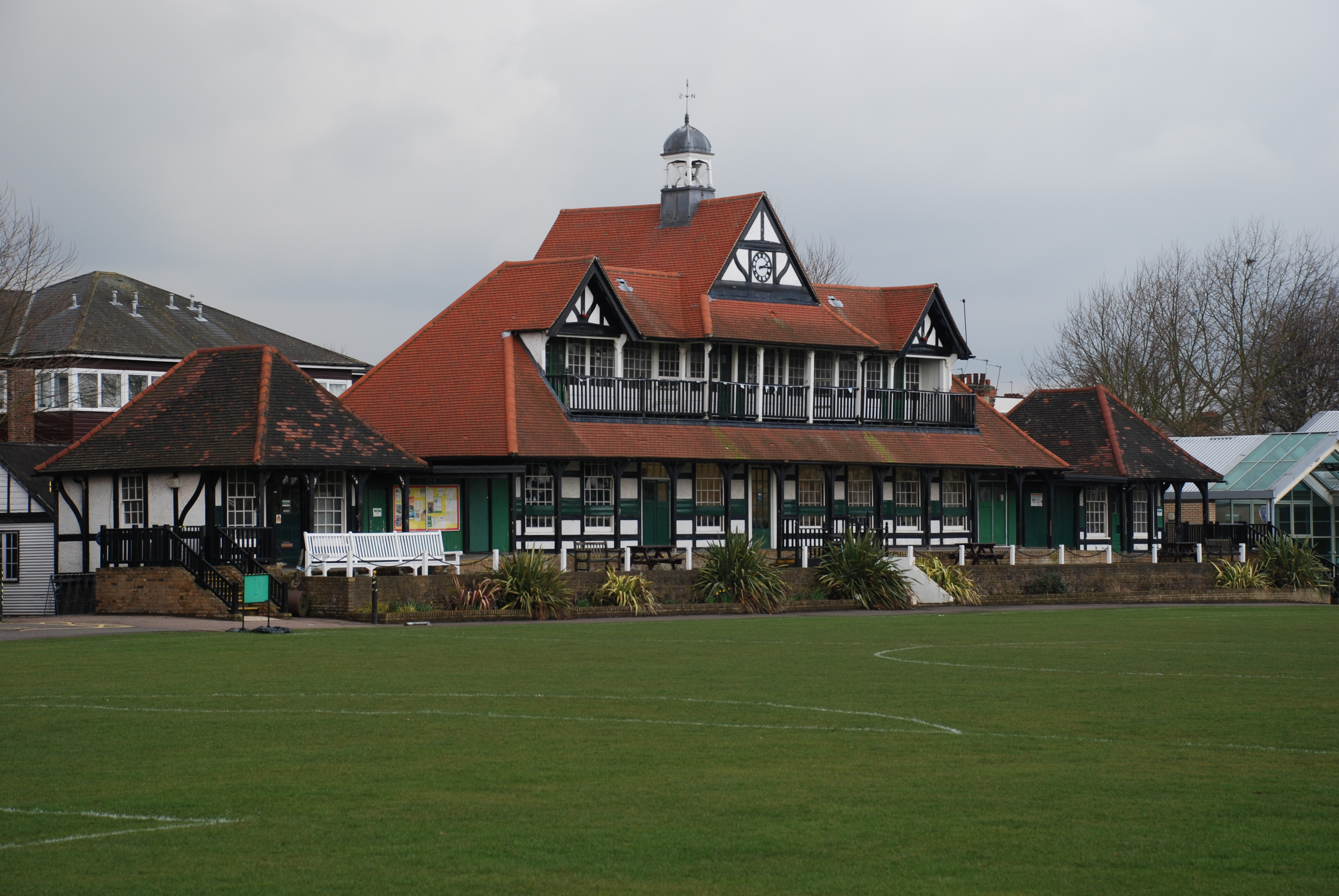
The wooden cricket pavilion at Leyton Cricket Ground in London (1886)

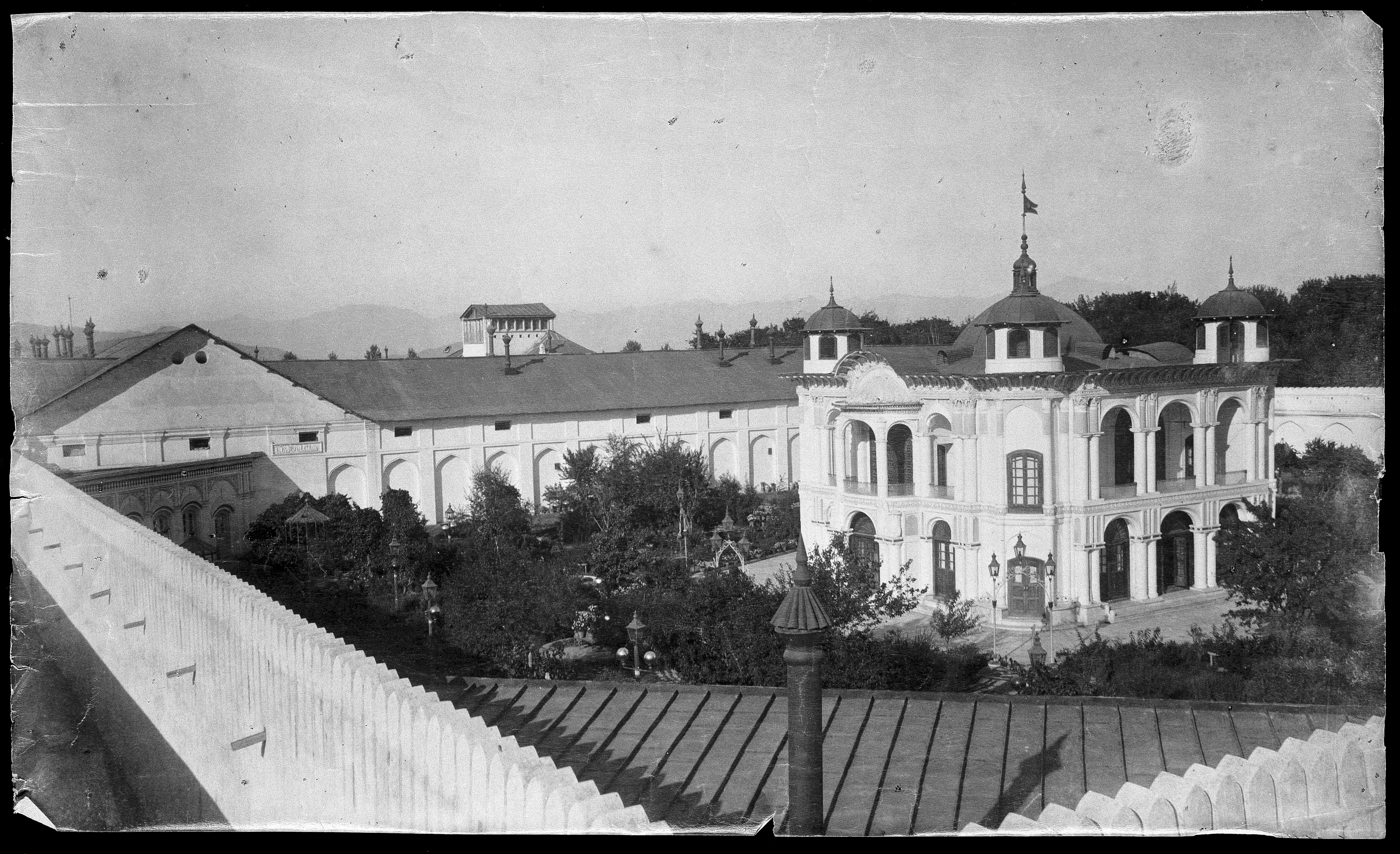
Abdur Rahman Khan's garden house inside the royal Arg Palace, Kabul (19th century)

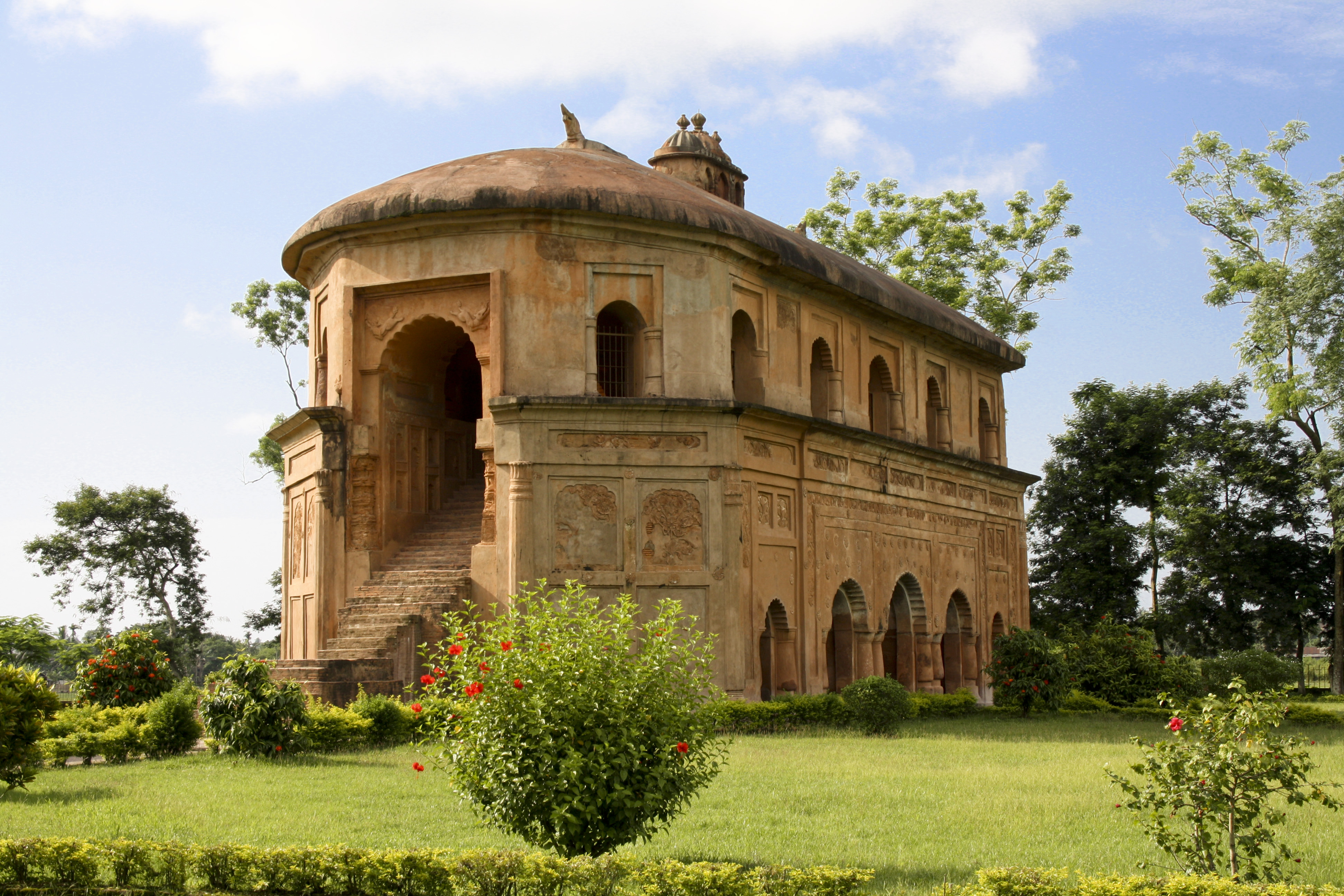
Rang Ghar, a sports-pavilion from Assam, India, built during Ahom kingdom (mid 18th century).

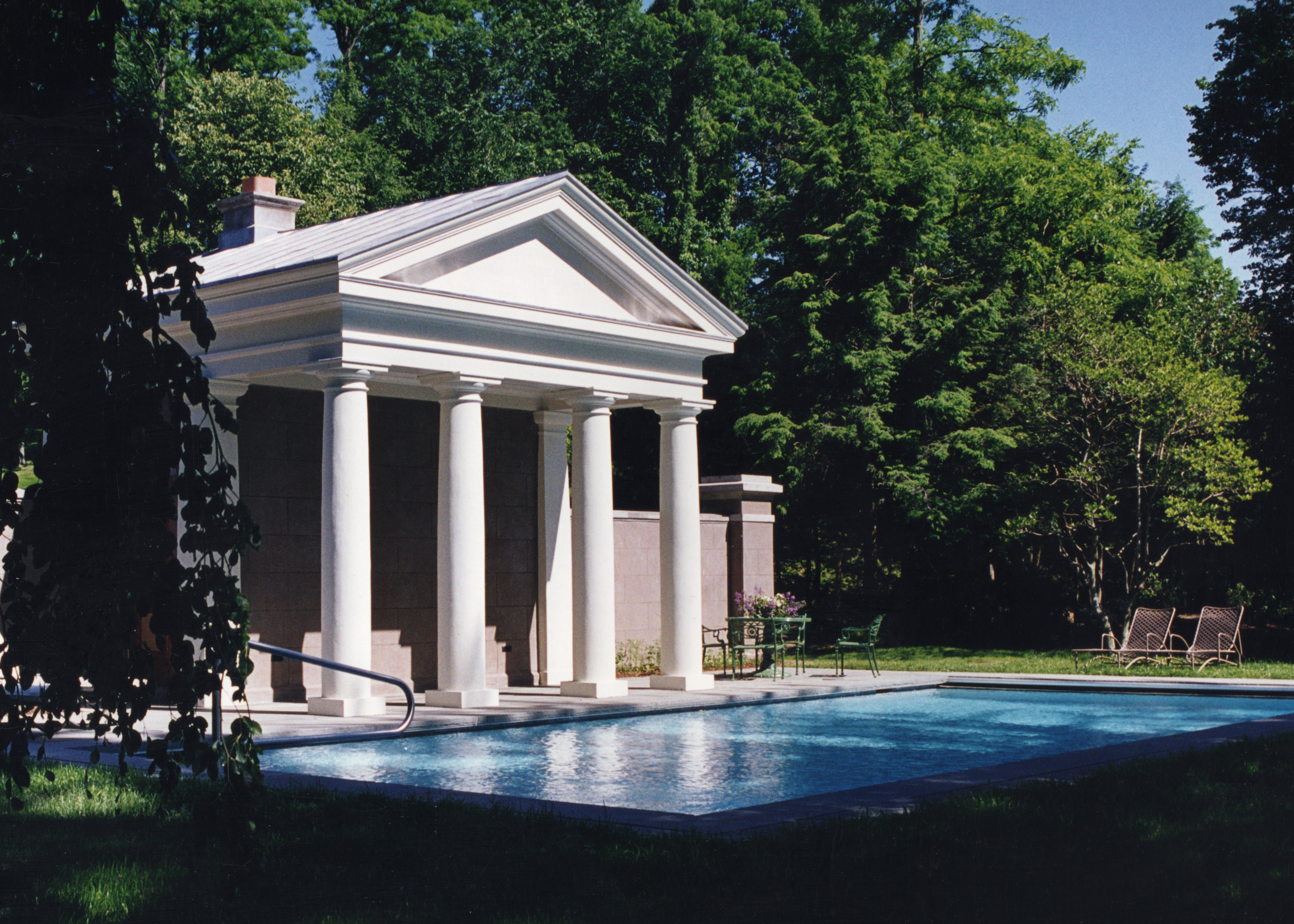
A poolhouse at Edgewater in Barrytown, New York, United States (1998)

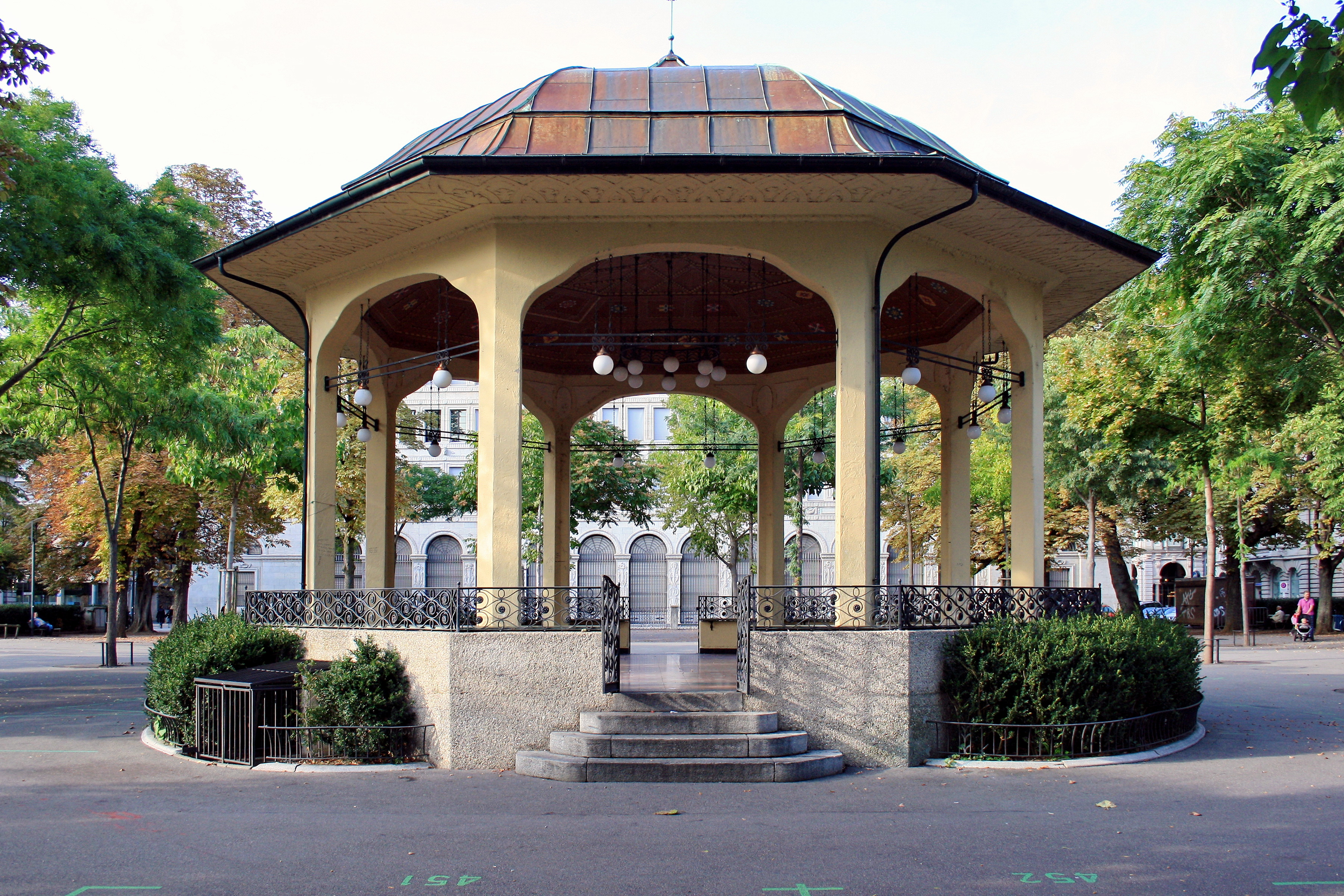
A bandstand (Musikpavillon) at Bürkliplatz in Zürich, Switzerland (1908)

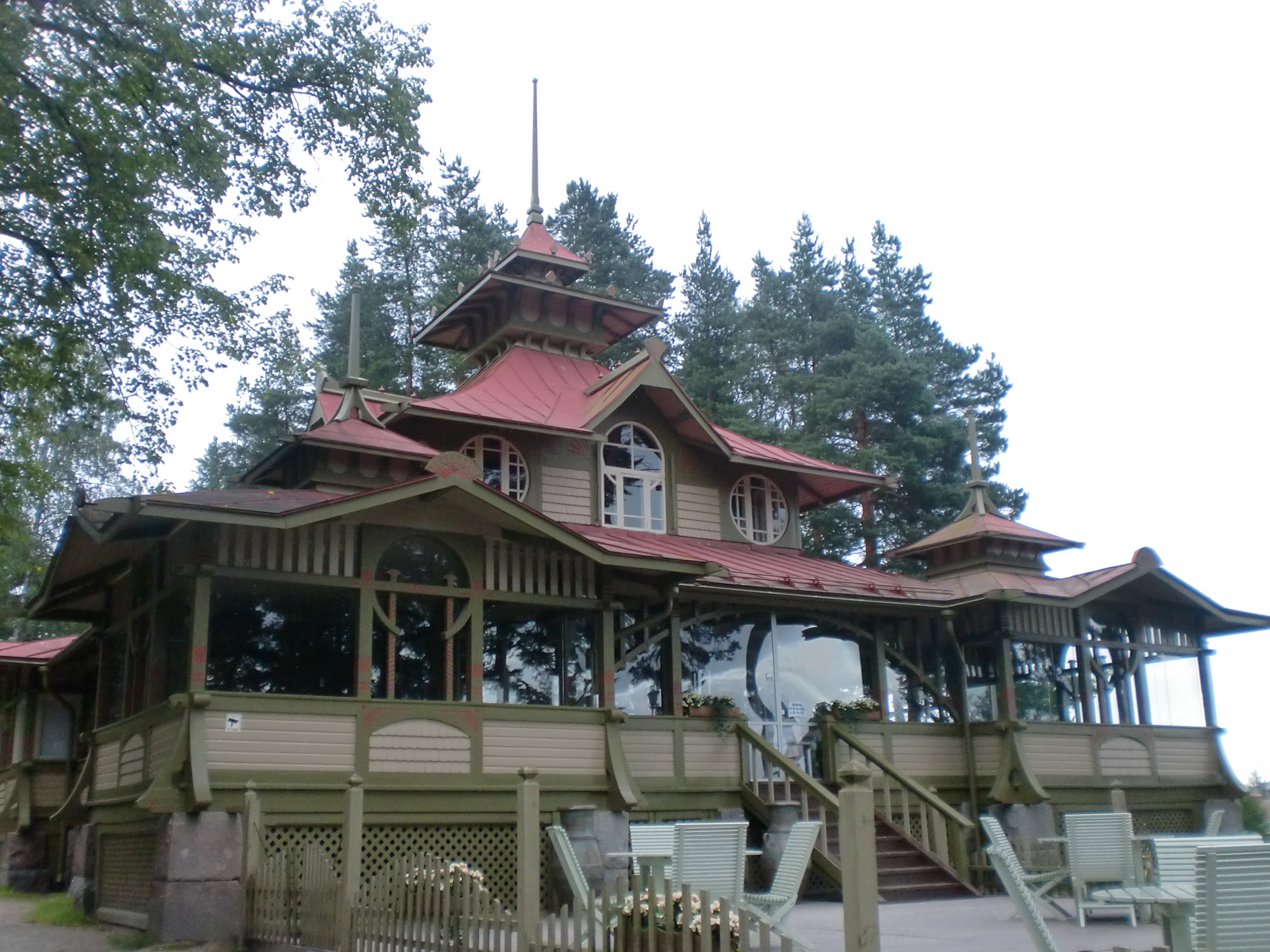
Rigde pavilion in Heinola, Finland

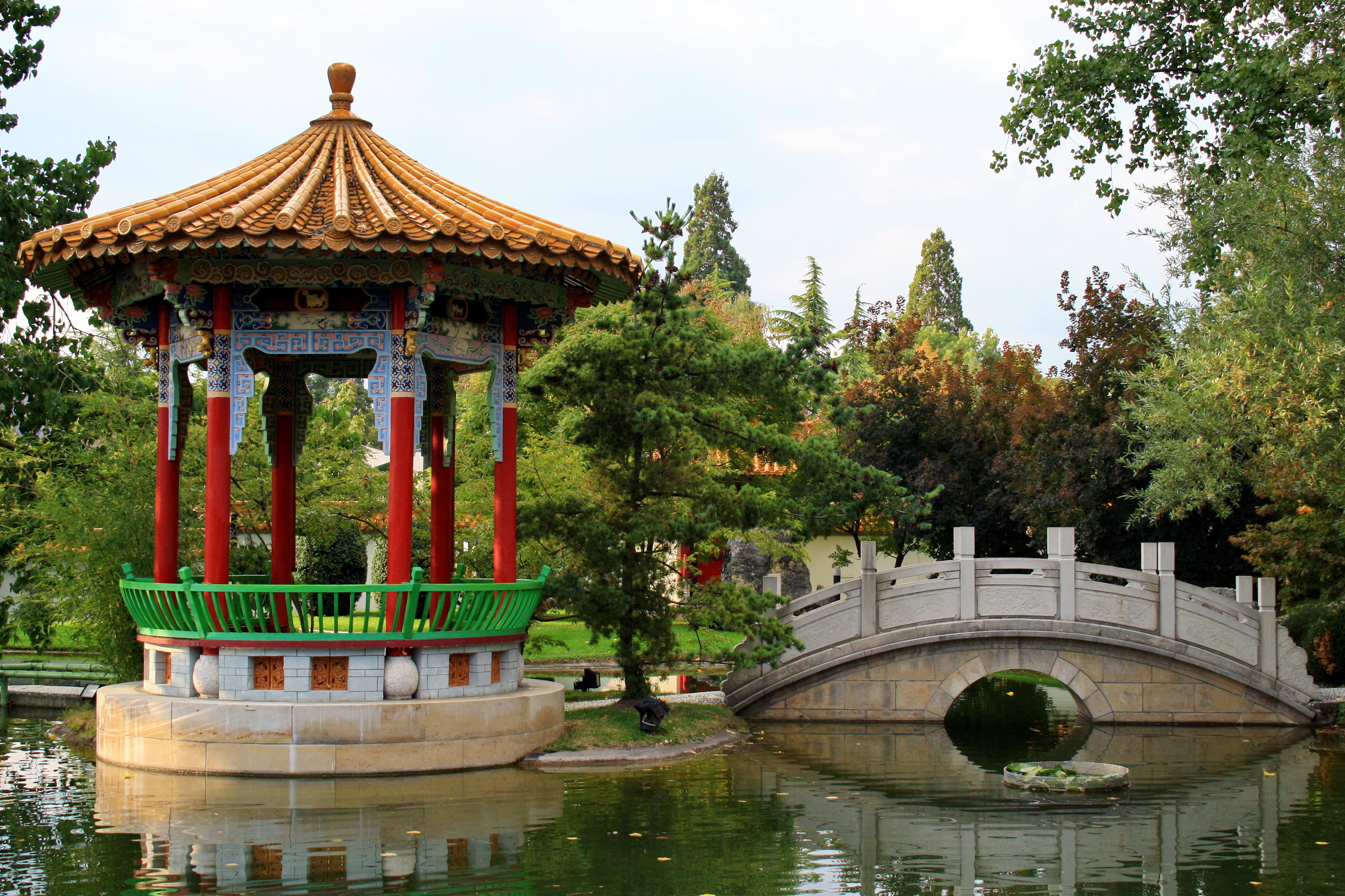
Island pavilion in the Chinese Garden, Zürich (1993)

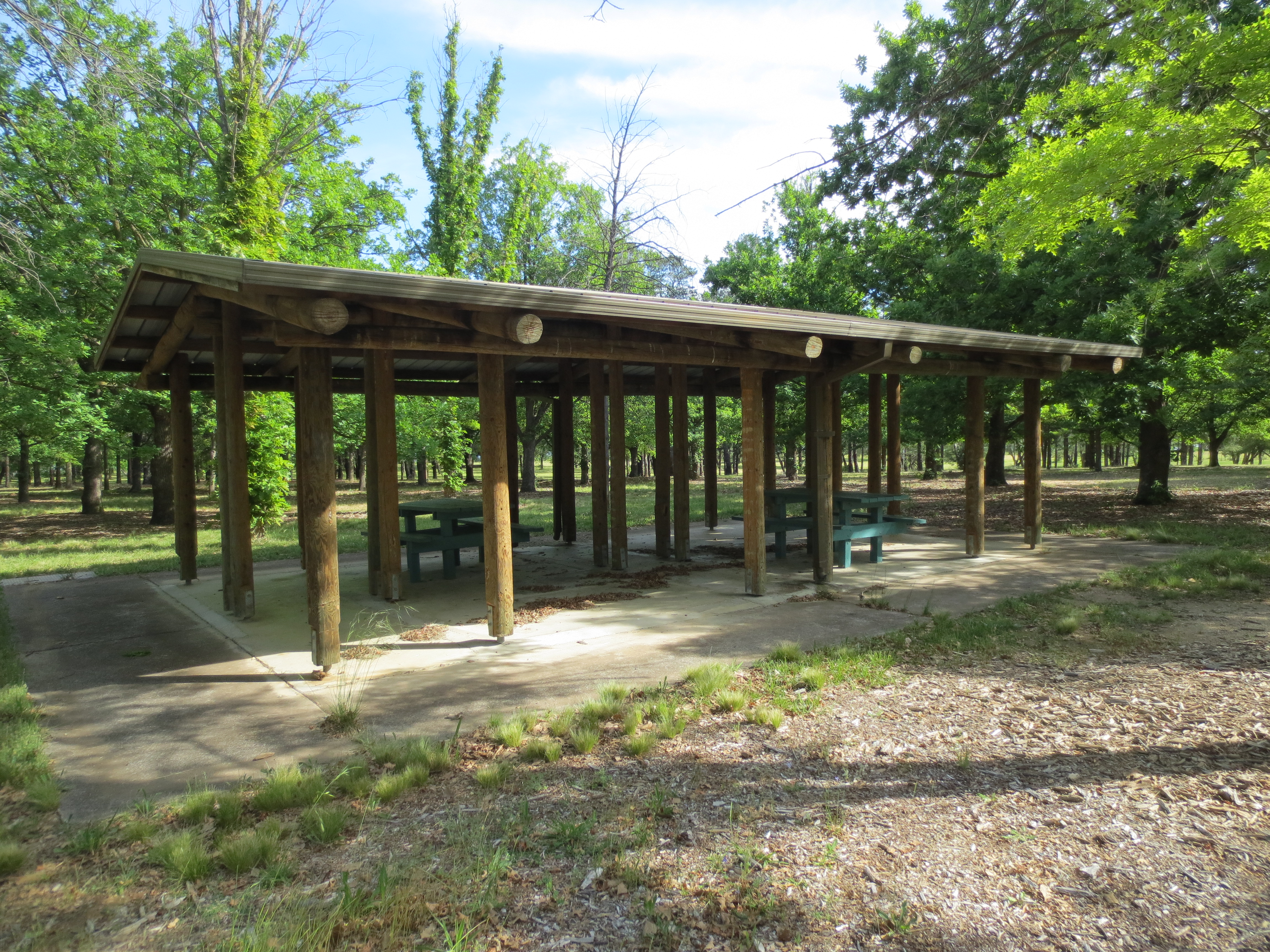
Picnic shelter, Yarramundi Reach, Canberra

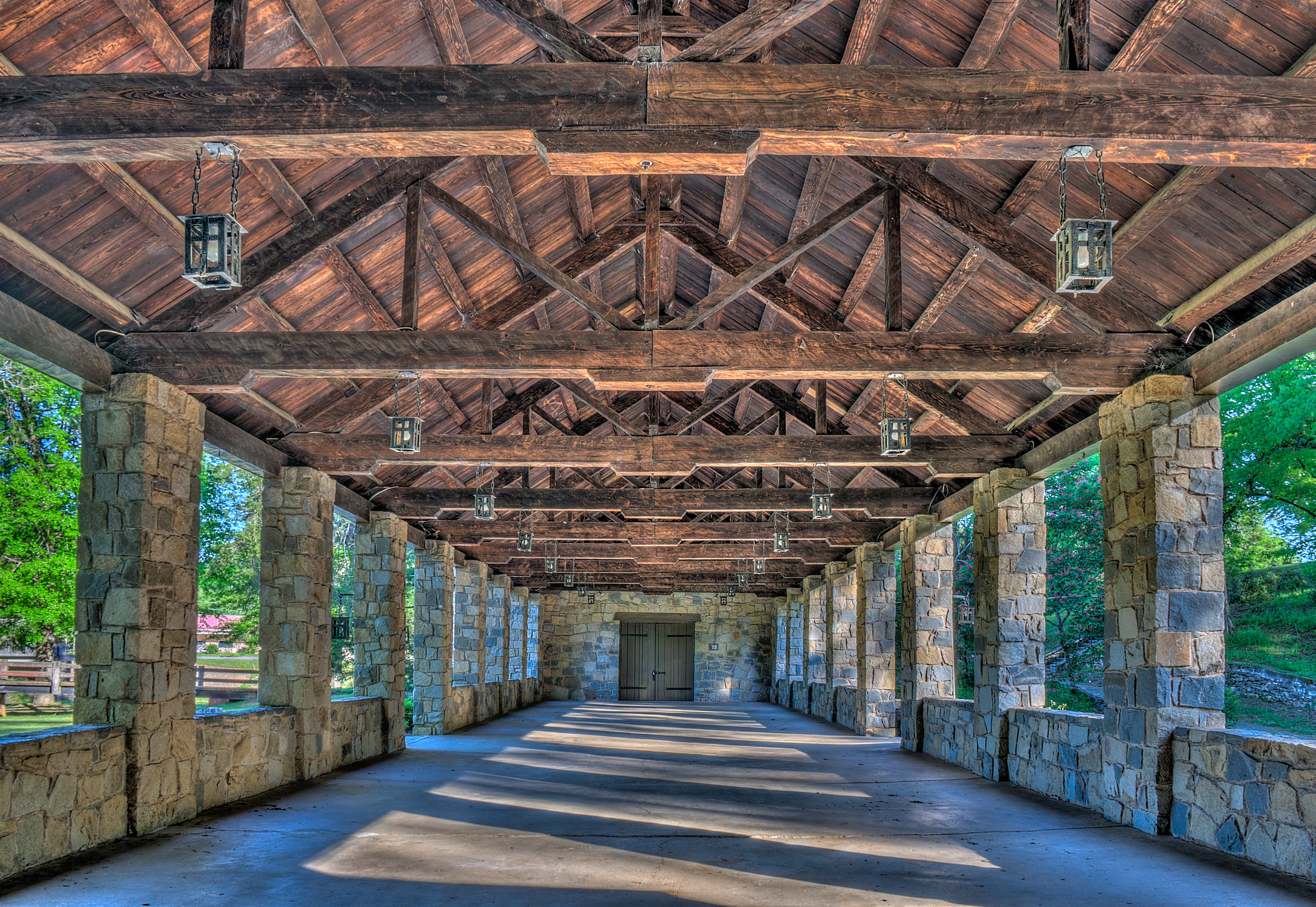
A stone pavilion, Indian Springs State Park, Georgia

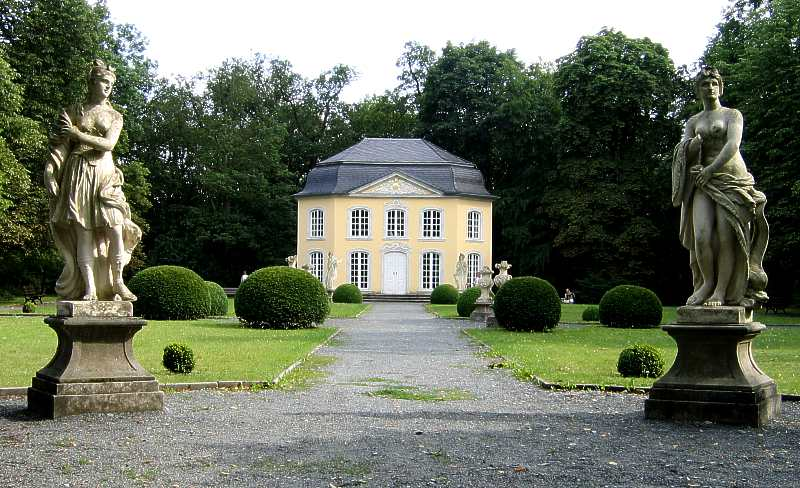
The Sophienlust Pavilion at Schloss Burgk in the Thuringian Highlands

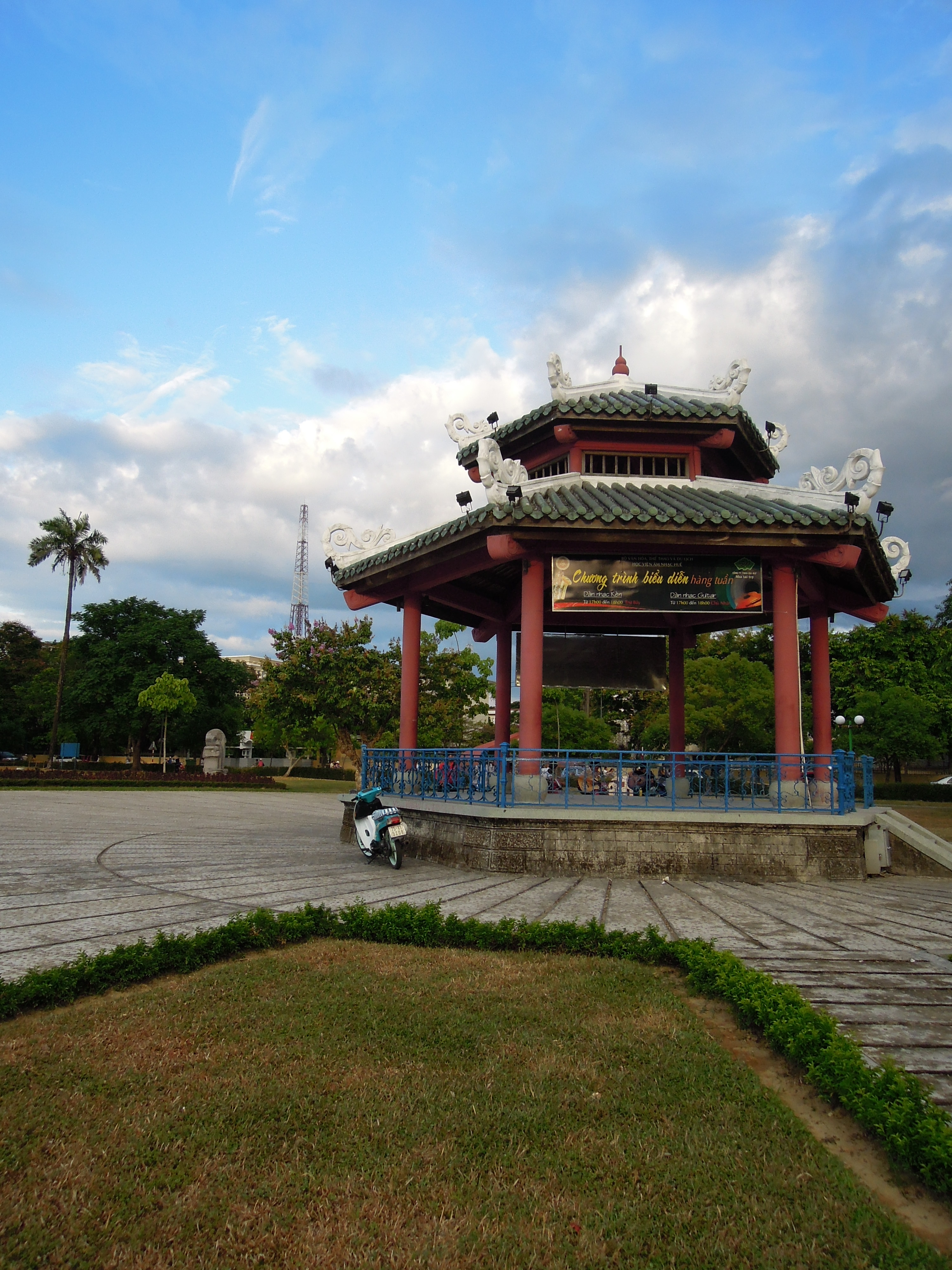
Pavilion in Huế, Vietnam

== See also ==
- Bandstand
- Chahartaq (Persian pavilion)
- Chinese pavilion
- Dance hall (dance pavilion)
- Dharamshala (type of building)
- Gazebo
- Mirror tent
- Monopteros
- Royal Pavilion, Brighton, England
- Sala Thai (Thai pavilion)
- World's fairs and similar events (art biennales, national fairs, etc.) use national pavilions
