= Hofgartenkaserne =

Coordinates: 48°8′32″N 11°34′59″E

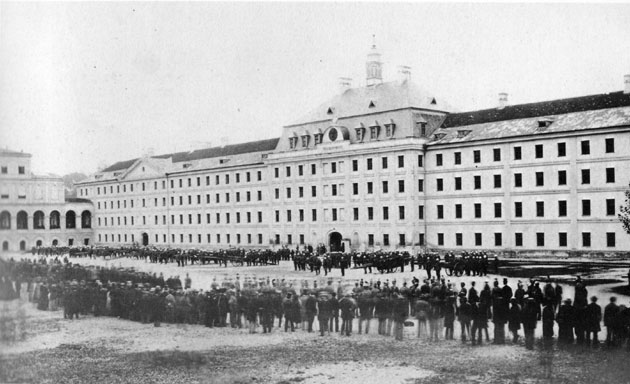
Hofgartenkaserne, c. 1870 (width: 189 m)

The Hofgartenkaserne, also known as Infanterie-Leibregiment-Kaserne or Max-Joseph-Kaserne, was a military facility of the Bavarian army, located at Hofgarten Strasse 2 in Munich, Germany. The construction was planned and realized by the war economy councillor Direktorialrat Joseph Frey from 1801 to 1807.

== History ==
Because the existing barracks of the Munich garrison had an unfavourable tactical location, and some of them fell into disrepair, Maximilian I Joseph of Bavaria decided to build the new kaserne at the northern outskirts of old Munich in the eastern Hofgarten, and a smaller one nearby, the Seidenhauskaserne.

Originally the Hofgartenkaserne, which was conceived for 1.800 people, should be built on the fundament of the old silk factory covering the city ditch at the eastern border of the Hofgarten. The large pond of the Hofgarten should be filled up for the later barrack yard. But in consequence of the millers' protests, who needed the ditch for their mill wheels, the foundation stone was laid more westwards over the quickly filled up pond in 1801. At first the 1st Lines Lifeguards Regiment moved into the four-storied building in 1804, but it was not completed until 1807. The total costs of construction were 256.629 Gulden. On the occasion of completion, in 1801 the Bavarian medailleur and punchcutter Cajetan Destouches (C.D.; born 1769 – died 1833 in Munich) edited a medal in honor of Maximilian I Joseph.

The Hofgartenkaserne was never fully occupied. The conditions inside the building soon turned out to be unhealthy. It was assumed, that the subsoil below the building was too boggy because the filled-up pond was not drained enough before its construction. The inhabitants suffered consistently from illness, and the cases of typhoid were also considered as a result. Due to the epidemic in the Hofgarten- and the Seidenhauskaserne in 1893, when 34 lifeguards died and 8 became invalid, a meeting of scientists, physicians, military, engineers and representatives of the city was scheduled to clarify the reasons. Chairman of the meeting was the Bavarian minister of war Adolph von Asch. Due to a missing uniform conclusion, von Asch decided to apply for closing the barracks at the prince regent, who accepted the motion on July 18, 1893. The Hofgartenkaserne was fully evacuated in the end of the same year, the Lehel-Kaserne and the Seidenhauskaserne a view years later. After the army's plan to sell the building was jettisoned in 1898, the building slated for demolition in 1899 to make way for an army museum.

The Bavarian Army Museum, which was built a few steps more westwards on a new fundament after 1901, was opened in 1905 and existed until the end of World War II. The building remained in ruins. The central dome building was rebuilt and is the central part of today's Bayerische Staatskanzlei (State Chancellery), which was completed in 1993.
