= Dianatempel (Munich) =

Gazebo in the Hofgarten of Munich, Germany

Coordinates: 48°08′35″N 11°34′48″E

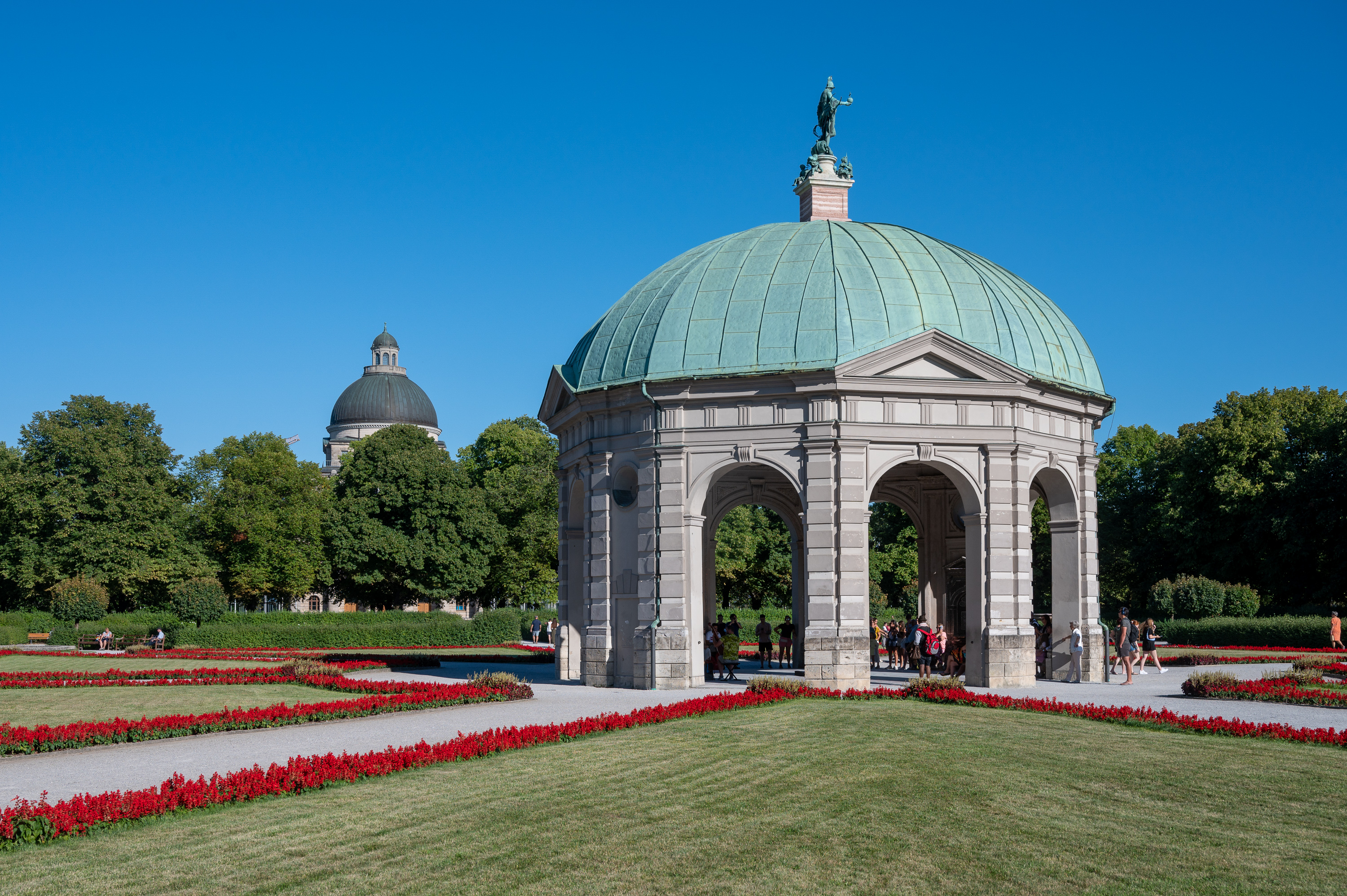
Diana Temple in the center of the Munich Hofgarten

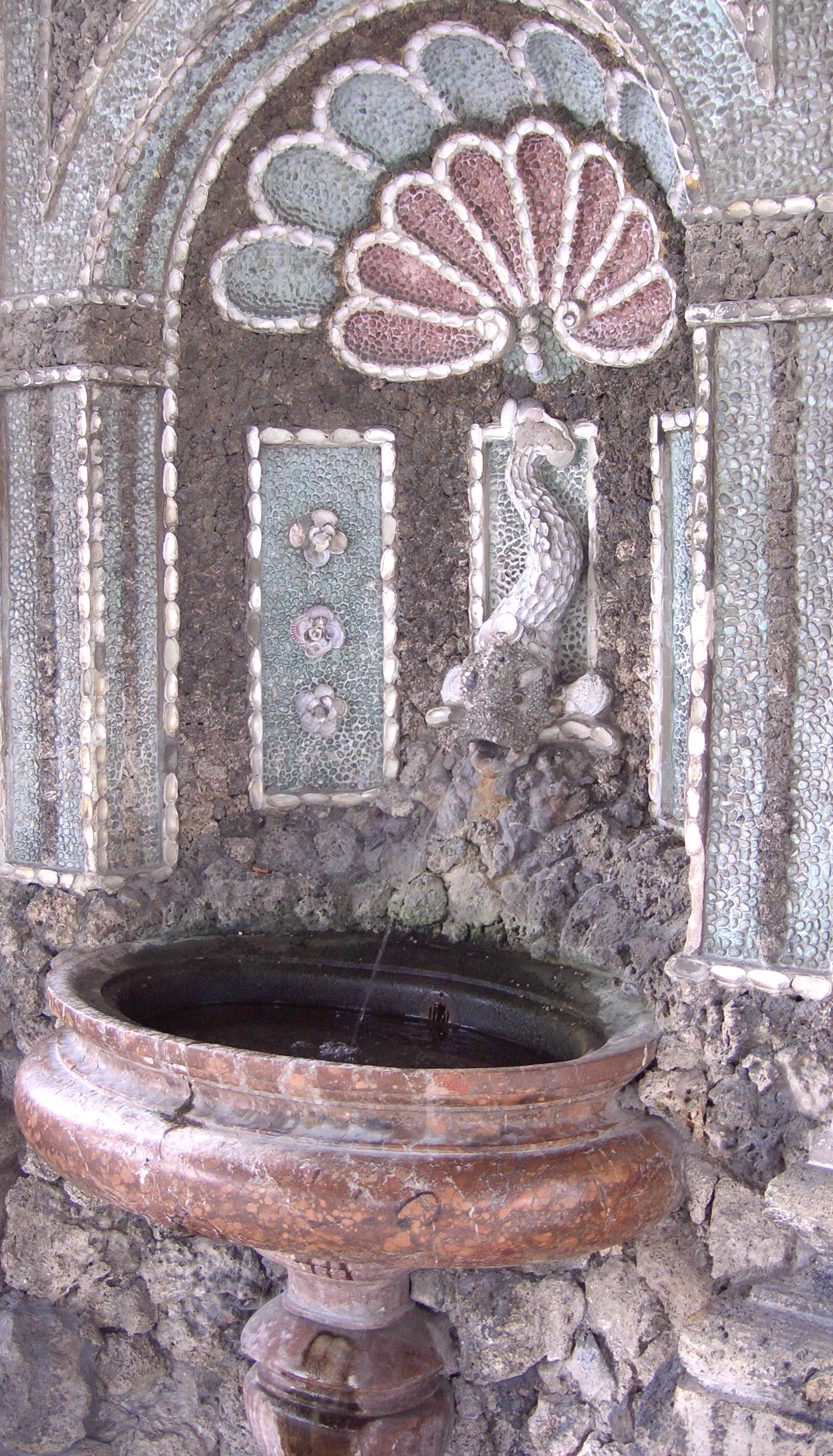
Shell Fountain in the Diana Temple

The Diana Temple in the Munich Hofgarten, the garden of the Munich Residenz, is a twelve-sided gazebo from the Renaissance period with eight open and four closed round arcades. It is the crossing point of the main and diagonal axes of the Hofgarten.

== History ==
The Diana Temple was created in 1613–1617 in Italian style together with the Hofgarten and goes back to Maximilian I, Elector of Bavaria. The temple forms the center of the garden and was probably created by Heinrich Schön around the year 1615.

On it is a famous bronze figure, a copy of the Bavaria bronze statue of Hubert Gerhard. The original can be found in the Residenzmuseum. The bronze figure that crowns the roof was created in 1594 by Hans Krumpper and symbolizes the riches of Bavaria.

In the temple itself, four wall mounted shell fountains can be found.

== Use ==
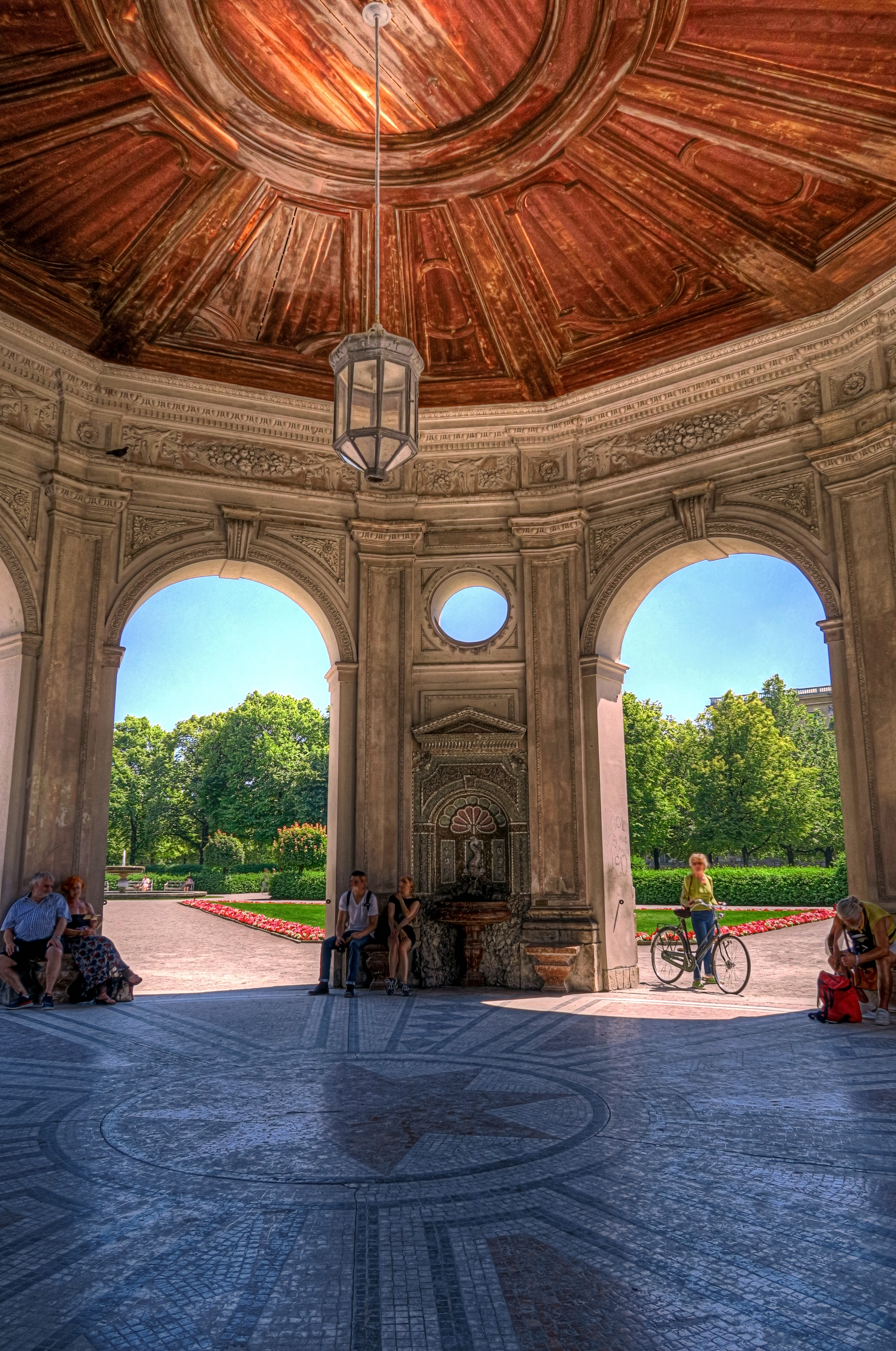
View through the round arches with floor mosaic and ceiling design

Like the whole Hofgarten, the Diana Temple is usually open to the public. Exceptions are rare, such as when it was used as a backdrop for filming (for example, The Three Musketeers (2011)), and the access from Odeonsplatz is occasionally not possible during major events (for example Klassik am Odeonsplatz).

Concerts are held in the pavilion and street musicians entertain the park visitors; In the summer evenings, it serves as an unofficial and informal meeting place for dancers (Forró, Tango Argentino, salsa and swing). These non-commercial events are tolerated as long as there is no noise disturbance to residents or harassment of other visitors. On a sunny Sunday afternoon, sometimes a crowd of people form to watch the dancers.

For such uses, an agreement with the Bavarian Administration of State-Owned Palaces, Gardens and Lakes, which assigns in particular the permits for the street musicians is required.
