= Hofgarten (Munich) =

Garden in Munich, Germany

Coordinates: 48°08′34″N 11°34′48″E

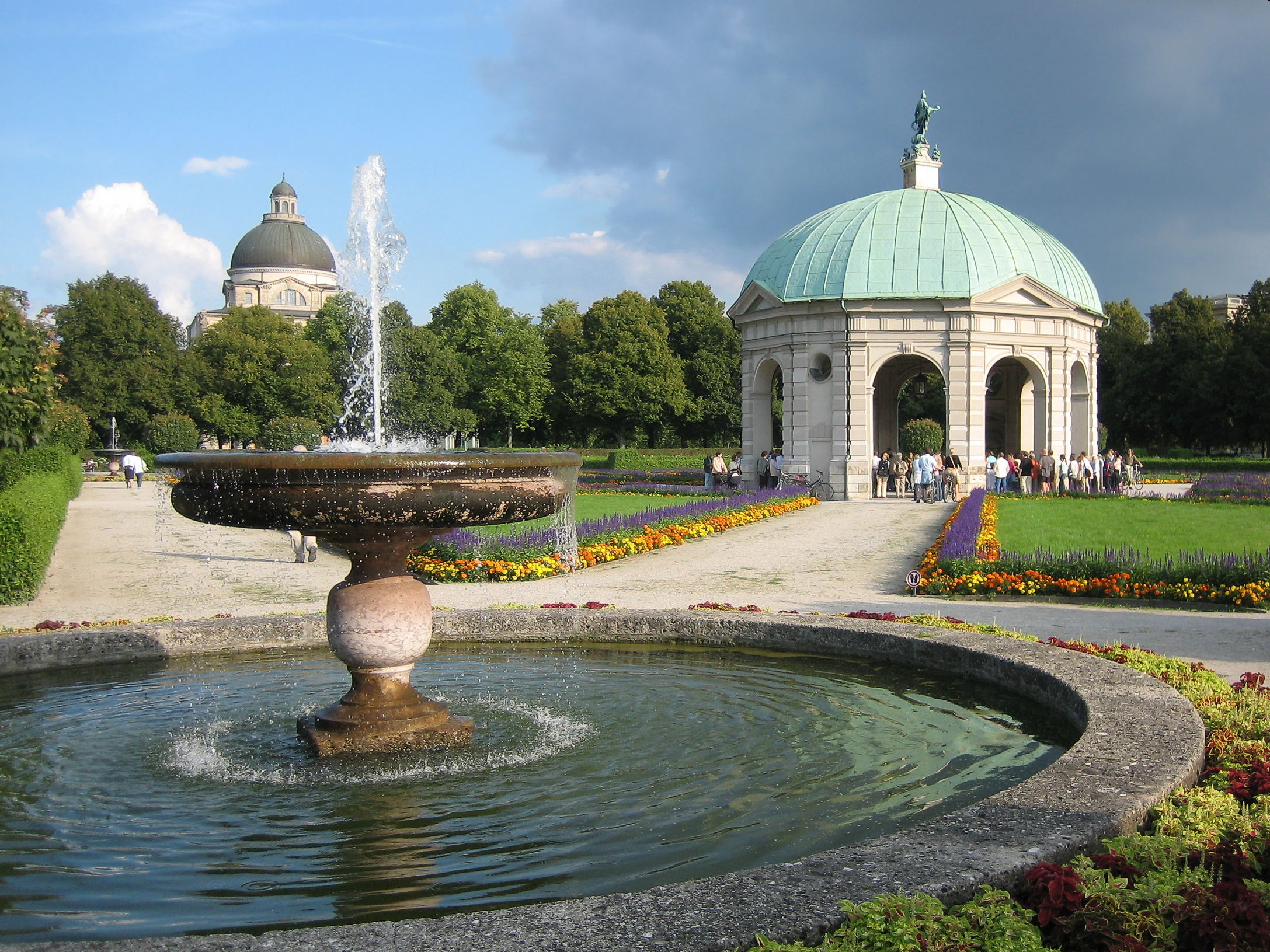
Hofgarten temple and fountain

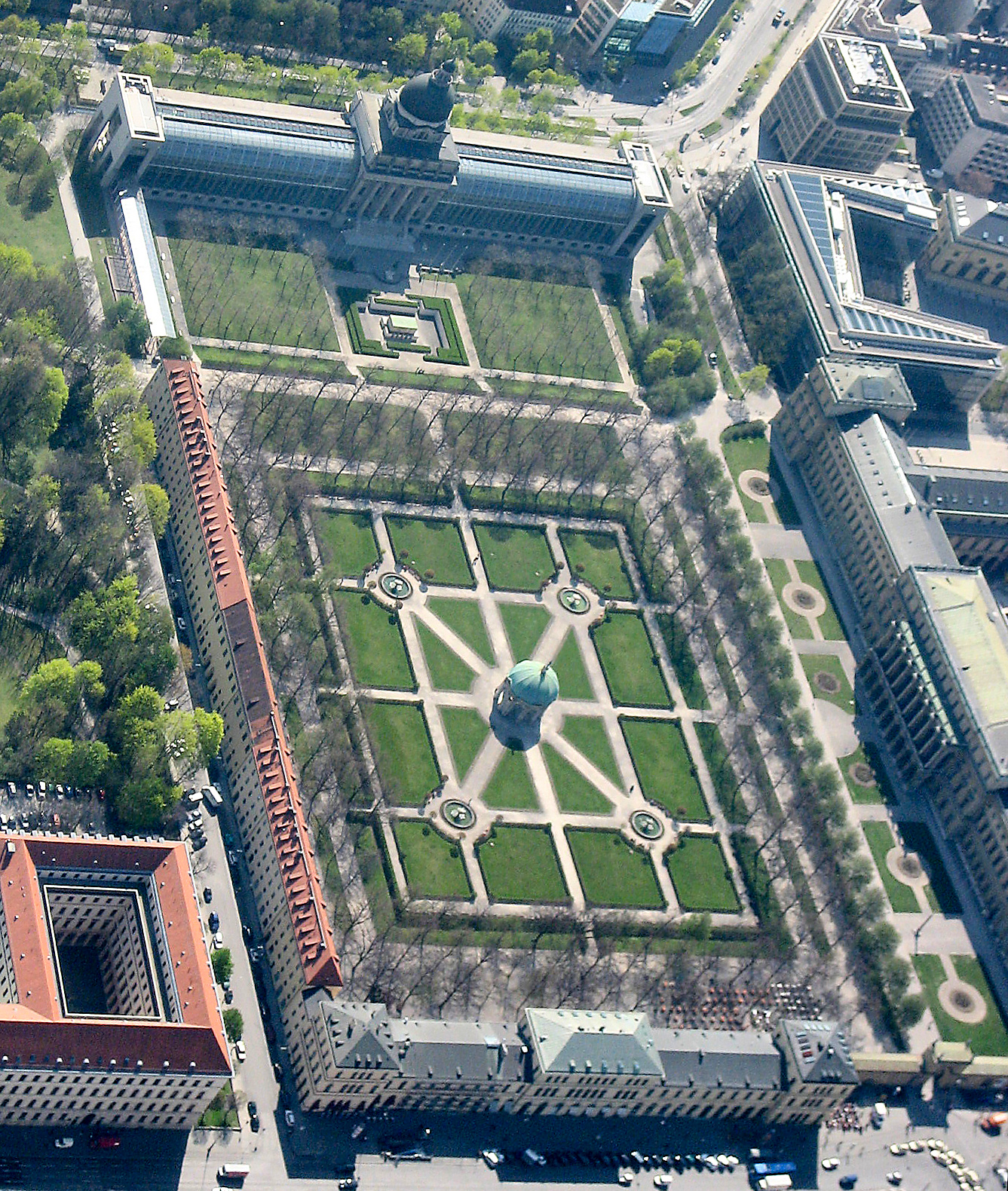
Aerial view, Bavarian Staatskanzlei at top, Munich Residenz on right, temple of Diana at center

The Hofgarten (Court Garden) is a garden in the center of Munich, Germany, located between the Residenz and the Englischer Garten.

== History ==
The garden was built in 1613–1617 by Maximilian I, Elector of Bavaria in the style of Italian Renaissance garden. In the center of the garden is a pavilion for the goddess Diana, built-in 1615 by Heinrich Schön the elder. A path leads from each of the eight arches. On the roof of the Diana pavilion, is the replica of a sculpture of Bavaria by Hubert Gerhard, created in 1623. The original is in the Kaisersaal of the Residenz.

Facing the Hofgarten on the east side is the Bavarian Staatskanzlei ("State Chancellery"), housed in the former Army Museum, with the addition of glass wings left and right of the original building. The repurposed building was completed in 1993. A few steps more eastwards the Hofgartenkaserne was located from 1801 to 1899. In front of the Staatskanzlei, the Kriegerdenkmal ("war memorial") is located, built for commemoration of the Munich people killed in action in World War I.

In the north east corner, a square black granite memorial stands to the White Rose group, whose members were executed for a nonviolent campaign against Hitler's regime.

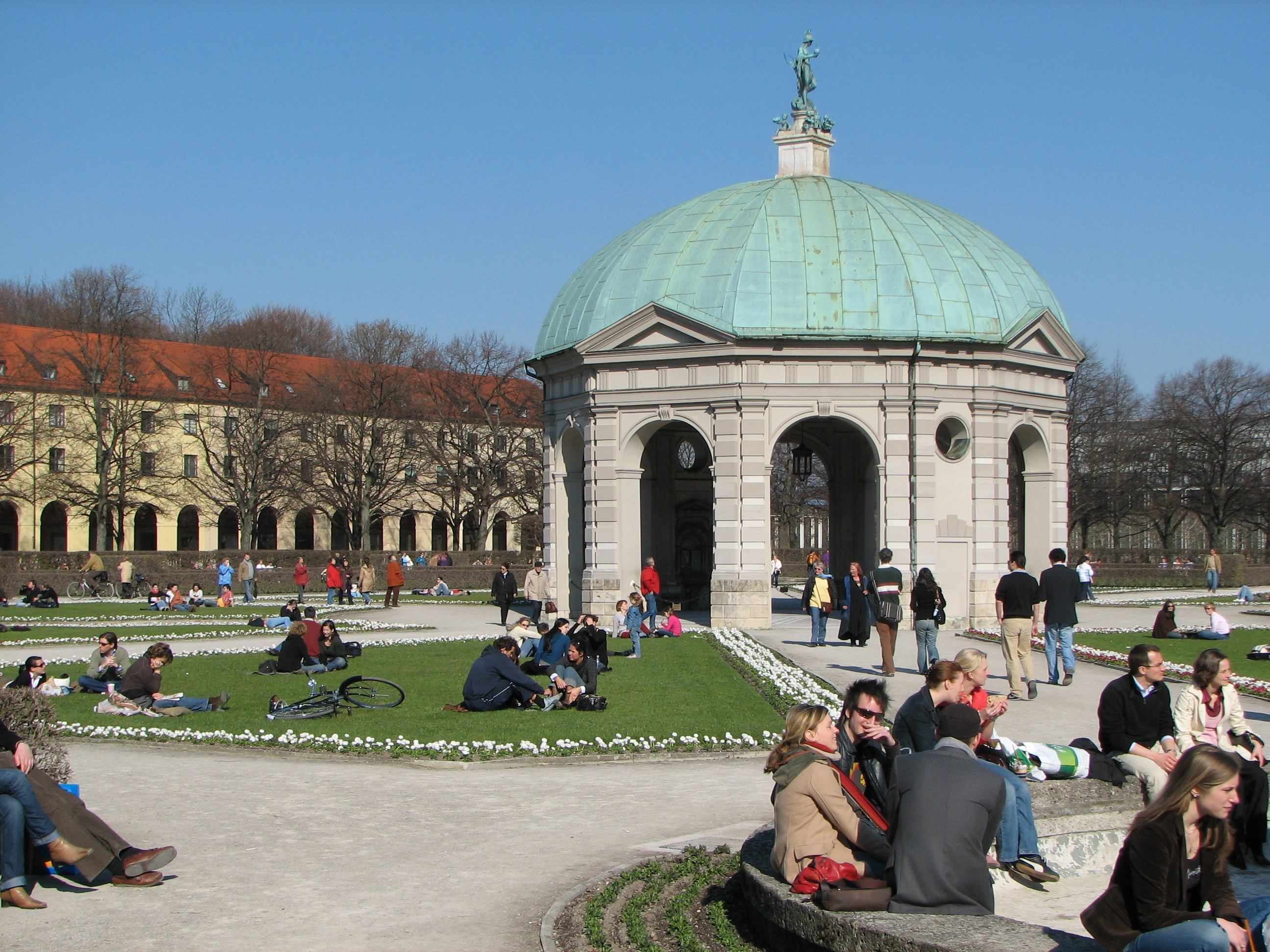
The Hofgarten is a very popular spot, shown here on the first sunny weekend in spring.

The south side towards the Residenz includes flowers in a design by Carl Effner from 1853, with arcades to the west and the north, including many wall paintings related to the history of Bavaria. To the west, the Hofgartentor ("Court Garden Gate") leads towards the Theatinerkirche. Built in 1816, it is the first work in Munich by Leo von Klenze.

The garden was destroyed during World War II, and was rebuilt with a partial redesign which compromised between the landscape garden character it had acquired in the nineteenth century and the original formal design of the seventeenth century.

Nowadays the garden is open to the public, and is very popular with both residents and tourists alike. The nearest Munich U-Bahn station is Odeonsplatz, located directly west of the garden.
