= Kriegerdenkmal im Hofgarten (Munich) =

War memorial in the Hofgarten, Munich, Germany

Coordinates: 48.1425°N 11.5819°E

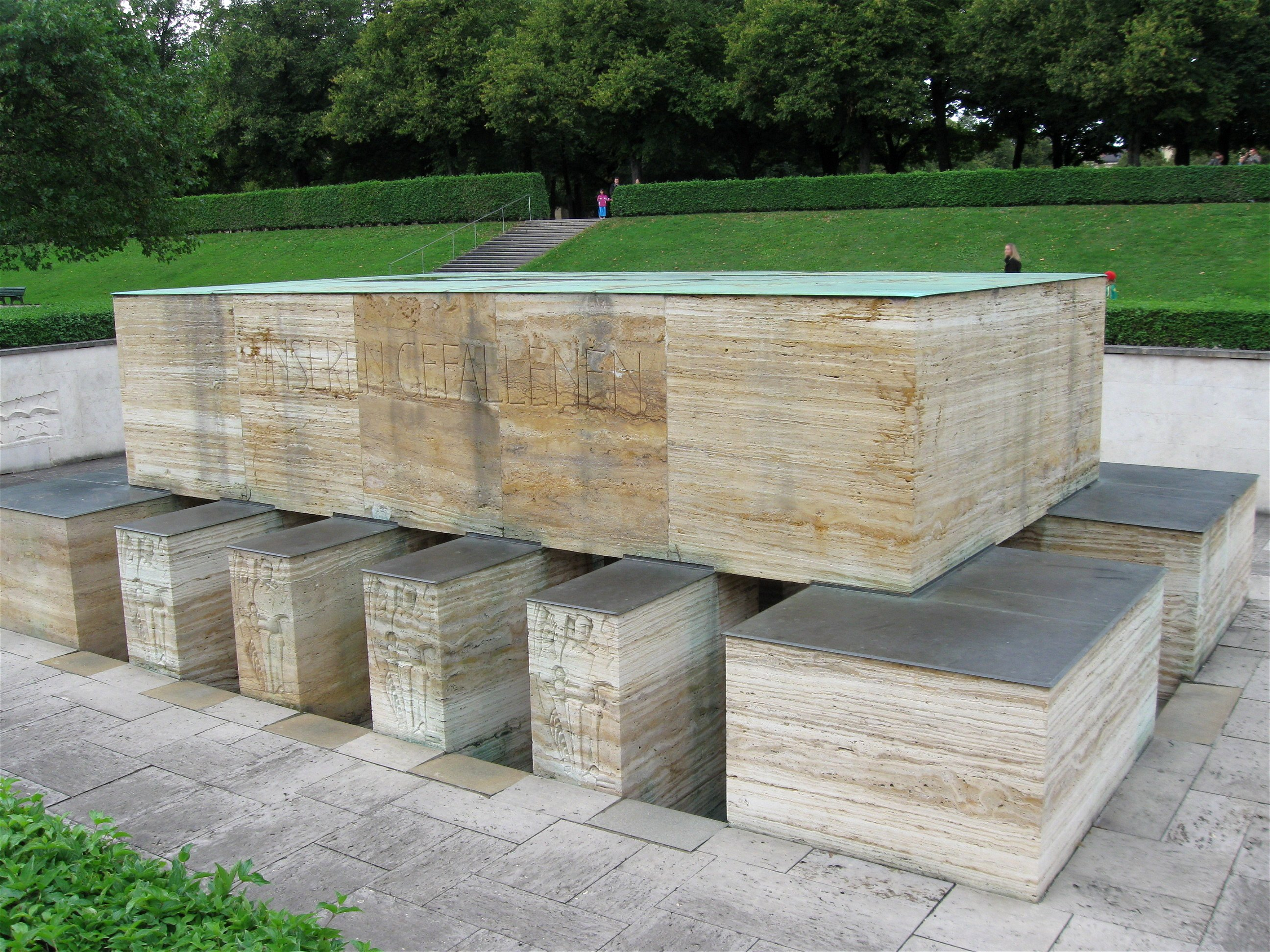
Kriegerdenkmal im Hofgarten

The Kriegerdenkmal ("warrior memorial") in the Hofgarten in Munich was built for commemorating those killed in action in World War I from Munich. It is located on the eastern end of the Hofgarten, in front of the Bayerische Staatskanzlei.

== Construction ==
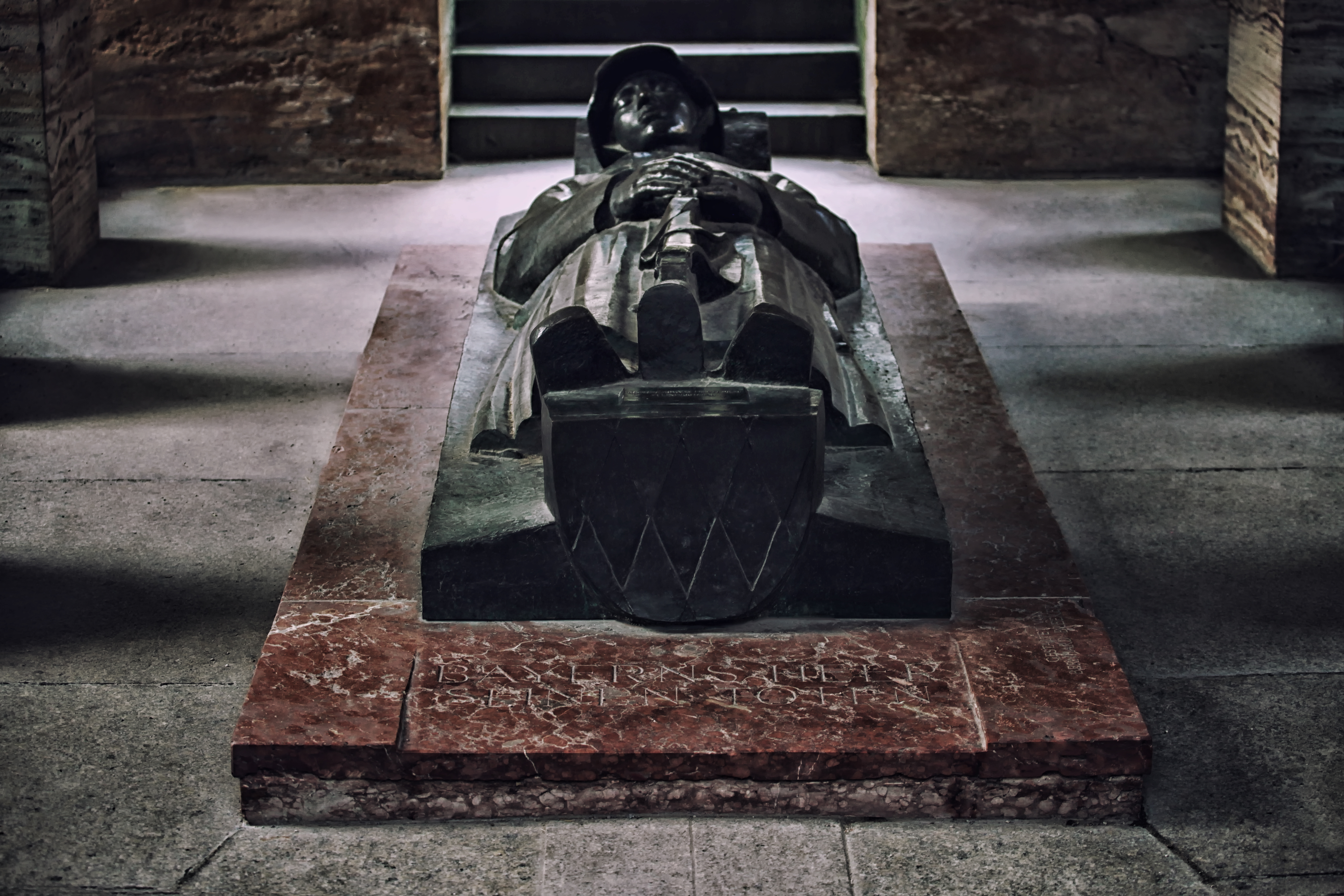
Statue of the fallen soldier, inside the crypt

In the middle of a rectangular pit an open crypt is located, containing the statue of a fallen soldier.

The 2.25 meters deep pit measures 28×17 meters and is clad in Muschelkalk. Four cornered stairs lead down into it. On the north Muschelkalk wall of this outer room is a relief of marching soldiers and in contrast, the southern wall has a relief of a burial ground.
The crypt itself consists of 12 blocks of stone which carry a 2 meters thick and 250 tons heavy roof panel. The stones form a room of 7.30×3.50 meters. 12 stairs – 5 on each long side and 1 on each short side – each one with 7 steps, lead down to the larger-than-life size monument of the fallen soldier.

The memorial was designed by sculptor Karl Knappe and the architects Thomas Wechs and Eberhard Finsterwalder. Bernhard Bleeker created the monument of the fallen soldier and its base of red marble. The original marble statue was replaced by a bronze cast in 1972, made by Thomas Wimmer, and is now exhibited in the Bavarian Army museum in Ingolstadt.

Rupprecht, Crown Prince of Bavaria, the son of the last Bavarian King, inaugurated the memorial site in 1924. However, it was only entirely finished in 1928. It is now a cultural heritage.

== Inscriptions ==
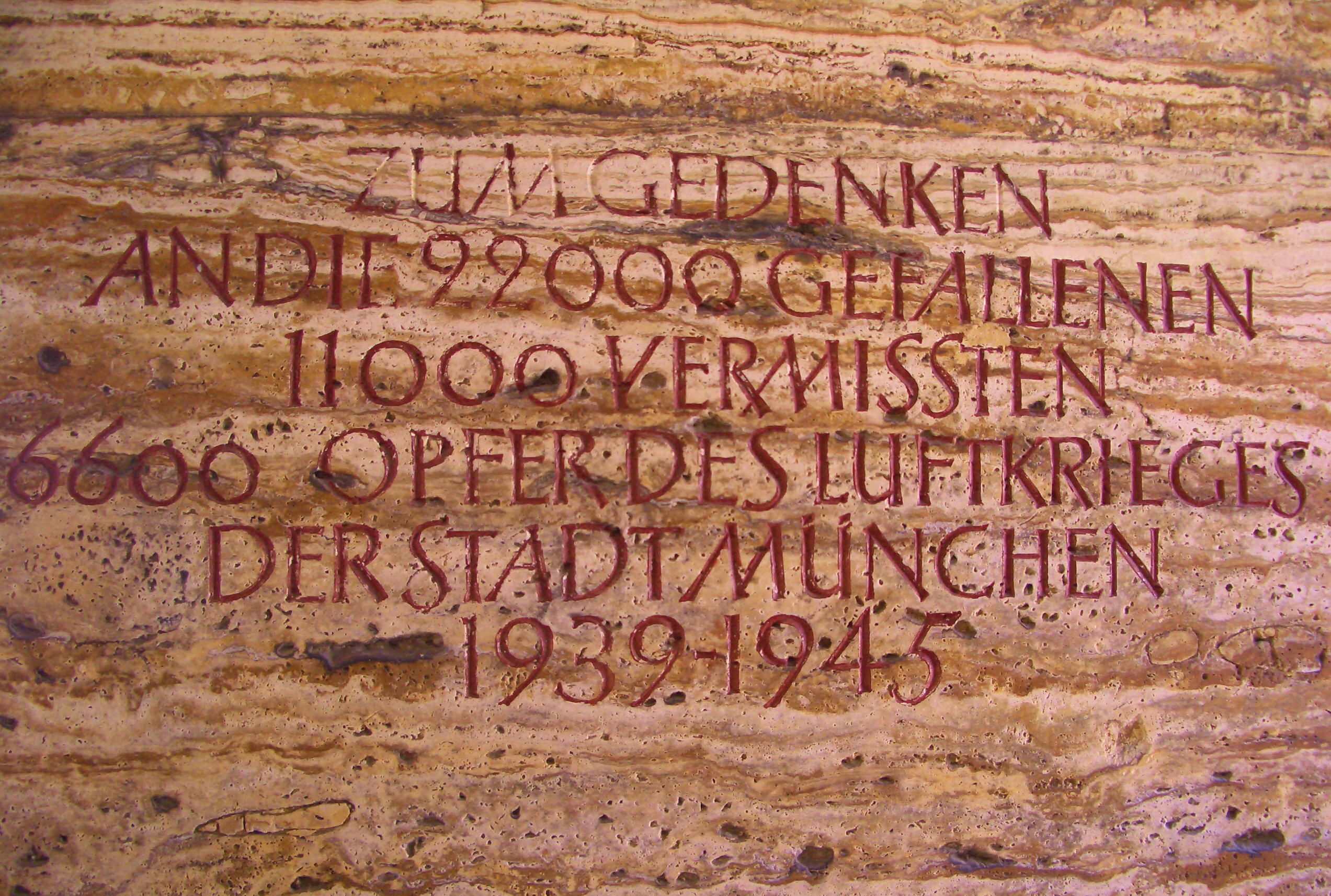
Inscription inside the crypt

- On the eastern side "Unseren Gefallenen" ("For our dead").
- The western side of the exterior displays the sentence "Sie werden auferstehen" ("They will rise").
- The interior features the inscription "Erbaut / vom Obmannsbezirk / München-Stadt / des Bayr. Kriegerbundes / den / 13.000 / gefallenen Heldensöhnen / der Stadt München / 1914-1918" ("Built / by the umpire district / Munich city / of the Bavarian Warrior League / for the / 13,000 / fallen heroic sons / of the city of Munich / 1914-1918").
- On the pedestal of the statue "Bayerns Heer / seinen Toten" ("For Bavaria's army / and its dead") can be read.

Originally, the names of the KIA from Munich were engraved into the walls. Due to the damage from World War II, the memorial was rebuilt without the names, as the old inscription was destroyed and the list of names that was originally used became lost. But instead the sentence "Zum Gedenken / an die 22.000 Gefallenen / 11.000 Vermissten / 6.600 Opfer des Luftkrieges / der Stadt München / 1939-1945" ("For the commemoration / of the 22,000 killed in action / 11,000 missing in action / 6,600 casualties of the aerial warfare / in the city of Munich / 1939-1945") was added on the inside.
