= Hubert Gerhard =

Dutch sculptor

Hubert Gerhard (c. 1540/1550–1620; born 's-Hertogenbosch) was a Dutch sculptor. Like many of his contemporaries, he may have left the Netherlands to escape the religious conflicts and iconoclasm of the 1566–1567 era. He trained in Florence in the circle of Giambologna, who heavily influenced his style. Gerhard's dominant subject-matter, characteristic of many Northern Mannerist artists, was the mythological gods of antiquity.

Gerhard's early patrons, the Fugger banking family of Augsburg, returned to patronage of the arts around 1580. Their castle at Kirchheim included works by him including a mantelpiece, bronze ornaments for the fountain of Mars and Venus, and a dense bronze on a base bordered by fantastic terms (1590). Gerhard also added bronze sculptures to the Augustus fountain by Adriaen de Vries erected to commemorate the 1600th anniversary of the establishment of Augsburg by Emperor Augustus. The four rivers of the city are represented by the statues of four river gods around the basin of the fountain. These bronze figures are reminiscent of the work of Giambologna. When the Florentine-based artist Friedrich Sustris became the artistic superintendent for Wilhelm V, Duke of Bavaria (1548–1626; r. 1579–97), he lured Gerhard to Munich, where the sculptor resided from 1584 to 1597. Gerhard prepared the monumental bronze of St. Michael Vanquishing Lucifer that adorns the façade of St. Michael's Church, Munich. With Carlo's help, he also made about fifty over-life-size terracotta statues of saints and angels that line the interior of the Jesuit church.

With the financial crisis of 1597, which forced Wilhelm V to abdicate, Gerhard and most of the court's artists were suddenly unemployed. Between 1599 and 1613, Gerhard served Archduke Maximilian III of Austria, first in Bad Mergentheim and then in Innsbruck. Maximilian III commissioned small-scale bronzes, including equestrian portraits and mythological statuettes, in addition to his tomb and other large projects. The pathos that characterizes Gerhard's Munich works becomes less pronounced when in Innsbruck.

When two bronze statues by Gerhard arrived in Prague in 1602 Holy Roman Emperor Rudolph II critically said of them: "the workmanship is subtle and pure, but the positioning of the figures is rather poor. Master Adriaen, as his Imperial Majesty's sculptor is far more accomplished in this." Rudolf's remark highlights the rivalry which existed between two art-loving connoisseurs, as Gerhard at the time of was employed by Rudolf's younger brother, Archduke Maximilian III of Austria.

In 1613, Gerhard returned to Munich, where he worked until his death seven years later.

Gerhard's works includes sculptures in bronze of Perseus and Medusa, Venus and Mars with Cupid, Mercury, an allegory of Bavaria, Tarquinius attacking Lucretia, St. Michael slaying the Devil, the sea-god Neptune, and in terracotta, a quartet of personifications of the seasons. Important works are located in Augsburg and Munich.
