= Adolph von Asch zu Asch auf Oberndorff =

German politician

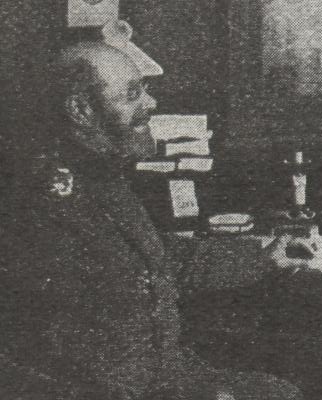
- Asch (1904 photo)
- Born: 30 October 1839; Munich, Kingdom of Bavaria
- Died: 18 February 1906 (aged 66); Munich, Bavaria, German Empire
- Occupation: Soldier
- Military career
- Service: Bavarian Army
- Years: 1859–1905
- Rank: General of the infantry
- Commands: 1st Royal Bavarian Div.; 2nd Royal Bavarian Div.
- Conflicts: Austro-Prussian War; Franco-Prussian War

Adolf Freiherr von Asch zu Asch auf Oberndorff was a Bavarian military officer.

Born in Munich on 30 October 1839, Asch joined the Bavarian Army as an unterleutnant in 1859. In 1866, during the Austro-Prussian War, Asch was an oberleutnant; during the Franco-Prussian War, he was adjutant to General Ludwig Freiherr von und zu der Tann-Rathsamhausen. From 1874 to 1885, Asch served in the Bavarian General Staff before commanding the 1st Royal Bavarian Division as an oberst. In 1889 he was promoted to generalmajor, and four years later took command of the 2nd Royal Bavarian Division. From 5 June 1893 through 4 April 1905, Asch was the Bavarian Minister of War and oversaw:

expansion of the Bavarian Army: organization and practical training of the Bavarian Army; establishment of the III Army Corps based in Nuremberg (1900), organization of the field artillery; establishment of the first Bavarian machine gun department; formation of the first detachments hunter on horseback

Asch retired from the military in 1905 at the rank of general of the infantry. He died in Munich on 18 February 1906.
