= Euphonicon =

Piano

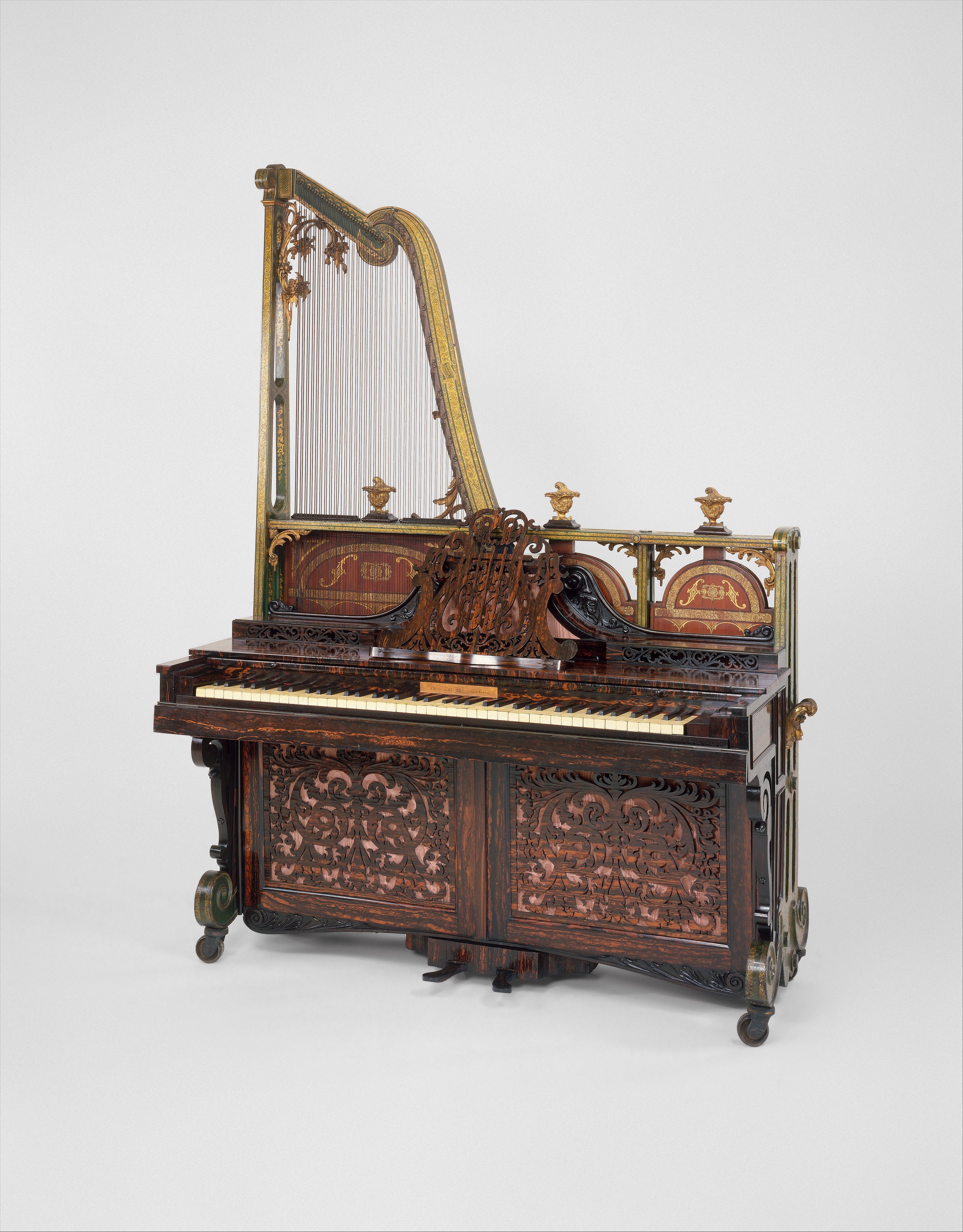
Euphonicon (1843) by F. Beale & Co. (from MET 44.58)

A euphonicon is a variety of upright piano.

The distinguishing feature of the euphonicon is that the iron harp frame projects from the body on the left, such that the bass strings are open to view. It also has unusual stringing and tuning arrangements, and an early example of drop-action. Rather than a single soundboard, it has three soundbases which imitate the appearance of the cello (behind the bass strings), viola (behind the tenor strings) and violin (behind the treble strings).

Although the euphonicon resembles a harp piano (claviharp) in appearance, the action strikes strings with hammers rather than plucking them.

The euphonicon was invented by John Steward, Wolverhampton, in 1841 (patent no. 9023, granted in 1841) and manufactured by Frederick Beale and Company. It was never popular, but a number of examples exist in good condition in museum collections.

An instrument advertised in Sydney as "Beal's [sic] Royal Patent Grand Pianoforte Euphonicon" with a compass of seven octaves, C to C, was described as

"the instrument which attracted the universal attention of the musical world at the Great Exhibition . . . (having) the full length string of the horizontal grand without occupying more space than a semi-cottage . . . the richest quality of tone and elasticity of touch, (and) scarcely ever going out of tune, the atmosphere having no effect upon it."

== See also ==
- Giraffe piano
