= Christian Ernst Friederici =

German keyboard instrument builder

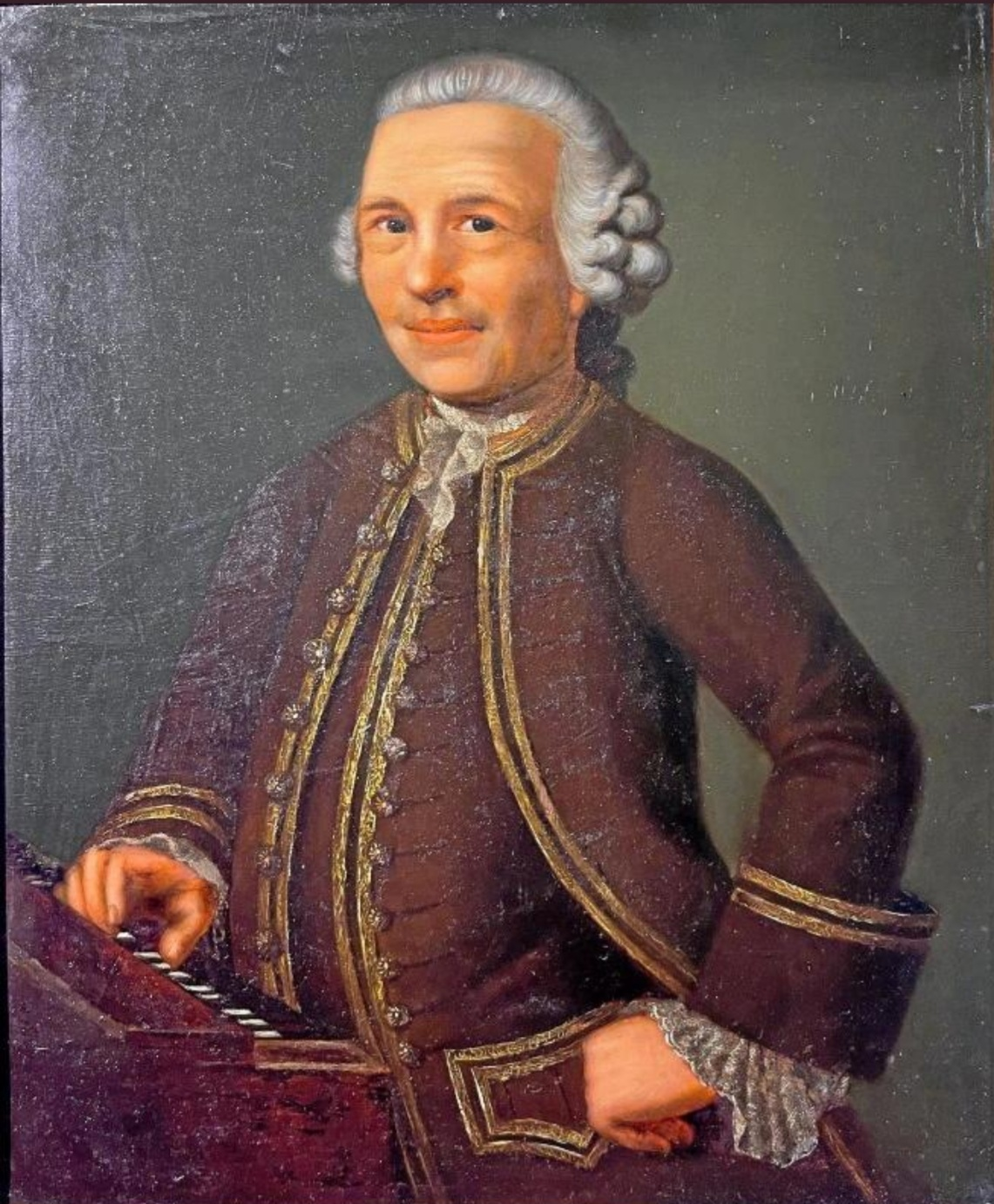
- Anonymous portrait of Friederici
- Born: 7 March 1709; Meerane
- Died: 4 May 1780 (aged 71); Gera
- Occupation: Keyboard instrument builder

Christian Ernst Friederici (7 March 1709 – 4 May 1780) was a German builder of keyboard instruments. He is most known as a manufacturer of stringed keyboard instruments such as the Pyramidenflügel (pyramid piano) and the fortbien. He apprenticed under Gottfried Silbermann and Tobias Heinrich Gottfried Trost and from 1737, worked in Gera with his brother until his death. His instruments were owned by C.P.E. Bach and the Mozart family.

== Biography ==
Christian Ernst Friederici was born on 7 March 1709 in Meerane to Johann Friederici (1653–1731), vice-mayor of the city and an organ builder. He was apprenticed in organ building to Gottfried Silbermann from 1730. In 1734, Silbermann recommended him and Jacob Graichen, another pupil of Silbermann, to Tobias Heinrich Gottfried Trost, who was looking for journeymen who could help him build an organ in Altenburg. After his employment under Trost ended in 1737, he left for Gera, where there was a demand for an organ builder. His brother, Christian Gottfried Friederici (1714–1777), joined him in 1744.

In 1761 he invented the Clavecinbebung, a harpsichord with a Bebung mechanism, which allowed it to play vibratos. Around this time, he was conferred with the title of court organ builder in Gotha and Altenburg. After a legal dispute over of his organ in the Church of St. Jakobi in Chemnitz, he was dismissed from his post.

After his death in 1780, his nephew, Christian Gottlob, continued the keyboard manufacture business.

== Instruments ==
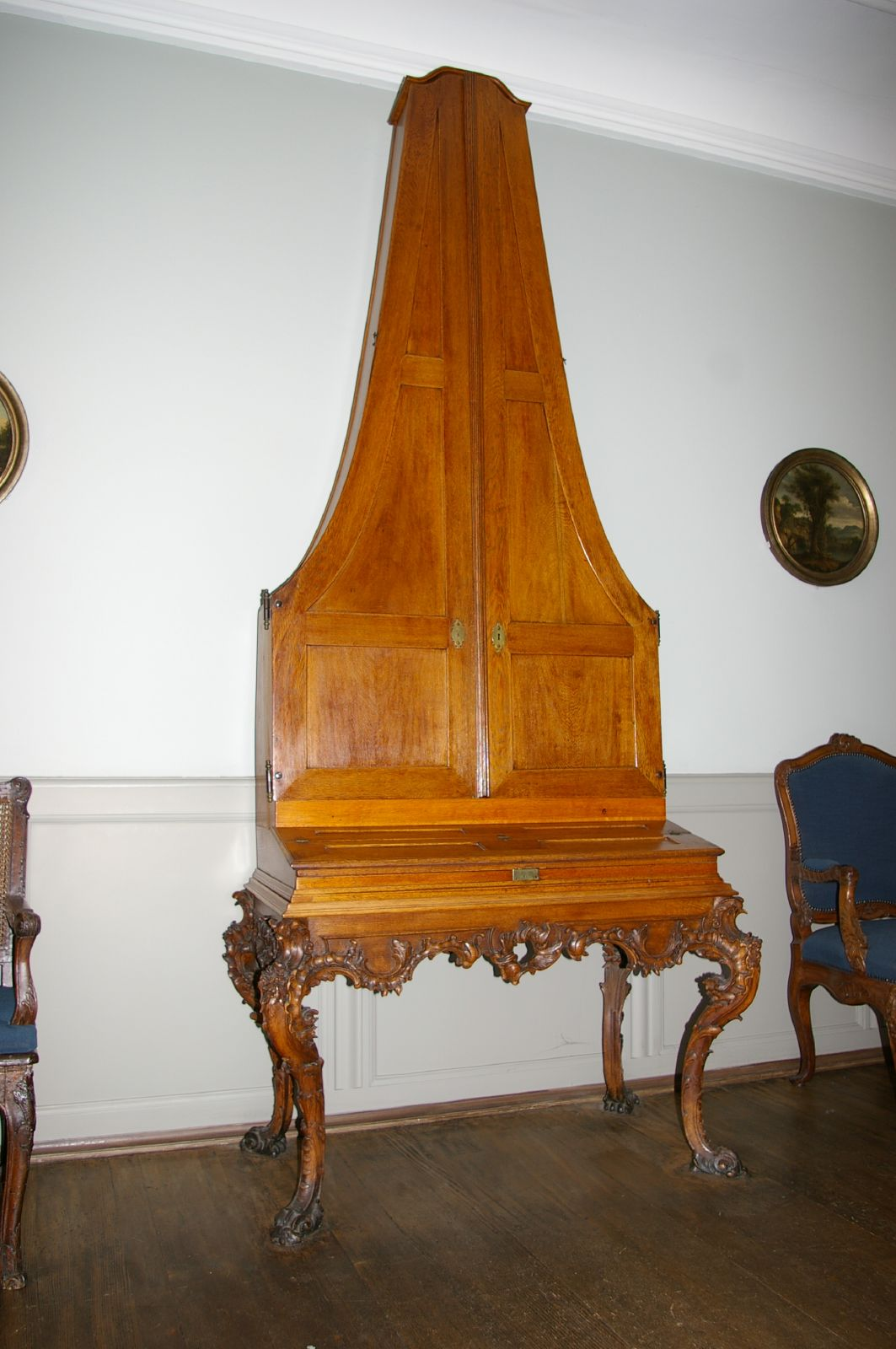
The Pyramidenflügel in the Goethe House

According to Ernst Ludwig Gerber, Friederici built 50 organs in his lifetime, of which the one in Chemnitz is considered to be the most excellent. His craftsmanship shows the influence of Trost and Silbermann, while the disposition of stops reflected the practices of the galant era.

In 1745 he invented the Pyramidenflügel (pyramid piano), an upright piano with a symmetrical body tapered at the end. He had an engraving of the instrument made in the same year. Its design is similar to the clavicytherium housed in the Kunsthistorisches Museum, Vienna. Of the three surviving pyramid pianos, Stewart Pollens concluded that only the one in the Goethe House is likely by Friederici owing to similarities with the 1745 engraving and with Silbermann's pianoforte; Michael Cole dismisses all three as inauthentic. It is not known whether the Friederici instrument purchased by Johann Caspar Goethe in 1769 was a pyramid piano or another instrument, such as a harpsichord or a fortepiano, but there is no evidence to suggest that the pyramid piano in the Goethe House belonged to Goethe's family. It was acquired from Paul de Wit's collection as late as 1902.

Friederici was also known for his combined harpsichord-piano, the fortbien. The name is either a French corruption of fortepiano, or a pun referring to hitting the instrument good and hard to get it to produce a sound. Daniel Gottlob Türk describes it as a square piano in 1789, and Joachim Hess reported that the instrument had eight stops in 1774. While authorities of the 19th century, such as Fétis and Alfred James Hipkins consider Friederici as the inventor of the square piano, following Heinrich Christoph Koch's claim that he invented it in around 1758, the year may have been mistakenly added by Koch after seeing Friederici's name appear in Jakob Adlung's Anleitung published that year. No specimen of the instrument survives.

Musicians from Friederici's time praised his instruments. C.P.E. Bach wrote to Johann Nikolaus Forkel that he preferred Friderici's clavichords over Hass' and Fritz's. Both makers' clavichords had strings an octave higher in the bass register of the instrument, which Bach disliked. Bach may have acted as Friederici's agent; Forkel wrote that Bach was selling fortbiens in 1773. The Mozart family owned two instruments by Friederici: a two-manual harpsichord and possibly a clavichord. Leopold later gave the clavichord to Nannerl, while the harpsichord was sold after his death. In a letter to his son, Leopold warned that he should avoid talking about Friederici's instruments to the piano builder Johann Andreas Stein, because of Stein's jealousy towards Friederici.
