= Maria im Weingarten =

- Wallfahrtskirche Maria im Weingarten
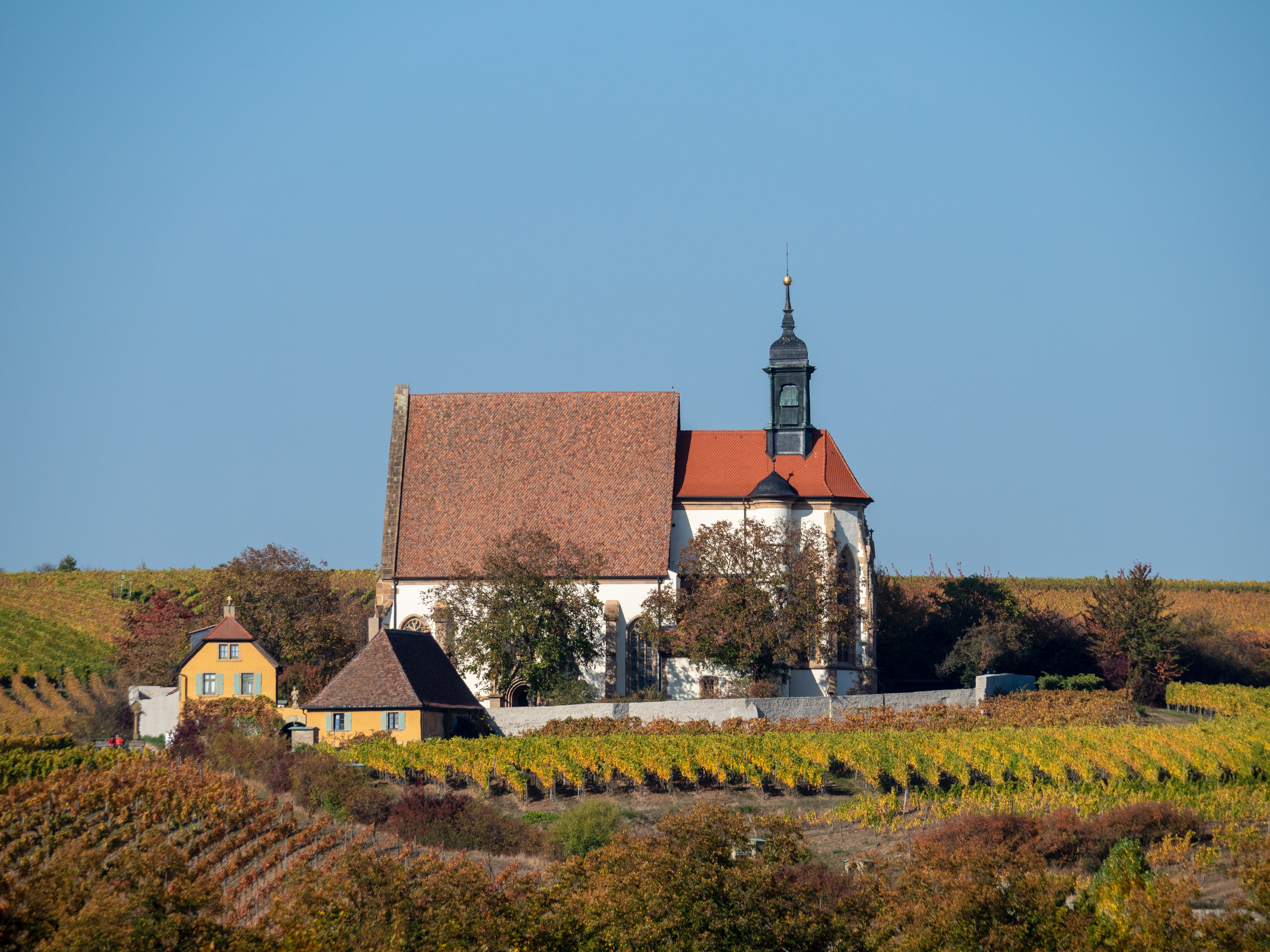
- The pilgrimage church in the vineyards (View from the south, October 2018)
- Maria im Weingarten
- 49.874628°N 10.214077°E
- Location: Volkach, Bavaria, Germany
- Country: Germany
- Denomination: Roman Catholic

History
- Dedication: Virgin Mary

Architecture
- Architectural type: Pilgrimage church
- Style: Late Gothic
- Completed: 15th century

The Maria im Weingarten (Mary in the Vineyard) is a Catholic pilgrimage church situated above the Franconian wine town of Volkach on the Mainschleife in the district of Kitzingen, Lower Franconia. The Late Gothic church is located in the midst of the vineyards of the Franconian wine region on the Volkach Kirchberg (Church Hill). It houses a significant work of art by the woodcarver Tilman Riemenschneider.

== History ==
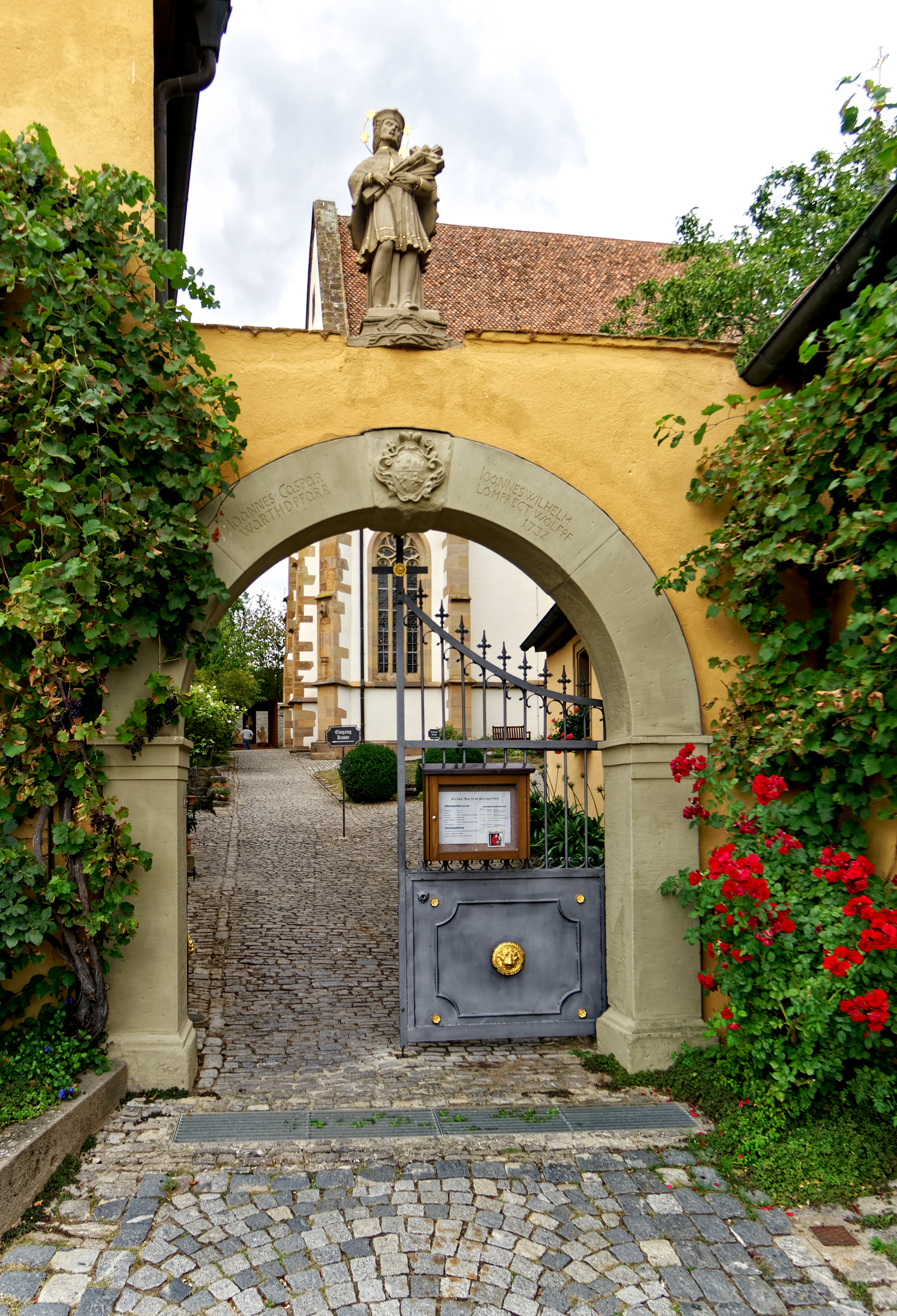
Entrance to the churchyard (September 2019)

As the oldest parish in the Mainschleife region, the pilgrimage church of Maria im Weingarten has a rich history. Threatened by wars and destruction over the centuries, it became particularly well known due to a spectacular art theft in the 1960s.

=== Proto-parish and Beguine Hermitage (to the 15th Century) ===
The origins are unknown, but it is assumed that the church on the hill served as the original parish church for the settlements on the Mainschleife in the 10th and 11th centuries. This is supported by findings of a Carolingian-Ottonian church beneath the current structure. The villages of Volkach, Obervolkach, Eichfeld, Astheim, Gaibach, Krautheim, as well as Stammheim and Fahr belonged to the Kirchberg parish. A different church stood on the site of the current one at that time; it was dedicated to Saint Bartholomew and was first mentioned in 1245 as the church "de monte kyrhberc prope volka" (Lat. from the mountain Kirchberg near Volkach).

The 14th century brought a decisive change when a Beguine hermitage was established on the hill near the town. The lay religious women came from the dissolved Beguinage at St. John's Church in Großbirkach near Ebrach and reached Volkach in 1332. Until 1442, they cared for the sick and poor on the hill. During this time, the new church of St. Bartholomew and St. George was built in the town itself, which soon took over the parish duties of the Kirchberg. Concurrently, an image of the Pietà created around 1370 gave rise to a pilgrimage directed towards the Volkach Kirchberg.

=== New Construction and Pilgrimage Church (to the 19th Century) ===
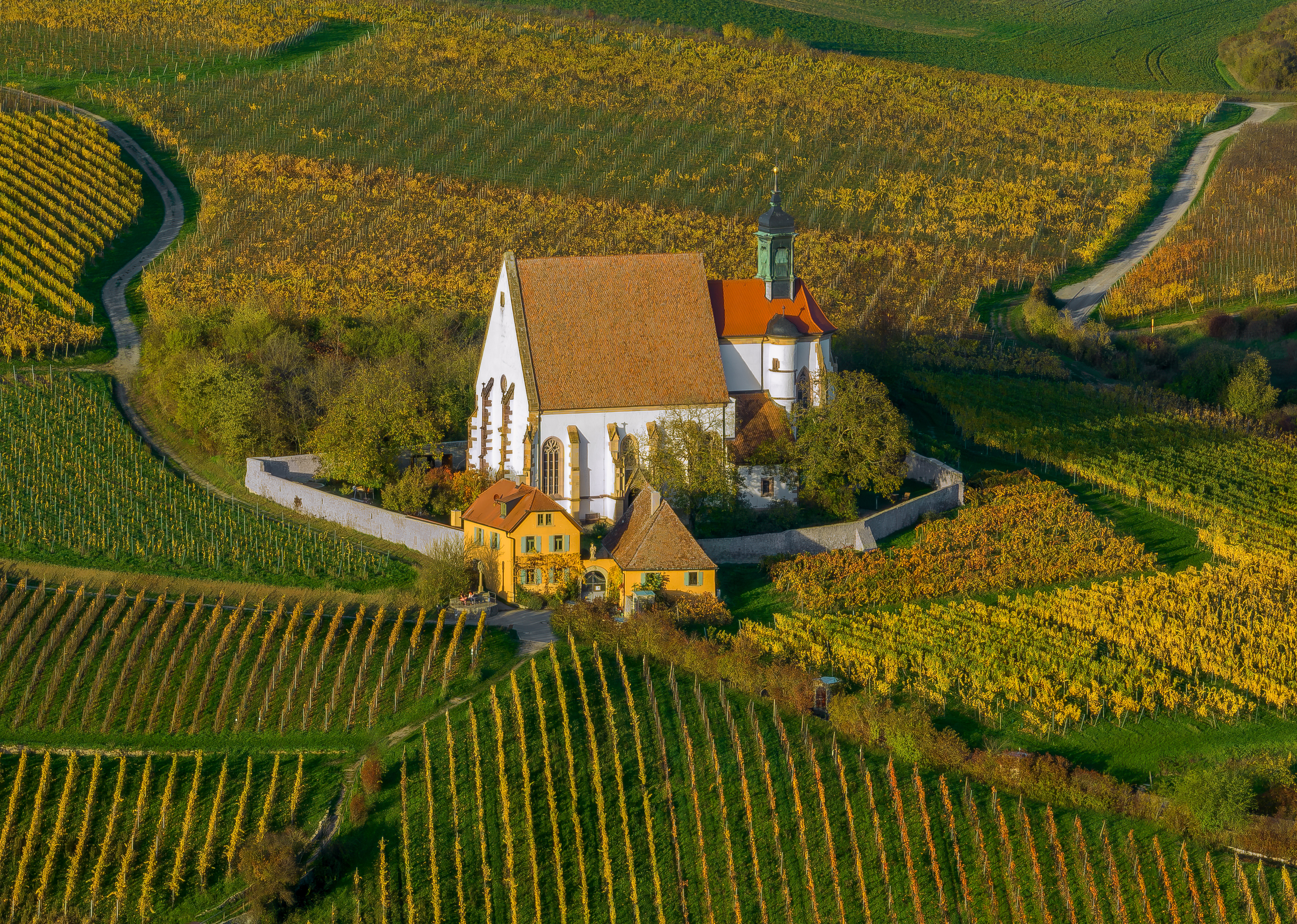
Maria im Weingarten (Aerial view from the southwest, October 2022)

The pilgrimage was supported by a Marian brotherhood founded around the Prince-Bishop of Würzburg Gottfried IV Schenk von Limpurg. In addition to the Bishop, it consisted of nobles such as the Counts of Castell, the Lords of Seinsheim, and the Zollner von Halberg family, as well as citizens of Volkach. In 1442, they dissolved the Beguine house and pushed for the prompt construction of a new church. In 1447, the building was dedicated to Saint Mary. The Würzburg builder Kilian Reuter was recruited for the task; he completed the choir c. 1450. The 1451 consecration was performed by the Auxiliary Bishop Wichman of Bersabee.

The construction of the nave followed until 1457, again executed by master Kilian Reuter. He planned the building as a three-aisled hall church. However, the installation of a flat ceiling and its painting in 1499 by Master Ulrich resulted in a single-aisled hall structure. With the turn of the 16th century, the pilgrimage church lost its importance to Maria im Sand in Dettelbach, and fewer pilgrims visited the church.

In 1521, those responsible attempted to attract more pilgrims with the Madonna of the Rosary by Tilman Riemenschneider; this failed initially. Prince-Bishop Julius Echter von Mespelbrunn had the church repainted in 1610 and visited the site. In 1628, there were plans to establish a monastery on the Kirchberg, but the outbreak of the Thirty Years' War ended these efforts. However, the horrors of the subsequent war years revived the pilgrimage to the Kirchberg.

After the war, six monks again cared for the pilgrims, coming from the Franciscans, the Penitents, and the Capuchins. The Baroque redesign of the pilgrimage church began in 1664. These renovations concluded in 1724 with the Baroque altar, purchased for 120 fl. from the Abbey Church of Münsterschwarzach. In 1880, the church was altered when Neo-Gothic fittings were added to the interior. These were removed during a renovation in 1954/1955.

=== The "Madonna Robbery" and Art Pilgrimage (to Present) ===
On the night of August 6–7, 1962, thieves stole the Madonna of the Rosary and two other valuable pieces of the church's furnishings. In the process, they damaged the Madonna. A plea for help from Volkach notables was answered by Henri Nannen, editor-in-chief of the magazine Stern. He offered a ransom of 100,000 DM and promised the thieves that the police would not be involved. This promise brought him mixed reactions in the press; Die Zeit asked, "Does reverence for art sanctify a word of honor to crooks?", while the artist Oskar Kokoschka supported the action. Henri Nannen himself saw both the charitable aspect and the PR success for his publishing house.

The appeal in Stern on August 21, 1962 ("Give the Madonna back to the people of Volkach") was not answered by the thieves until two months later. In late October, a tip was received regarding the location of part of the loot; in return, the first half of the ransom was deposited. In early November, a tip followed regarding the location of the most valuable pieces, including the Madonna, near a country road by Großgründlach, and the second half of the ransom was deposited. The artworks were restored and returned to Volkach in 1963. Police investigations were eventually successful, and the thieves were arrested in 1968.

The pilgrimage church underwent extensive exterior restoration in 1976/77. In 2002, Cathedral Chapter Jürgen Lenssen led a renovation of the church, restoring both the interior and the façade. The most recent renovation took place in 2010. The Bavarian State Office for Monument Preservation lists the church building as an architectural monument under the number D-6-75-174-73. The church is part of the Franconian Marienweg.

== Architecture ==
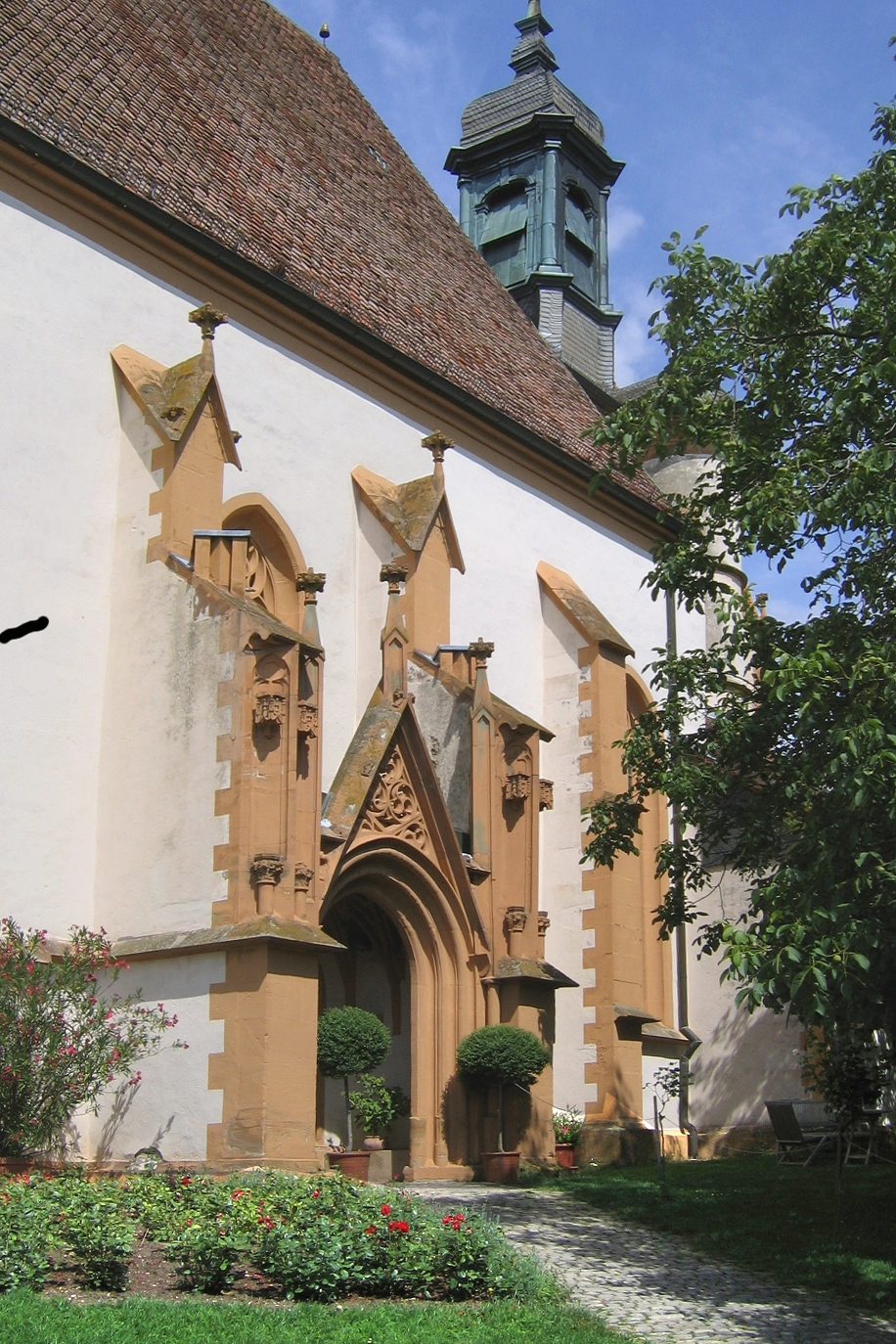
South Portal (August 2006)

The church is oriented towards the east and presents itself as a single-aisled hall church from the Late Gothic period. A high saddle roof towers over the nave, while the choir is capped by a much lower hipped roof. A Baroque ridge turret from 1750 is mounted on the roof of the choir.

=== Choir ===
The choir is articulated by six windows and seven buttresses. It has a five-eighths termination. The pillars display rich ornamentation. Figure consoles and canopies indicate a planned program of statues that was never implemented. The windows are bordered by lancet-like pointed arches and decorated with tracery. Each window is individually decorated, distinguishing circles, mouchette (fish-bladder) ornamentation, as well as trefoil and quatrefoil windows. The interior of the choir features net vaulting.

The oldest part of the pilgrimage church is a Romanesque square tower stump, planned in the 13th or 14th century but never completed. It is located to the south of the choir and serves today as the sacristy. To its east is a stair tower. It is round and crowned by a squat dome. The tower can be reached via a staircase on the outside of the choir.

=== Nave ===
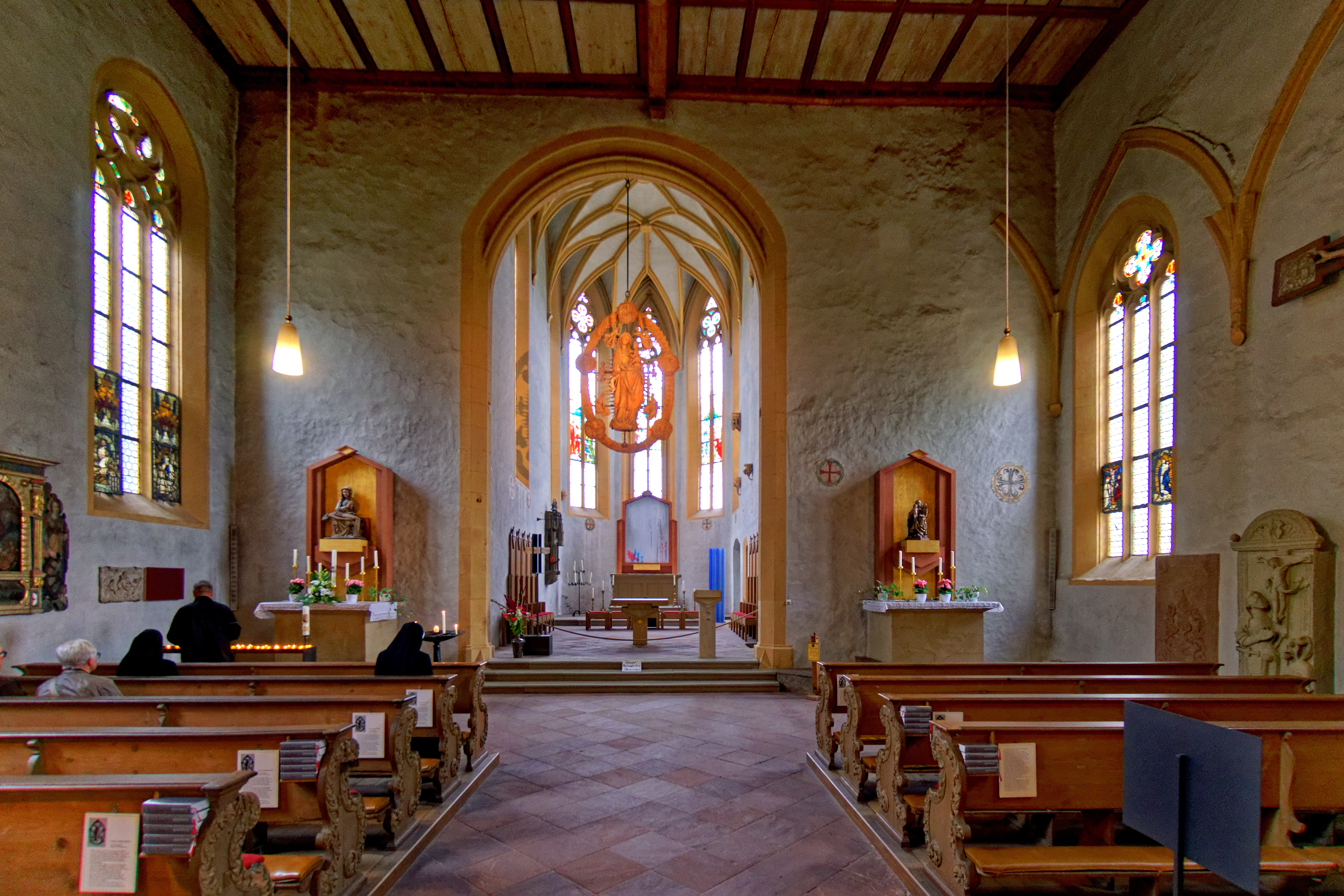
Nave and Choir (September 2019)

The nave is articulated by two windows on each side. Like the choir, buttresses were attached, with consoles and canopies pointing to an unexecuted ensemble of figures. The north side of the church is very plain. Here, one window is placed centrally, while the other is shifted far to the east. Four buttresses interrupt the side. Two others project transversely at the sides.

In the west of the complex is one of the two portals. It is centrally located and framed only by two buttresses. The entrance is crowned by pinnacles and originally featured a statue showing Christ as the Savior of the World. The south portal is the main entrance of the church, indicated by a porch and a gable crowned by a finial. A small window with tracery surmounts the portal, which lies centrally in the south of the complex.

The doors are decorated with Late Gothic ironwork featuring lime leaf ornamentation and have door knockers. The eight horseshoes embedded in the south portal point to the tradition of the horse ride, during which the diseases of ungulates were supposed to be cured.

== Fittings ==
The medieval furnishings have largely been preserved in the pilgrimage church. These include, in particular, the famous sculptures of the Pietà and the Rosary Madonna by Tilman Riemenschneider. Epitaphs and tomb monuments testify that the house of God was also a burial place.

=== Pietà ===
The figure group of the Pietà, the Sorrowful Mother of God, was the primary destination of pilgrims in the past. The wooden sculpture stands above the left side altar. The miraculous image was created around 1370 and can be assigned to the Late Gothic period; a frame around the figure is of more recent date. In 1955, the group was restored, and the original coloring—specifically the blue dress and white mantle—was reinstated. This was the original goal of pilgrimage.

It depicts the suffering Mother Mary holding her dead son in her lap. The stigmata of Christ are also visible. The realistic depiction of the death of Jesus is contrasted with the youthful Mary. Her representation belongs to the type of the so-called "Beautiful Vesper Image" (Schönes Vesperbild). She raises her hands, folded in prayer, to her chest; the rich drapery of her dress spills out from under the deceased.

=== Anna Selbdritt ===
Above the right side altar stands an "Anna Selbdritt" group (Saint Anne with the Virgin and Child). It is also surrounded by a newer enclosure. The wooden sculpture was created around 1500 and was modeled after a stone original from the workshop of Tilman Riemenschneider, which is now in the Mainfränkisches Museum in Würzburg. After the theft of the work in 1962, the figure group underwent comprehensive renovation.

The seated Saint Anne is depicted wearing a late medieval garment and a bonnet. Figures of Mary and the Christ Child accompany her. Mary sits on Saint Anne's left knee, while the naked boy Jesus stands on her right knee. Although Mary is depicted as a young woman with a long dress, she is reduced to the size of a child. In her hands, she holds an open book.

=== Riemenschneider Madonna ===
The church's most significant treasure is the suspended Madonna of the Rosary (also "Riemenschneider Madonna" or "Rosary Madonna") by Tilman Riemenschneider, created between 1521 and 1524.

==== History ====
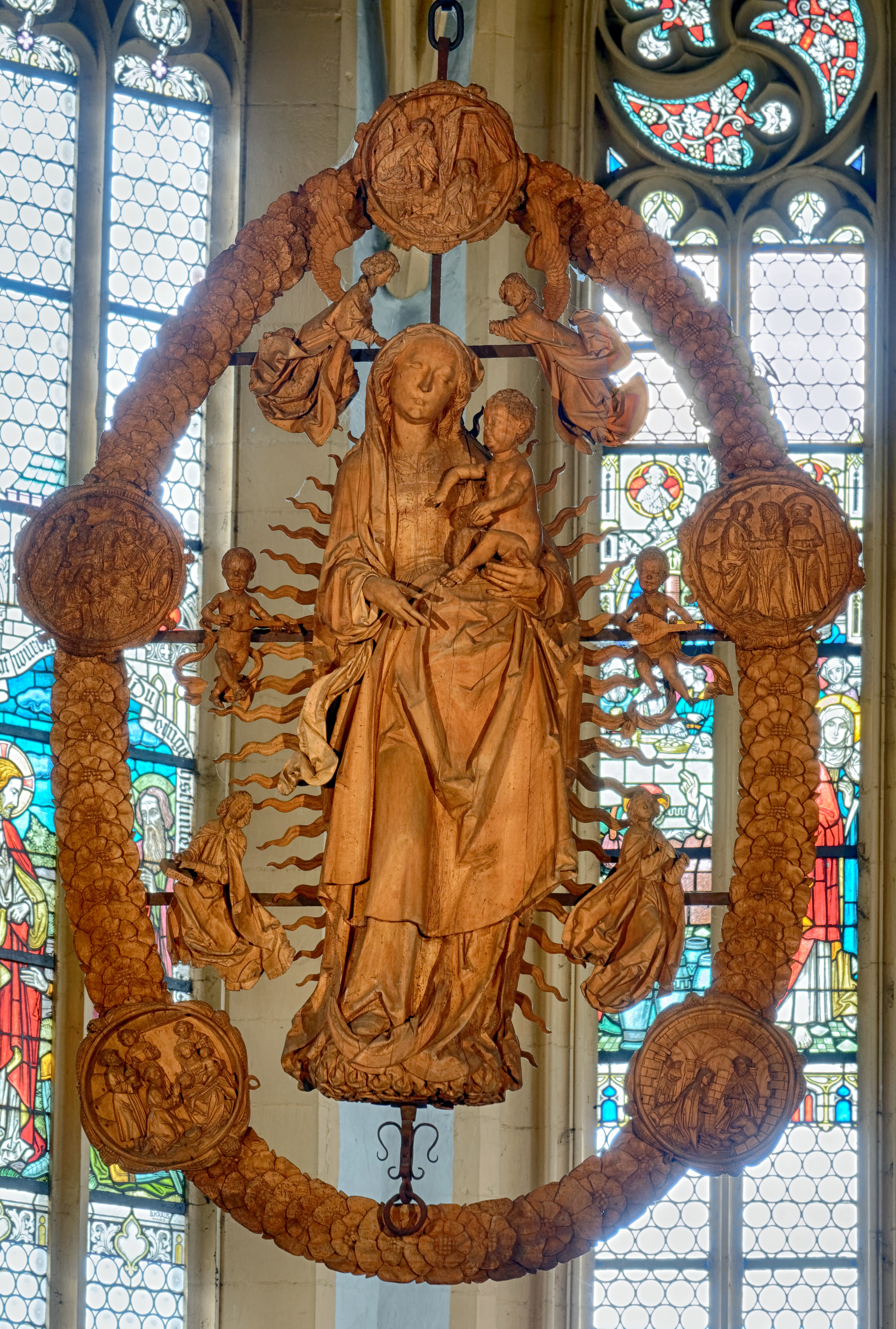
Riemenschneider Madonna

The limewood carving hanging below the chancel arch was Riemenschneider's last Marian image before he was prevented from further work by the German Peasants' War and his own involvement in it. The image quickly became the second goal of pilgrims in the church and was also the occasion for the founding of a Rosary Brotherhood in 1642.

The figure underwent several changes over time. During the Baroque period, the figure was painted, as evidenced by a copperplate engraving from 1849. In 1874, this overpainting was renewed, and a crown was later added. A colored replica of the Rosary Madonna is located in the church of St. Martin in Hillesheim (Eifel).

Only with a comprehensive restoration in 1954 did the Rosary Madonna regain its original, simple wooden version. In addition to the coloring, the location where the figure was mounted also changed over time. After initially hanging freely in the choir, it was moved to the north wall of the nave in the 19th century, before being hung above one of the side altars in 1954. After the robbery in 1962, the Madonna was returned to its original location above the choir.

The drapery is simpler than in other works by Riemenschneider. Art historians therefore assume that some parts were executed by journeymen of the workshop. Only the delicate right hand can be clearly attributed to the author. The model for the Volkach work is an earlier Madonna by Riemenschneider, now in the Dumbarton Oaks Collection in Washington, D.C. For individual scenes, Riemenschneider drew inspiration from works by Martin Schongauer and the Master E. S.. A particular model was the Angelic Salutation by Veit Stoss in the Church of St. Lorenz in Nuremberg, executed a few years earlier.

==== Description ====
The center of the figure is the approximately 1.80 m tall Madonna with the Child in her arms. She stands on a cloud console and has a crescent moon at her feet. Three pairs of angels fly around the Mother of God. She is surrounded by a flaming glory. Another wreath, representing stylized roses, surrounds the figure. Five medallions interrupt it, dividing it into ten blossoms each. On the back, the reliefs show the five Stigmata of Christ, while the figure itself was carved over with cloud-like curls.

Mary carries the naked Jesus with her left hand. She does not look at him but tilts her head only slightly in his direction. Her mantle is closed below the hip. Her right hand presses it lightly against her hip. The drapery of her garment consists of large folds; her right leg steps slightly forward from it. Her hair is covered by a veil. The Child is shown in profile. He grasps the mother's breast with his right hand; the left holds a pear.

The reliefs contemplate the stations of Mary's life. At the top, the "Annunciation" is visible. A large prayer desk and the mighty canopy point to the scene on the Creglingen Altar. Moving clockwise, the "Visitation" follows. Mary and the pregnant Elizabeth join hands; Zacharias enters on the right. At the bottom appears the "Nativity", designed like a print by Schongauer. A rib vault surrounds the scene, while on the right the ox and donkey stand in the stable and on the left the entering shepherds are recognizable.

Another relief shows the "Adoration of the Magi". On the right is the Holy Family; Mary, with the Child on her lap, sits and is towered over by the standing Joseph. The Kings, on the left, prepare the gifts. Here too, models by Schongauer are cited. The "Death of Mary" forms the conclusion of the reliefs. The apostles crowd closely around the bed of the dying woman. One of them, probably John, hands Mary a candle. All reliefs are surrounded by rich fruit and animal ornamentation.

=== Epitaphs ===
There are two types of memorial plaques in the church: those carved in stone and those carved in wood. These two types were also spatially separated. While the wooden epitaphs hang on the north wall of the church, the stone slabs fill the south wall. All were created in honor of highly respected citizens of Volkach or the Zollners of the neighboring Hallburg.

==== Stone Epitaphs ====
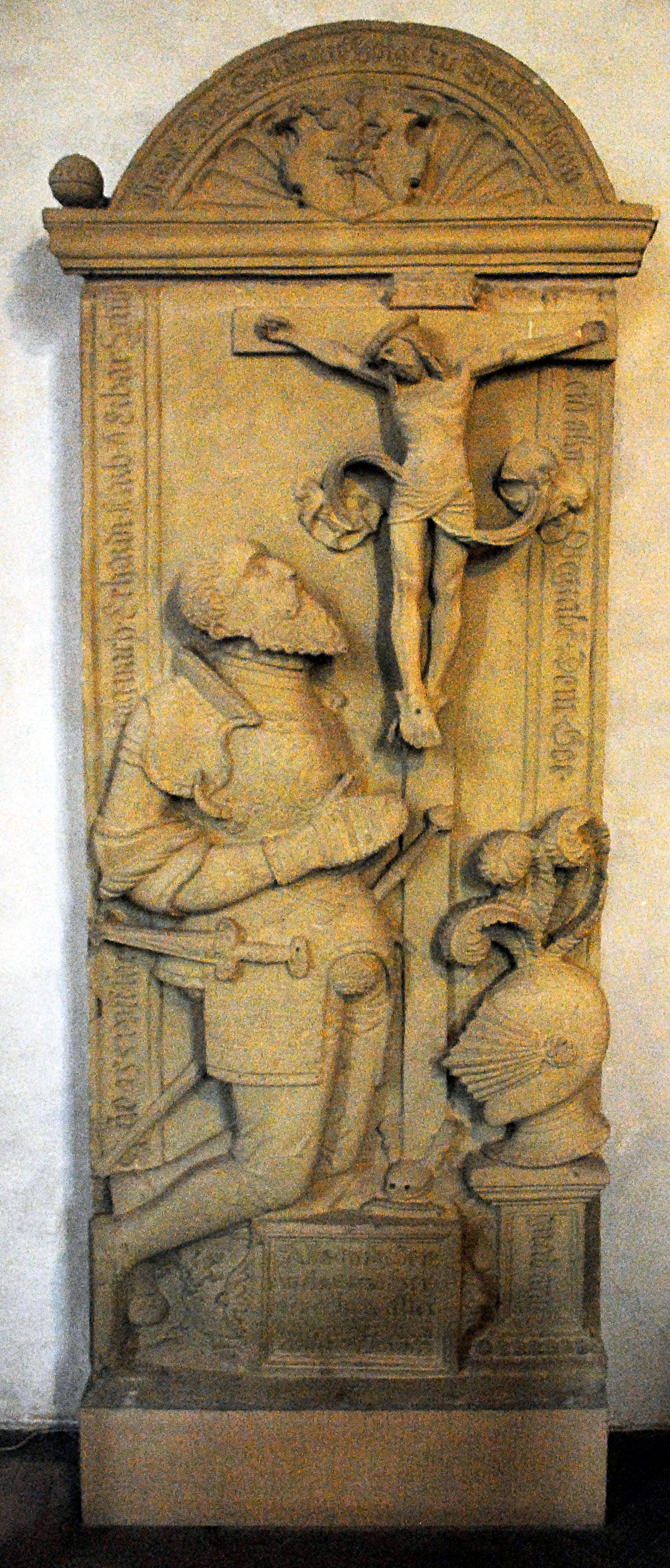
Epitaph of Jörg Spilmann from 1551

The oldest stone epitaph in the hill church dates from 1505. It belongs to Hans Zollner von Halberg, whose coat of arms is depicted on the stone. The memorial stone for Kaspar von Schaumberg (d. 1536), a Volkach Amtmann, and his wife Margareta (née von Wallenfels, d. 1540) shows the two deceased. While Kaspar kneels in full armor before the crucifix, his wife is styled in the women's costume of the 16th century. A baluster frame limits the slab. A stonemason's mark identifies the master as H.R.

To the right of the others rises the memorial slab of Jörg Spilmann. He had been appointed Vogt in Prosselsheim and died in 1551. He too kneels in armor before the Crucified One. The details suggest Peter Dell the Younger as the author of the work. The youngest stone slab also follows on the right side. It shows Hans Paulus Zollner von Halberg (d. 1620). He is shown standing on his memorial slab. His helmet visor is open. A sword hangs at his left side; a lion lies beneath him.

==== Wooden Epitaphs ====
The wooden epitaphs on the north wall also date from the late 16th and early 17th centuries. The most artistic was created by Master Heinrich Bruckner and is dedicated to Georg Sigmund Zollner von Halberg. He and his seven children are immortalized in the center of the panel. They pray with the nobleman's two wives. A red cross above the worshipers indicates who is already deceased.

Next to Georg Sigmund, one sees Maria, his first wife (née von Brandenstein), and Ursula, his second, under an image of the Resurrection of Jesus. The two figures on the sides symbolize Faith and Hope with their attributes. They rest on consoles supported by cornices. Two lion heads frame the worshipers below. A detailed inscription concludes the wooden panel at the bottom.

The wooden epitaph for Katharina Stich (d. 1619) closely follows that of Georg Sigmund in its form. In a central image, the Coronation of Mary is depicted. God the Father with tiara and Christ hand Mary the crown. A dove, symbol of the Holy Spirit, hovers above them, while an angel concert is performed below. Again, the deceased pray below the image. Instead of statues, two silhouette-like cut-out wooden figures frame the epitaph. They show Saint Catherine and Saint Lawrence.

Another wooden epitaph is dedicated to Margaretha and Christoph Böhm. They died in the years 1652 and 1699. A Baroque architectural frame surrounds the memorial plaque. A central image depicts Mary as Queen of the Rosary. On the left side, she gives the rosary to Saint Dominic. On the right side, the Christ Child hands a belt to Saint Francis. An inscription mentions the donor of the plaque, Christoph Böhm's second wife Susanna.

=== Crucifixion Group ===
Opposite the south portal, on the north wall of the church, rises a Crucifixion group from the year 1555. It is 3.40 m high and its design already reveals the beginning of the Renaissance. A signature on the cross base ("T + K") points to the master Thomas Kistner from Würzburg. Originally, the work was located in front of the church, overlooking the cemetery. The accompanying figures of Mary and John come from an older figure group; they were created at the beginning of the 16th century.

Christ on the cross has a face distorted by pain. The figure corresponds to the "three-nail type". An inscription is attached to the cross. It reads: "hodie Mihi, Cras Tibi" (Lat. today me, tomorrow you). The base is decorated with naturalistic rocks. Figures of snakes, turtles, and lizards are attached to it. A skull lies at the feet of the Crucified One. Mary and John stand on consoles attached to the wall.

=== Stained Glass ===
Seven remnants of the original Gothic glass paintings have been installed in the windows of the church. They were created in the years 1470 to 1480. In 1929, the remaining paintings were supplemented. They show the Miracles of Jesus. All paintings are now located in the windows of the nave, with four of these glass paintings installed in the first window on the north side, two in the front window on the south side, and one in the rear window.

On the north side, the Mother of God with the Child in her arms is depicted on the right; a crown is carried by hovering angels above her head. To her left kneels a knight in plate armor, hands folded in prayer. It is likely Michael von Schwarzenberg, who died in 1499. A coat of arms of the Seinsheim von Schwarzenberg family is located below the worshiper. Gothic canopies frame the scenes. Below the figures, angels hold scrolls upwards.

The south side shows a Crucifixion group at the front. Mary and John stand under the cross; John looks up, Mary looks mourning to the ground. Furthermore, a Madonna with a halo is depicted on the glass paintings. Mary with the Child stands on a crescent moon. The glasses are kept in white and blue. In the rear area of the church, Saint Sebastian can be seen on the glass. The glass painting came into the church through a donation in 1955.

=== Organ ===
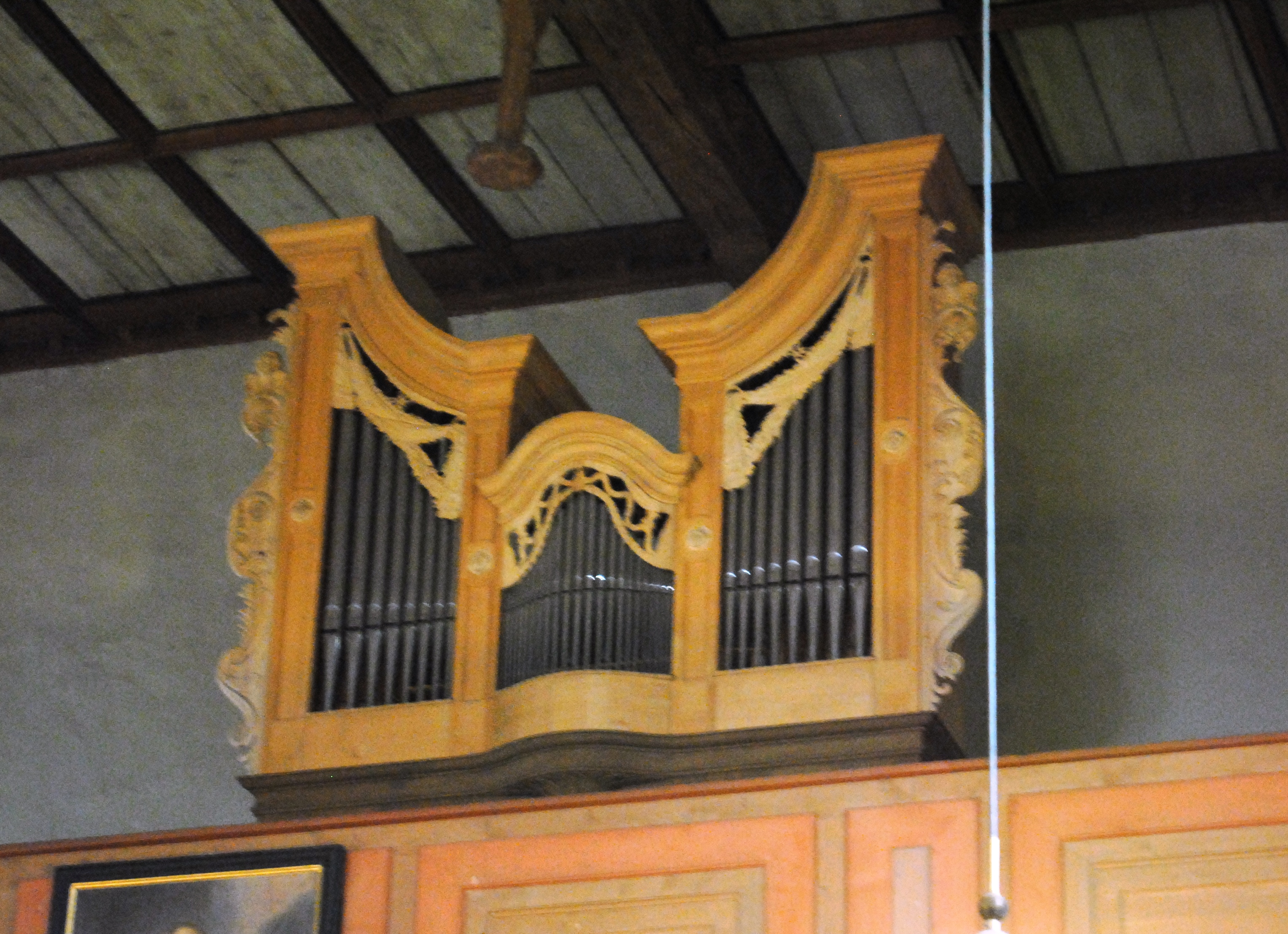
View of the organ (September 2013)

The pipe organ was created as part of the Baroque redesign of the church in 1794. The organ builder was Franz Martin Seuffert, who came from the famous family of organ and piano makers. In 1999 and 2000, the instrument was overhauled by Orgelbau Vleugels from Hardheim. The old facade (prospect) was reconstructed, and the Baroque timbre of the organ was restored. The slider chest instrument has 10 stops on one manual (CD-d3: Gedact 8', Salicional 8', Principal 4', Flauta Traver 4', Quint 3', Octav 2', Mixtur 1 1/2') and pedal (CD-d1: Subbaß 16', Octavbas 8', Posaunbas 8'). The key and stop actions are mechanical.

=== Other Fittings ===
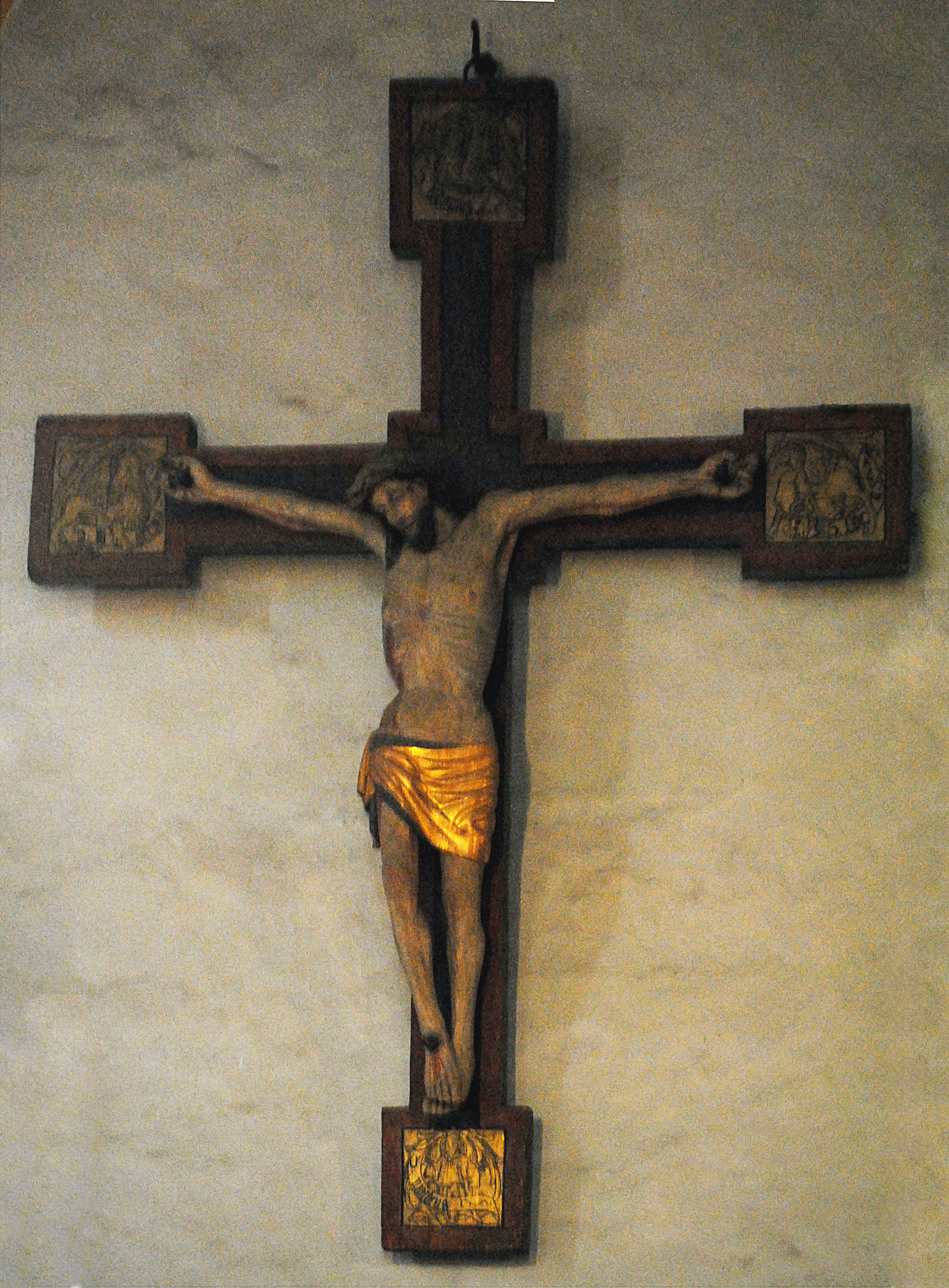
Crucifix in the Nave (September 2013)

In addition to the artworks mentioned above, there are other furnishings in the pilgrimage church.

==== Choir ====
The choir of the church underwent the greatest changes in 2002. Under the direction of Jürgen Lenssen, a simple celebration altar was created. In addition, an ambo and the choir stalls only came into the church through the renovation. An altarpiece on the east side of the choir shows the risen and transfigured Christ. The sacrament house on the north side of the choir, however, dates from the time the church was built. Pinnacles tower over the Gothic artwork. An angel holds an inscription on a scroll at the bottom. It reads: Ecce panis angelorum (Lat. "Behold the Bread of Angels").

==== Nave ====
The oldest artwork in the nave is the large crucifix on the right nave wall above the epitaphs. It was created in 1490 and originally hung in the chancel arch. The symbols of the four Evangelists are painted in gold at the ends of the cross arms. Jesus is depicted suffering. A few years later, the large fresco of Saint Christopher on the south side of the nave was created.

On the left side altar, one can recognize the so-called Throne of Mercy. It consists of alabaster and shows the Trinity; it dates from the 17th century. From the 18th century is a painting of Saint Lawrence on the gallery parapet. Two other pictures are located below the gallery; one shows the Sorrowful Mother of God Mary, the other depicts the vision of Francis. A statue from the 19th century shows Saint Lawrence. The pews, created around 1700, complete the church's furnishings.

== Surroundings ==
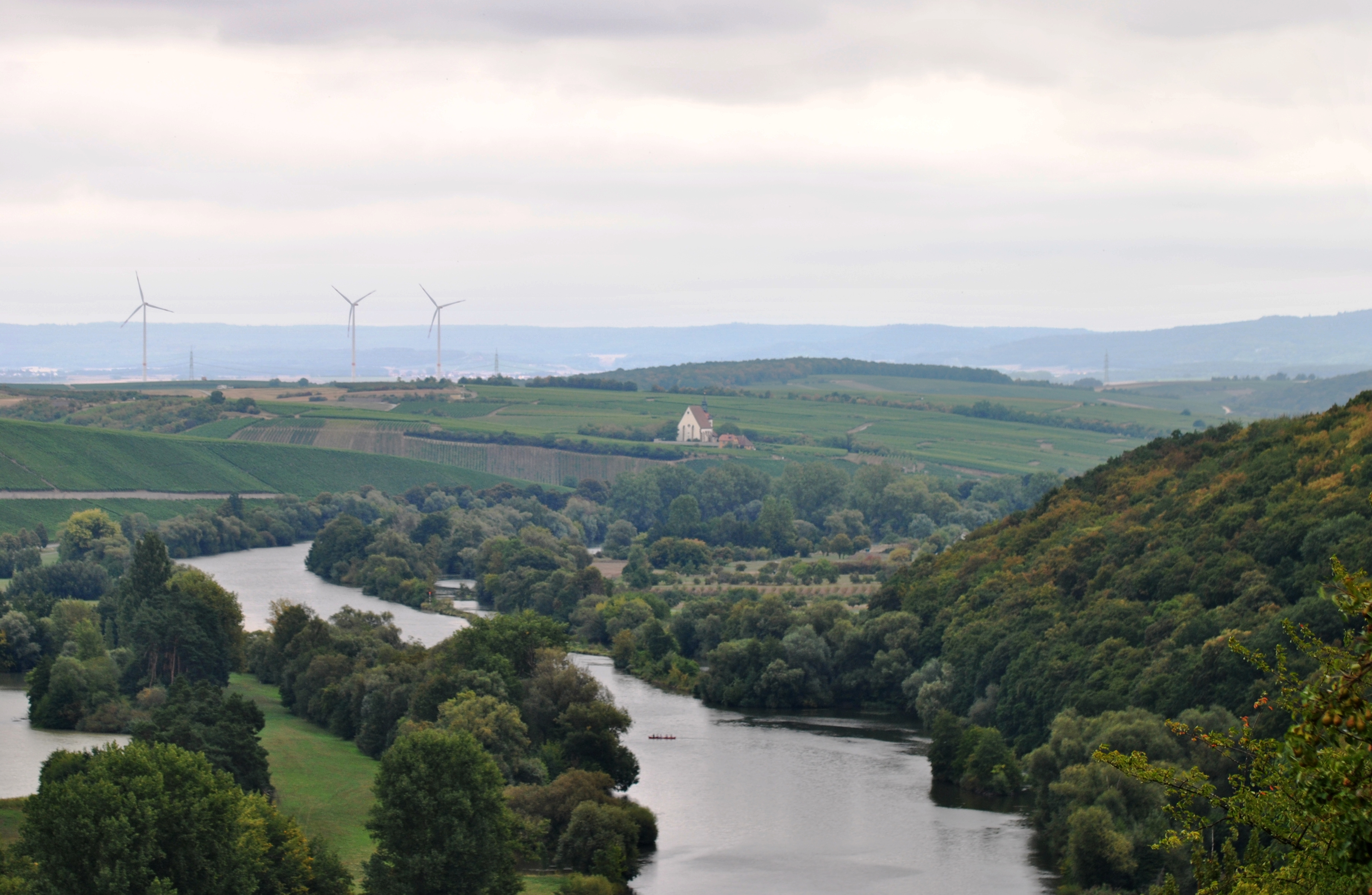
The church embedded in the landscape of the Mainschleife, seen from the west (September 2018)

The entire complex is protected by a wall that surrounds the former cemetery. Inside the fence are stone figure remnants of a 16th-century Mount of Olives group, which was formerly attached to the church building. The buildings to the west and south of the complex are from 1732. Access to the area behind the wall is through a round-arched gate topped with a Baroque statue of John of Nepomuk.

Formerly, a Stations of the Cross led from the town to the pilgrimage church; of this older way, three wayside shrines from 1521 are still preserved. Today, visitors reach the church from a parking lot below the hill on a shorter, younger Stations of the Cross with station images from the 19th century. A statue of the Mater Dolorosa interrupts the stations. The path leads through the middle of the vineyards (Weingarten) and merges into a wine, nature, and culture trail.

== Sources ==
- Bauer, Hans (1993). Landkreis Kitzingen. Ein Kunst- und Kulturführer [District of Kitzingen. An Art and Culture Guide] (in German). Marktbreit.
- "St. Maria im Weingarten" [St. Mary in the Vineyard]. Denkmalatlas Bayern (in German). Bayerisches Landesamt für Denkmalpflege. Aktennummer D-6-75-174-73.
- Bayerisches Landesamt für Denkmalpflege (2025-11-06). Baudenkmäler - Stadt Volkach [Architectural Monuments - City of Volkach] (PDF) (in German). Munich: Bayerisches Landesamt für Denkmalpflege.
- Breuer, Tilmann (1999). Franken: die Regierungsbezirke Oberfranken, Mittelfranken und Unterfranken [Franconia: the Administrative Districts of Upper Franconia, Middle Franconia and Lower Franconia] (in German). München. p. 1074. ISBN 3-422-03051-4.
- Dehio, Georg (1979). Handbuch der Deutschen Kunstdenkmäler. Bayern I: Franken [Handbook of German Art Monuments. Bavaria I: Franconia] (in German). München: Deutscher Kunstverlag. ISBN 3-422-00359-2.
- Dehio, Georg (1999). Breuer, Tilman (ed.). Handbuch der Deutschen Kunstdenkmäler. Bayern I: Franken [Handbook of German Art Monuments. Bavaria I: Franconia] (in German) (2nd ed.). München: Deutscher Kunstverlag. ISBN 978-3-422-03051-0.
- Egert, Gerhard (2004). Der Raub der Rosenkranz-Madonna von Tilman Riemenschneider aus der Wallfahrtskirche Maria im Weingarten auf dem Kirchberg bei Volkach 1962 [The Robbery of the Rosary Madonna by Tilman Riemenschneider from the Pilgrimage Church Mary in the Vineyard on the Kirchberg near Volkach 1962] (in German). Volkach.
- Egert, Gerhard (2006). "Die Immerkühe der Wallfahrtskirche St. Maria zu Volkach" [The "Immerkühe" (Perpetual Cows) of the Pilgrimage Church St. Mary at Volkach]. In Feuerbach, Ute (ed.). Volkach 906-2006 (in German). Volkach.
- Egert, Gerhard (2008). "Henri Nannen und der Volkacher Kunstraub 1962" [Henri Nannen and the Volkach Art Theft 1962]. In Feuerbach, Ute (ed.). Unsere Mainschleife. 1993–2007 [Our Mainschleife. 1993–2007] (in German). Volkach.
- Kirchenverwaltung Volkach (2004). Kirchberg Volkach. Maria im Weingarten [Kirchberg Volkach. Mary in the Vineyard] (in German). Volkach.
- Muth, Hanswernfried (1954). "Tilman Riemenschneiders Madonna im Rosenkranz in der Wallfahrtskirche „Maria auf dem Kirchberg" bei Volkach" [Tilman Riemenschneider's Madonna of the Rosary in the Pilgrimage Church "Mary on the Kirchberg" near Volkach]. Mainfränkisches Jahrbuch für Geschichte und Kunst 6 [Main-Franconian Yearbook for History and Art 6] (in German). Volkach.
- Muth, Hanswernfried (2005). Volkach am Main. Katholische Stadtpfarrkirche St. Bartholomäus, Maria im Weingarten [Volkach on the Main. Catholic Parish Church St. Bartholomew, Mary in the Vineyard] (in German). Regensburg.
- Johannes Quirin. Weinorte in Franken: Entdecken ~ Entspannen ~ Entkorken [Wine Places in Franconia] (PDF) (in German). Droste.
- Stadler, Erika (2006). "Die Beginen auf dem Kirchberg zu Volkach" [The Beguines on the Kirchberg at Volkach]. In Feuerbach, Ute (ed.). Volkach 906-2006 (in German). Volkach.
- Treutwein, Karl (1987). Von Abtswind bis Zeilitzheim. Geschichtliches, Sehenswertes, Überlieferungen [From Abtswind to Zeilitzheim. History, Sights, Traditions] (in German). Volkach.
- Wehner, Georg (1968). Die Wallfahrtskirche St. Maria im Weingarten auf dem Kirchberg bei Volkach [The Pilgrimage Church St. Mary in the Vineyard on the Kirchberg near Volkach] (in German). Volkach.
