= Christoph Ehrlich =

German instrument maker

- Born: 22 April 1781; Waldenburg, Hohenlohe
- Died: 12 March 1830 (aged 48); Bamberg
- Occupation: Instrument maker
- Spouse: Margareth Diemer
- Parent(s): Johann Bernhard Ehrlich (father); Margaretha de Blanc (mother)

Christoph Ehrlich (22 April 1781 – 12 March 1830) was a German instrument maker based in Bamberg. Coming from a family of organ builders, he is known for manufacturing pianos, giraffe pianos, and guitars, as well as for establishing a unique subscription-based business model known as the "Instrument Distribution Establishment" (Instrumenten-Verschleiß-Anstalt).

== Early life and education ==
Christoph Ehrlich was born on 22 April 1781 in Waldenburg in the principality of Hohenlohe. He came from a family that had been famous for organ building in Franconia for over a century. His father was Johann Bernhard Ehrlich (1754–1810), a court and country organ builder, and his grandfather was the organ builder Johann Adam Ehrlich (1703–1784). His mother, Margaretha de Blanc, was French. Christoph had two sisters and a brother, Friderich Anton Ehrlich (1787–1811), who also trained as a mechanic and organ builder.

Ehrlich received extensive education. In addition to vocational training in his father's workshop, he was taught architectural drawing by the Provost of Hohenlohe-Oehringen, landscape drawing by Hering from Breslau, and music by Abbot Küffner of Würzburg.

== Career in Bamberg ==
During the Napoleonic Wars, Ehrlich served three years of military service and was wounded near Günzburg in 1805. He subsequently took a position in Bamberg around 1805/1806 in the workshop of the organ builder Karl Justus Hansen. After working for Hansen for nearly two years, he became the manager of the workshop of the organ builder Achatius Diemer (D 1807). Following Diemer's death, Ehrlich took over the business orders for the widow, Margareth Diemer, but did little work on organs.

To marry in Bamberg, Ehrlich was required to acquire citizenship. He received his citizenship rights on 14 December 1808, after paying a fee, and married Margareth Diemer on 9 January 1809 at St. Martin's Church. After his brother Friderich Anton died in 1811, his mother moved from Waldenburg to live with him in Bamberg. Ehrlich purchased a house and property on the Oberer Stephansberg, where he established his own workshop. In 1817, Christian Friedrich Gottlieb Thon listed "Ehrlich, in Bamberg" as a keyboard instrument maker in his volume on piano instruments.

=== Instrument Distribution Establishment ===
In 1812, Ehrlich published a plan for a "new Instrument Distribution Establishment" (neue Instrumenten-Verschleiß-Anstalt). This was a subscription system designed to allow customers to pay for instruments in installments: Ehrlich sought 125 buyers for pianos and 50 buyers for guitars, each paying a weekly rate (one Gulden for a piano; 30 Kreutzer for a guitar). Ehrlich committed to delivering one piano and one guitar weekly. The order of delivery was determined by a public lottery held at the royal police headquarters, with results published in local intelligence gazettes.

This system allowed the first drawn subscriber to receive an instrument immediately while continuing to pay installments, while the last subscriber received theirs upon the final payment. A second subscription plan was issued in 1816, expanding the distribution to cities including Nuremberg, Ansbach, and Würzburg. Through this system, Ehrlich sold approximately 375 pianos and grand pianos and roughly 150 guitars.

== Instruments ==
Ehrlich produced pianos, giraffe pianos, cabinet pianos, and guitars. While he produced a large number of guitars, few extant examples remain. Surviving instruments include a giraffe piano housed at the Geelvinck Music Museum in Zutphen, Netherlands. Although his workshop produced pianos and various stringed keyboard instruments, it remains uncertain whether he manufactured clavichords.

=== Guitars ===
Ehrlich's guitars exhibit characteristics of Classicism and Historicism, with notable French influences in the body outline. The headstocks were often designed in the shape of a lyre, indicating a preference for antiquity. A significant feature was the neck-body connection. The handle was completely inserted into the upper block, while the heel was added subsequently. This allowed for an elegantly curved heel shape compared to the straight flanks common in violin making. Ehrlich utilized a kidney-shaped sound hole, which is considered a specific quirk of his design. His guitars often featured 15 frets, a high number for the time when 12 frets were common in Germany, suggesting a focus on playability and tonal range.

Three specific guitars have been identified and analyzed by a guitar maker Thomas Ochs: two in the Historical Museum Bamberg (Inv.-Nr. 8/291 and 8/596) and one in the Bachhaus Eisenach (Inv.-Nr. 1.2.1.23). The Eisenach instrument was previously attributed to the school of J.A. Otto but shares significant construction details with the signed Ehrlich instruments, such as the kidney-shaped sound hole and the specific neck-body joint. Acoustic analysis of the instruments indicated that their sound quality was average for the period, with the larger model (8/596) rating slightly higher in quality than the smaller "ladies' guitar" (8/291).

=== Pianos ===
Ehrlich became a valued piano maker. Starting in 1812, he manufactured pianos and guitars in series. He is noted for his "upright grand pianos" (cabinet pianos, Giraffenflügel). Examples of these instruments can be viewed in the Württemberg State Museum in Stuttgart and the Handel House in Halle an der Saale.

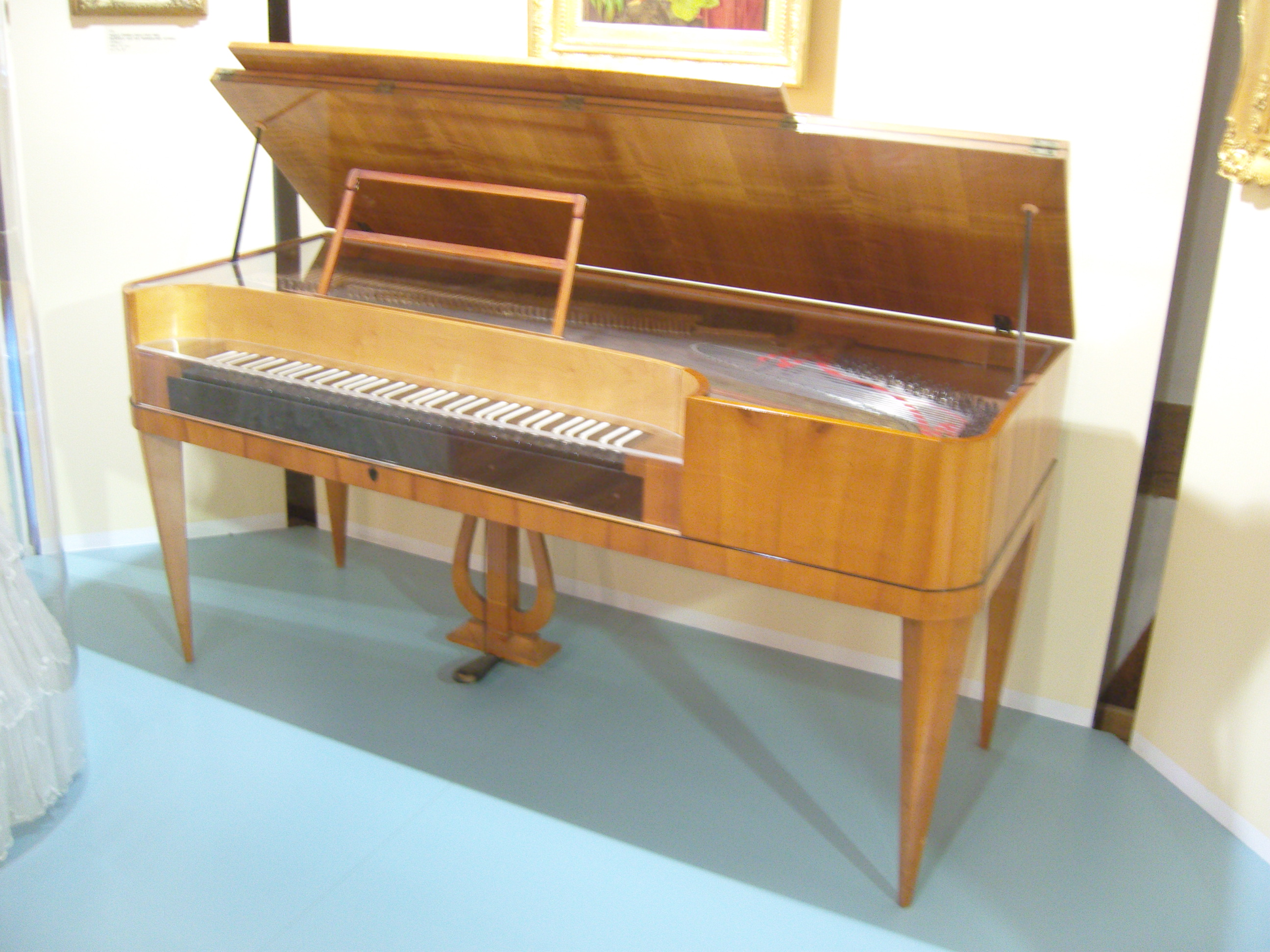
Piano (1824)

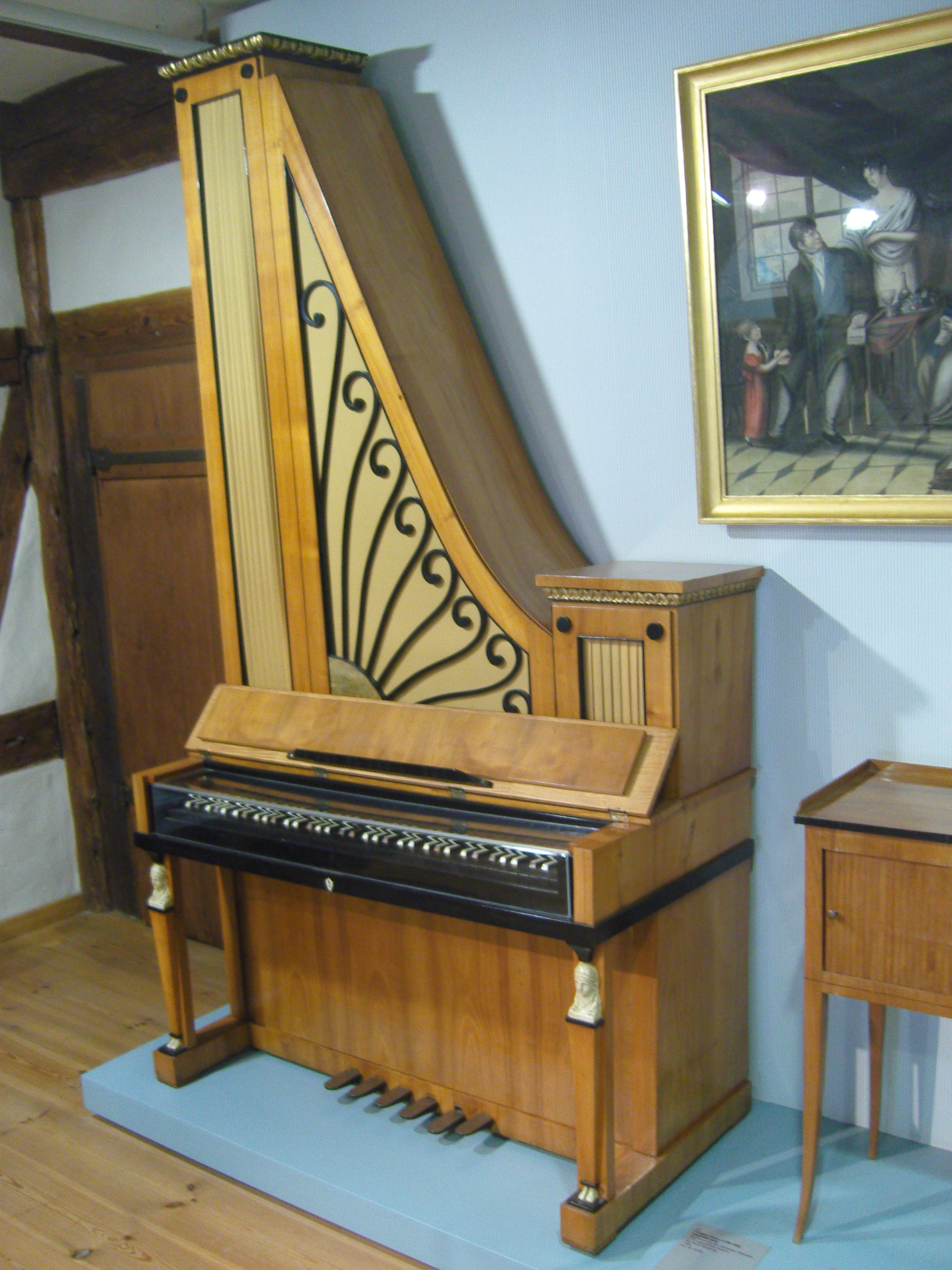
Giraffe piano (1828)

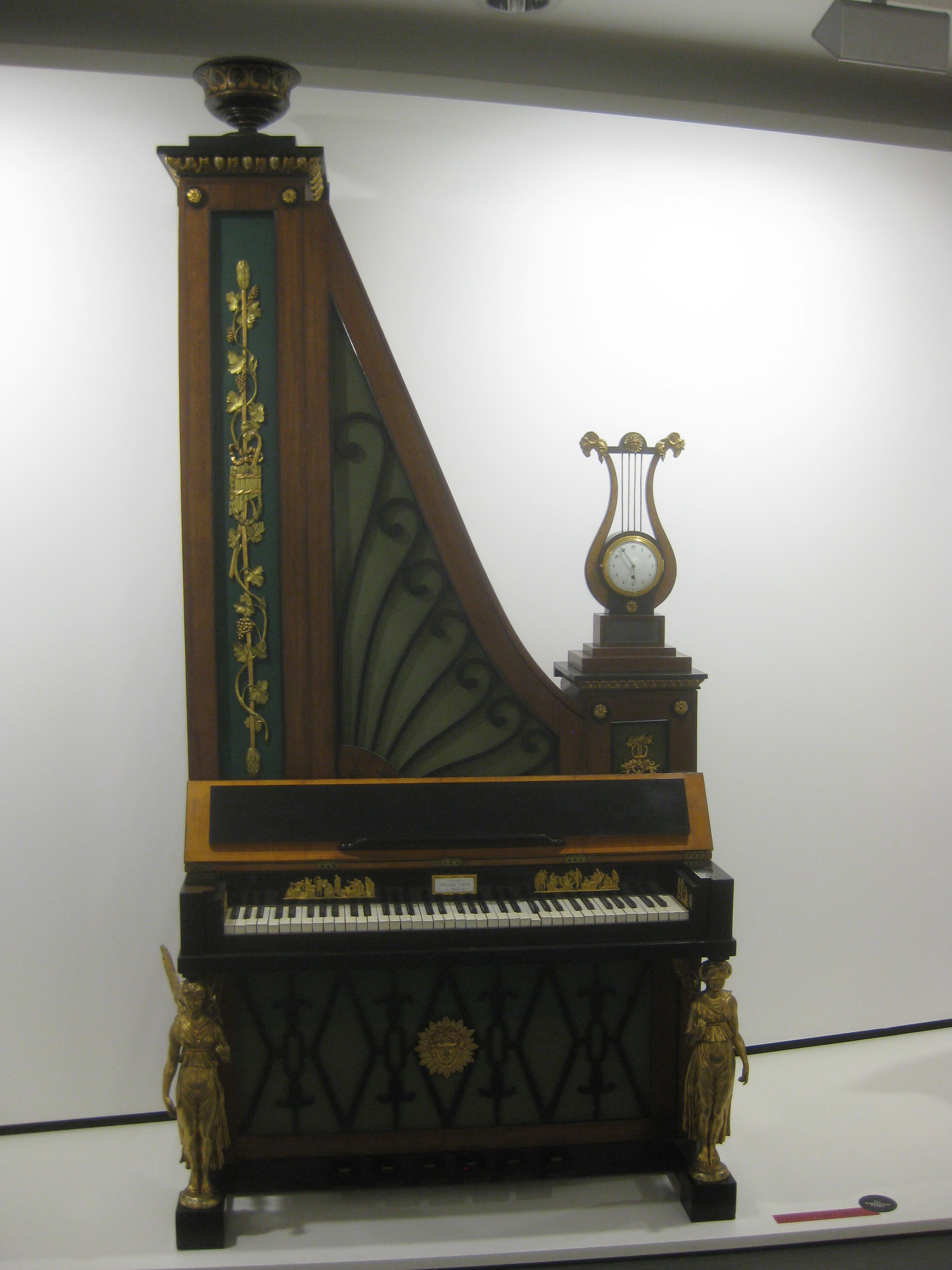
Giraffe piano

Guitars

== Death ==
Christoph Ehrlich died on 12 March 1830 and was buried two days later at the Unsere Liebe Frau (Upper Parish Church) in Bamberg. Historical accounts from Jäck suggest he died in poverty, noting that he could not rise to prosperity due to "too much thirst" (zu vielen Durstes).

== Sources ==
- Jäck, Heinrich Joachim (1843). Zweites Pantheon der Literaten und Künstler Bambergs vom XI. Jahrhunderte bis 1843 [Second Pantheon of the Literati and Artists of Bamberg from the 11th Century to 1843] (in German).
- Ochs, Thomas (2004). Der Instrumentenmacher Christoph Ehrlich (1781 – 1830) [Instrument maker Christoph Ehrlich (1781 – 1830)] (PDF) (Project Paper) (in German). Westsächsische Hochschule Zwickau.
- Volz, Rosemarie (1995). "Johann Adam Ehrlich (1703–1784) und Sohn Johann Anton Ehrlich (1742–1824) – zwei kunsterfahrene Orgel- und Instrumentenmacher" [Johann Adam Ehrlich (1703–1784) and Son Johann Anton Ehrlich (1742–1824) – Two Skilled Organ and Instrument Makers]. Württembergisch Franken (in German). 79. Schwäbisch Hall: 181–221.
- Whitehead, Lance (9 June 2025). "Instrument Maker Profile: Ehrlich, Christoph". Boalch: Makers of the Harpsichord and Clavichord 1440-1840.
- Wohnhaas, Theodor (1968). "Zur Tätigkeit Christoph Ehrlichs als Klavierbauer in Bamberg" [Regarding the activity of Christoph Ehrlich as a piano builder in Bamberg]. Bericht des Historischen Vereins für die Pflege der Geschichte des ehemaligen Fürstbistums Bamberg (in German). 104: 406–410.
