= Martin Seuffert =

Franz Martin Seuffert
- Born: c. 1772; Würzburg
- Died: July 3, 1847 (aged 74–75); Vienna
- Occupations: Organ builder, Piano maker
- Children: Eduard Seuffert
- Parent: Franz Ignaz Seuffert
- Relatives: Johann Philipp Seuffert (grandfather); Friedrich Ehrbar (successor)

Franz Martin Seuffert (born c. 1772 in Würzburg; died 3 July 1847 in Vienna) was a German-Austrian organ builder and piano maker.

== Biography ==
Martin Seuffert came from a well-known Main-Franconian family of organ builders. His grandfather Johann Philipp Seuffert and his father Franz Ignaz Seuffert were court organ makers in Würzburg. Consequently, Martin Seuffert initially learned the trade of organ building. An organ built by him in 1794 is preserved in the pilgrimage church Maria im Weingarten in Volkach in the district of Kitzingen.

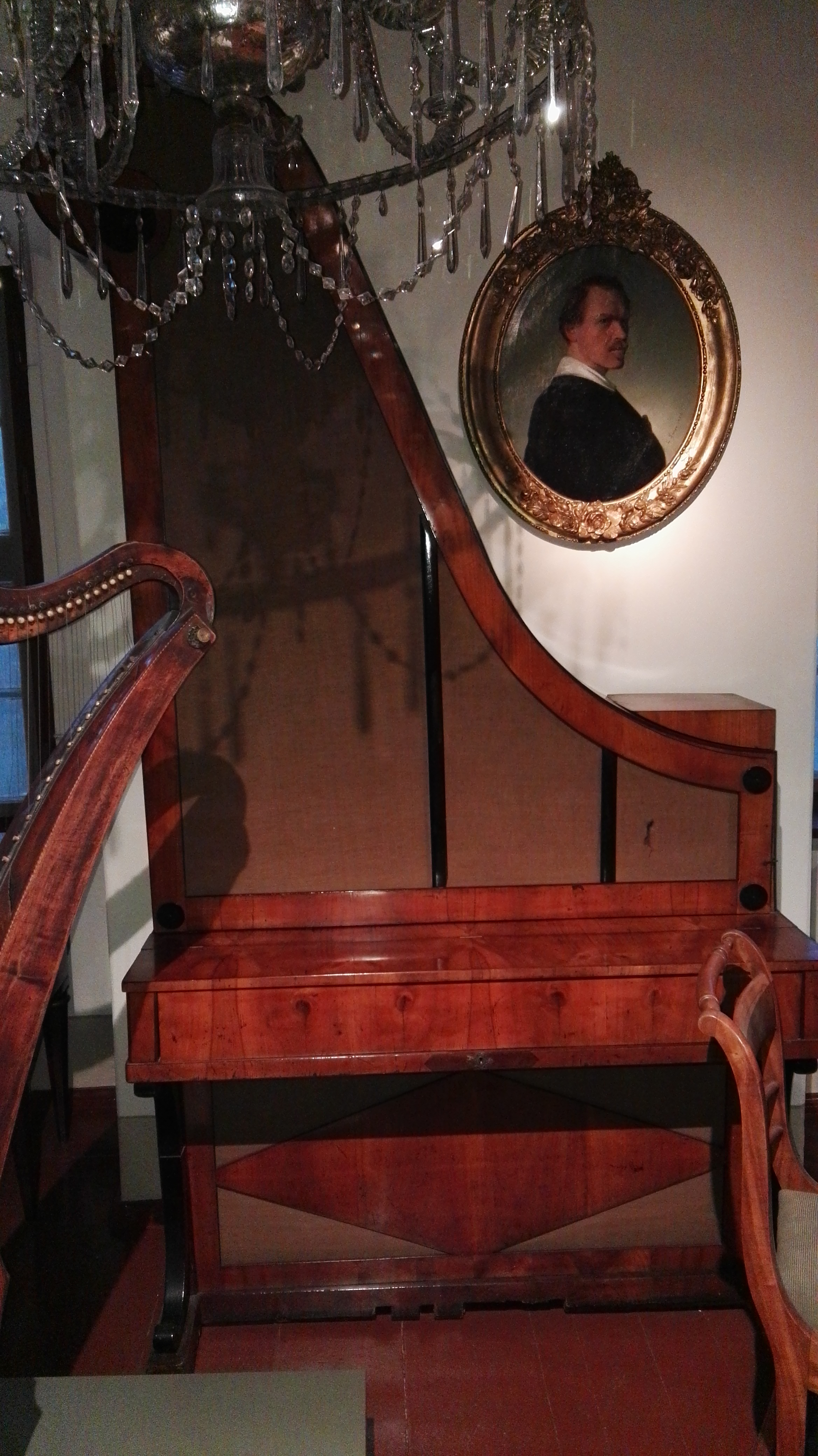
Giraffe piano by Martin Seuffert (c. 1830)

He moved to Vienna to further his education in piano making under Anton Walter. Subsequently, he worked at the firm Wachtl & Comp. (founded in 1802) alongside Joseph Wachtl and J. F. Bleyer on the development of an upright fortepiano, known as a giraffe piano.

Following a dispute over the rights to this invention, Seuffert left the company in 1811 and opened his own workshop at the address "in Wieden at the Alleegasse 75-76". In the same year, he received Viennese citizenship and his master craftsman's rights.

In 1815, Ludwig van Beethoven mentioned Seuffert in a letter to Joseph von Varena in Graz. Beethoven had been looking for a piano for Varena's daughter and replied that one could obtain a good six-octave piano either from Johann Schantz for 400 Gulden or from Seuffert for 460 Gulden.

From 1819, Seuffert's address was "in the Wieden on the Favoritengasse at the golden stag" (zum goldenen Hirschen)). In 1827, he associated himself with the piano maker Johann Seidler, running the company under the name Seuffert und Seidler. In 1836, he received a privilege (patent) for his improvements to the Piano Droit ("upright piano"). He was awarded a gold medal for his work at the Vienna Industrial Products Exhibition in 1845.

In 1845, his son Eduard Seuffert (1819–1855) also joined the business, and instruments from the years 1845/46 were signed "Seuffert Sohn und Seidler". After Martin Seuffert's death in 1847, his son took over the business as the sole owner. When Eduard Seuffert died only eight years later, his widow married Friedrich Ehrbar, under whose name the company achieved high prestige and existed until the 1980s.

== Instruments ==
Three grand fortepianos by Martin Seuffert are known to exist. The oldest (corresponding to the Beethoven letter, c. 1815, or perhaps earlier) is in the possession of the association TonArt e.V. in Wolfenbüttel; it was completely restored in 2022. The second is in the Frederick Historical Piano Collection in Ashburnham, Massachusetts, and the third is in the private collection of Robert Brown in Austria.

There are several upright pianos by him in private collections as well as in the Christopher Hogwood collection (UK). A giraffe piano by Martin Seuffert is currently in the Kunsthistorisches Museum in Vienna, and another is in the Federal Collection of Old Period Furniture (Bundessammlung Alter Stilmöbel) in Vienna.

An unrestored grand piano by "Seuffert & Seidler" is in the Pooya Radbon Collection of historical fortepianos. The same collection also contains a pianino by the firm Seuffert Sohn & Seidler. The aforementioned grand piano belonging to TonArt e.V. was previously in this collection as well.

An upright harp-shaped fortepiano, a donation by Rosalie Falk from the estate of Johannes Daniel Falk, was transferred from the Weimar City Museum to the Kirms-Krackow-Haus in 1916, where it can still be viewed today.

== Sources ==
- Baur, Wolfgang (2018). "Historische Orgeln an der Mainschleife" [Historical Organs on the Mainschleife]. In Feuerbach, Ute (ed.). Unsere Mainschleife. Beiträge zu Kunst und Geschichte an der Volkacher Mainschleife. Januar 2008–Dezember 2017 [Our Mainschleife. Contributions to Art and History at the Volkach Main Loop. January 2008–December 2017]. Volkacher Hefte (in German). Vol. 18. Volkach.
- Katalog der Sammlung alter Musikinstrumente, I. Teil: Saitenklaviere. Vienna: Kunsthistorisches Museum. 1966. (in German)
- Fischer, Hermann (2015). Der Orgelbauer Johann Philipp Seuffert und seine Nachkommen in Würzburg, Kirrweiler und Wien (in German). Würzburg: Kommissionsverlag Ferdinand Schöningh. pp. 79–82. ISBN 978-3-87717-077-9.
- "Meet the Frederick Piano Collection". The Frederick Historical Piano Collection. Ashburnham, Massachusetts.
- "Seuffert & Seidler in Wien ca.1827". Radbon Fortepiano Workshop & Collection.
