= Giraffe piano =

Musical instrument

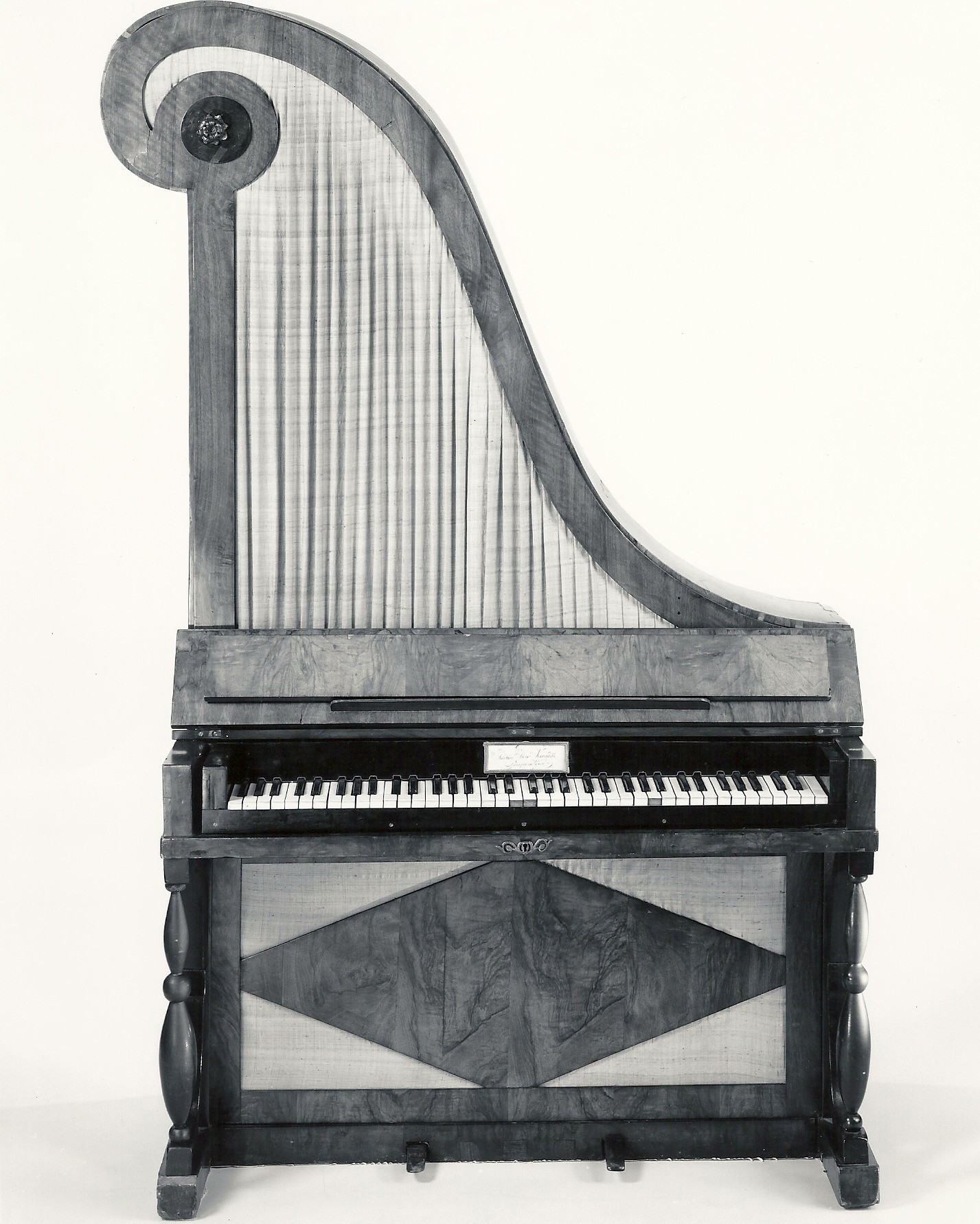
- Inventor(s): Martin Seuffert, Joseph Wachtl, and Jakob F. Bleyer
- Developed: 1805

Related instruments
- Clavicytherium; Pyramid piano; Lyre piano; Pianino

The giraffe piano is a type of an upright piano that has a "long-necked" appearance due to a narrow, but tall, upright case, essentially a grand piano set up vertically. The design had been invented in Austria around 1805 and was manufactured throughout the first half of the 19th century. This "monstrosity" eventually evolved into the modern upright piano ("pianino"). Two closely related instruments, similar in construction, but different in shape, are called the pyramid piano and the lyre piano (see the History section below).

== Invention ==
Modern sources credit the invention of the Giraffe piano to Martin Seuffert, although a dispute about the authorship was already ongoing in 1811, with Seuffert accused of falsely representing himself as an inventor:

Martin Seufert imitates our invention, and writes on each name tag: Invented by Martin Seuffert in Vienna. I wish I knew what entitles him to this miserable arrogance??

Seuffert himself at the time acknowledged collaboration with Wachtl and Bleyer, although denied Bleyer's claims:

Bleyer […] contacted me and Wachtl 7 years ago, and we worked on the invention of new mechanics and a better shape for the upright fortepianos, brought them through joint thinking and effort to the degree of perfection […], and as equal partners in the whole company put our names together on advertisements and signs.

== Design ==
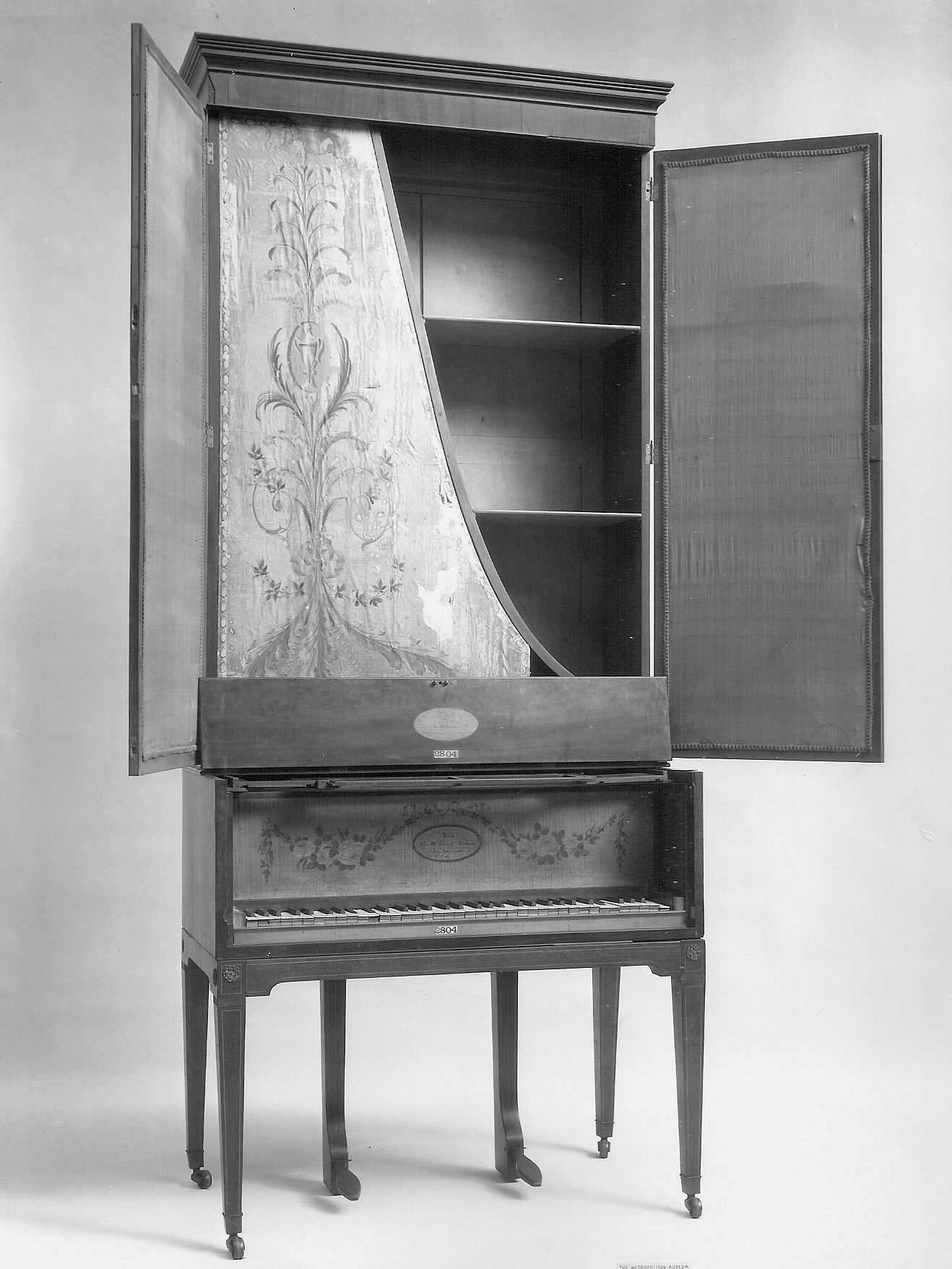
Cabinet piano (1801)

The narrow end of the instrument was frequently capped by a large scroll resembling giraffe's head. Alternatively, the space on the side was used for the display shelves. The enclosed shelves produced a boxy look, resulting in the appellation "cabinet piano" (not to be confused with the more modern cabinet grand). The pianos mostly used the German action with hammers below the keys and typically had four pedals. Until the turn of the 19th century, the pin block was placed above the keyboard, so the cases had to be quite tall. Moving the pin block to the top of the frame and sloping the string plane cleared the path to the modern upright piano design – and eventually ended the era of the 19th century upright grand pianos.

== History ==
The development of the upright grand versions of pianos in the 18th-19th centuries was spurred by the need to reduce the space taken by the grand pianos, at the time about 2.5 by 1.5 meters; the size of more compact square pianos was also increasing. Vertical design, with the soundboard oriented toward audience, allowed to produce full sound in аn instrument with a smaller footprint. The idea of a vertical placement of strings is very old: clavicytherium, an upright version of the harpsichord, was known as early as 1480.

The first upright hammer-action grand piano was constructed in Italy by Domenico Del Mela in 1739. The development then shifted to Vienna, with Christian Ernst Friederici creating the first pyramid piano in 1745. After a hiatus, the uprights experienced a renaissance in Austria in the early 19th century (Seuffert, Wachtl, Bleyer) with significant contributions by Christoph Ehrlich in Germany. The instruments featured two to six pedals, controlling the piano, sustaining, bassoon-register, and sometimes "janissary" (drum and bells) functions (Friederici also used hand stops). The lyre piano, made popular by Johann Christian Schleip in 1820s was the last iteration of the upright grand piano design.

== Modern re-invention ==
Pianist Sarah Nicolls has experimented with a vertical grand piano, and is using carbon fibre for the frame, which allows the instrument to weigh just 60kg. The original giraffe pianos used cast iron frames and could weigh as much as 200kg, and were so unstable that they could topple over. One of the reasons for the design is to allow pianists to easily pluck the strings (pizzicato) when directed by composers.

== Gallery ==
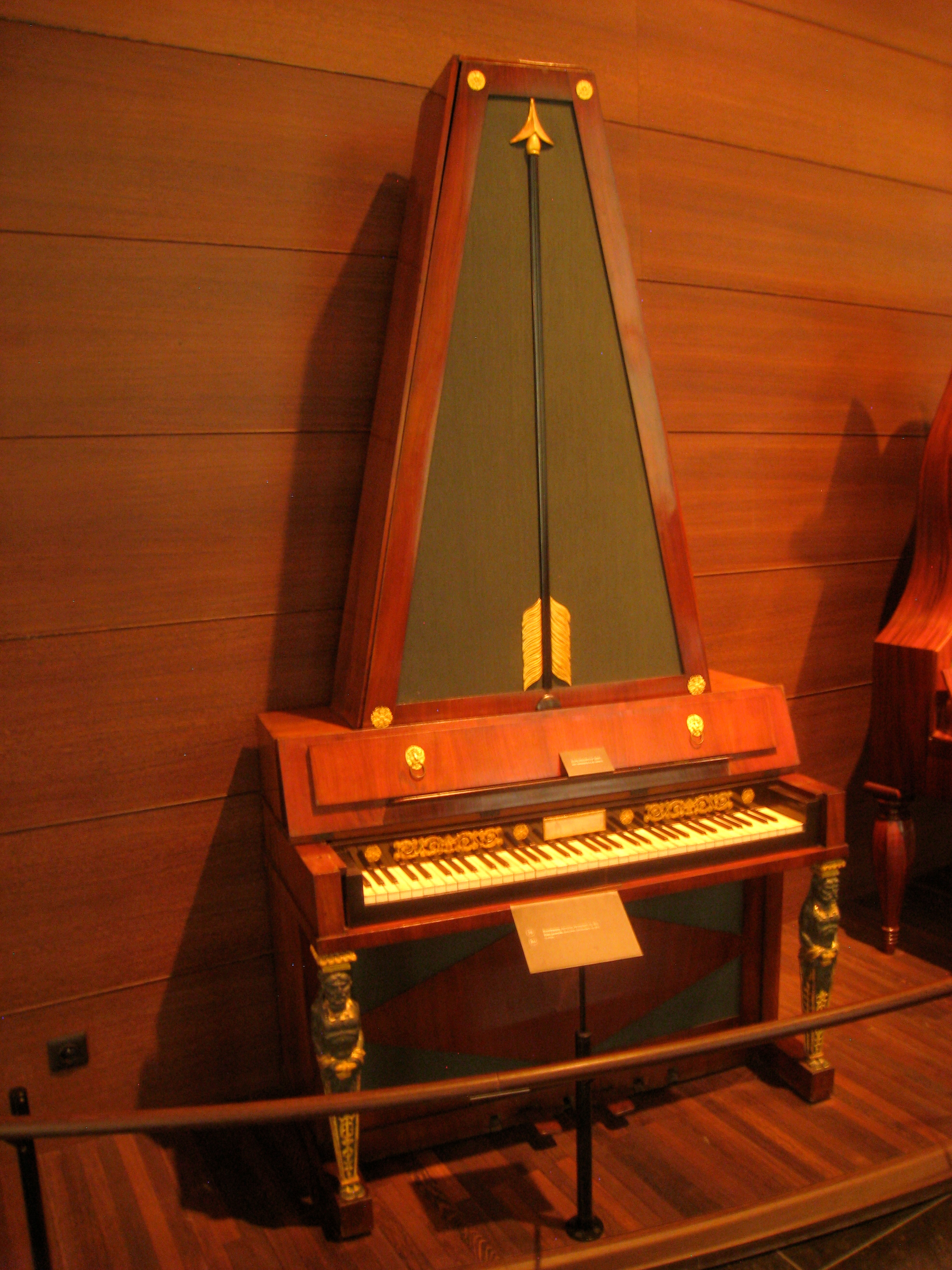
Pyramid piano (c. 1815)

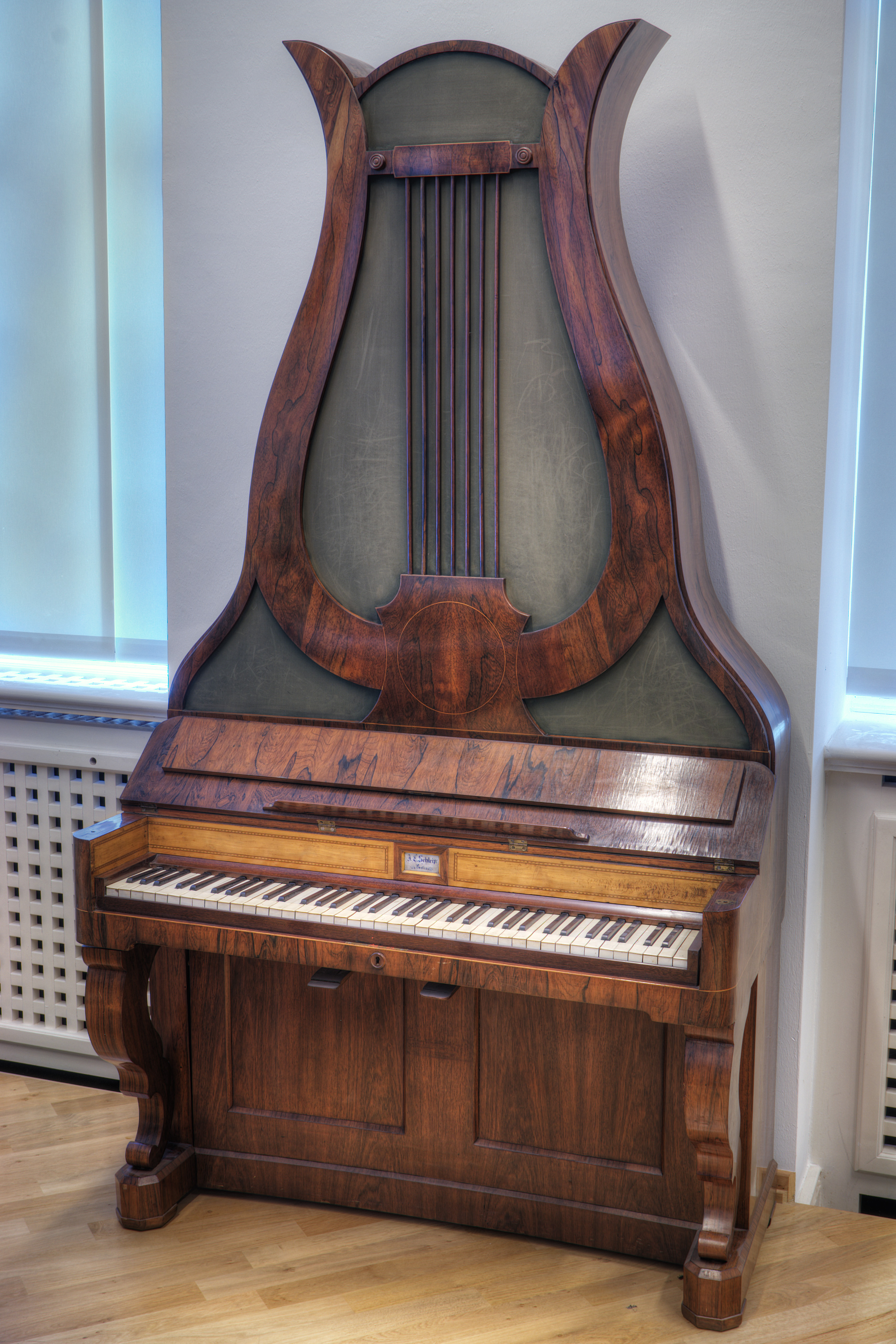
Lyre piano by Schleip (1820)

== See also ==
- Euphonicon
- Claviharp

== Sources ==
- Gloag, John; Edwards, Clive (1991). "Giraffe Piano". A Complete Dictionary of Furniture. Overlook Press. p. 353. ISBN 978-0-87951-414-3. OCLC 1063834296.
- Giraffenklavier. In: Curt Sachs: Real-Lexikon der Musikinstrumente. Julius Bard, Berlin 1913, S. 158 b (Giraffe piano at the Internet Archive)
- Wier, Albert Ernest (1940). "The Giraffe Piano". The Piano: Its History, Makers, Players and Music. Longmans, Green and Company. p. 55. OCLC 27792371.
- Palmieri, Robert, ed. (1 June 2004). The Piano: An Encyclopedia (2 ed.). Routledge. ISBN 978-1-135-94964-8.
- Ferguson, Kathleen Benz (1969). The pedals of the piano: A study of their functions, uses, and pedagogical methods (MA). University of Wyoming.
- James, Philip (1930). "Early Keyboard Instruments". Proceedings of the Royal Musical Association. 57: 23–39. doi:10.1093/jrma/57.1.23. eISSN 2632-7716. ISSN 0958-8442.
- Swenson, Edward E. (1989). "Fortepiano building in Vienna as reflected in the dispute between Jakob Bleyer and Martin Seuffert" (PDF). FoMRHI Quarterly. 56: 70–73, 75.
