= Claviharp =

19th-century musical instrument

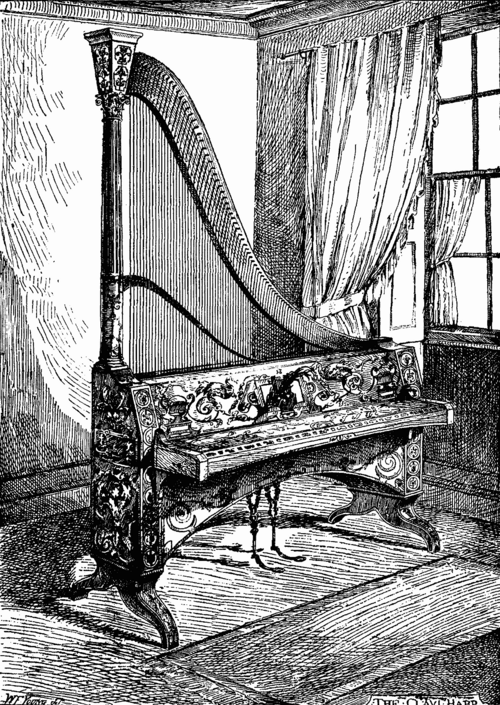
An image of a claviharp from the 1891 Scientific American

The claviharp, also known as the harp piano, xenorphica, or Keyboard Harp, is a 19th-century musical instrument that combined a harp with a keyboard. Despite mentions of this instrument in previous centuries (see Juan Hidalgo), Johann Christian Dietz has been recognized as the inventor of the instrument in 1813. His grandfather was one of the first upright piano manufacturers. Struck by what he saw as difficulties and defects of the harp, in 1810, he built an instrument à cordes pincées à clavier, which connected a keyboard to the harp strings.

He made the instrument to address limitations of the harp—susceptibility of catgut strings to atmospheric change, inconsistency of sound as finger motion varies, limited diatonic scale (without pedals), and lack of dampers. The claviharp's keyboard plucked the strings (as a harpsichord) rather than strike them (as a piano). It was essentially a 6 Octave Tenor Upright Harpsichord that uses Special Strings to emulate the sound of a Harp.

== Features ==
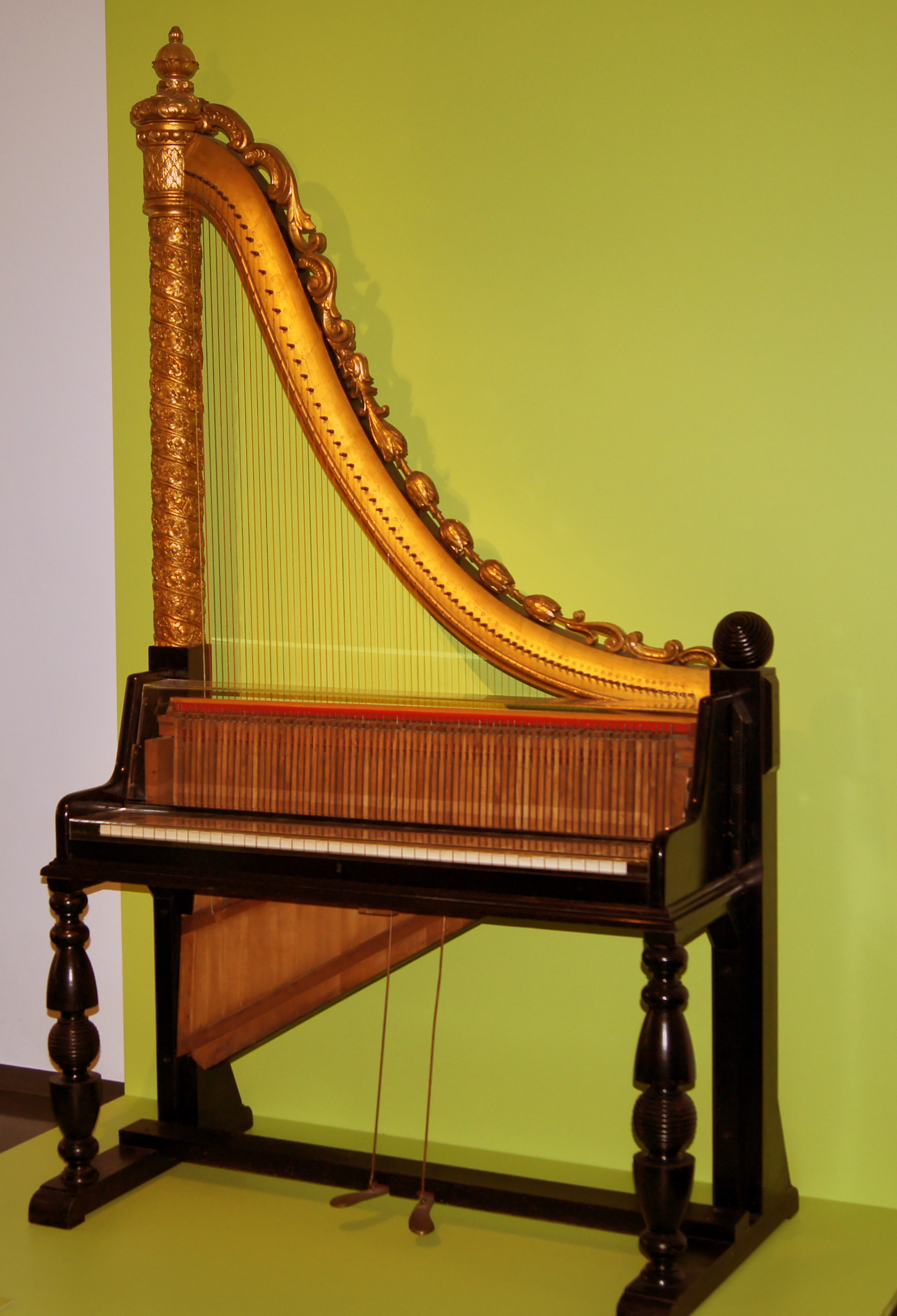
Claviharp, Ignaz Lutz (?), Vienna, c. 1891; Haus der Musik ("Fruchtkasten"), Landesmuseum Württemberg, Stuttgart (Germany)

The claviharp used metal strings covered with an insulating material to better stay in tune. Its keyboard was the same as that of other keyboard instruments, so permitting the playing of chromatic scales. The instrument had two pedals. One sustained or dampened the strings, and the second divided certain strings into two equal parts to provide harmonic octaves. The instrument was much lighter and transportable than a piano.

== See also ==
- Giraffe piano, a piano with a similar appearance
- Clavicytherium, a similar older instrument
