= Princess Therese of Bavaria =

Bavarian princess, scientist, philanthropist

Princess Therese
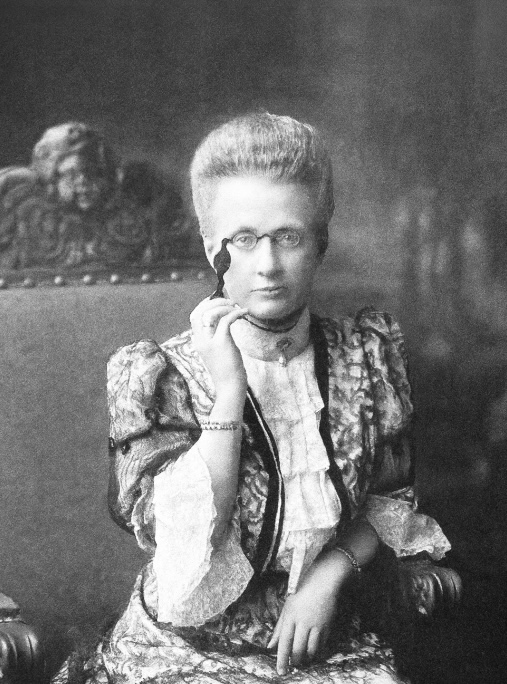
- Born: 12 November 1850; Munich, Kingdom of Bavaria, German Confederation
- Died: 19 December 1925 (aged 75); Lindau, Bavaria, German Reich
- Burial: Theatinerkirche
Names
- Therese Charlotte Marianne Auguste
- House: Wittelsbach
- Father: Luitpold, Prince Regent of Bavaria
- Mother: Princess Auguste of Tuscany

Royal Monogram

Princess Therese of Bavaria (German: Therese Charlotte Marianne Auguste Prinzessin von Bayern; 12 November 1850 in Munich – 19 December 1925 in Lindau) was an ethnologist, zoologist, botanist, travel writer and leader in social care.

Therese was the third child and only daughter of Luitpold, Prince Regent of Bavaria, and of his wife Archduchess Augusta of Austria.

== Life ==
Therese descended from the House of Wittelsbach, one of Europe's most powerful royal families which had ruled Bavaria for 738 years. However, by the time she was born, the Bavarian crown's political power had been reduced and the 19th Century Wittelsbach kings were mostly remembered for their cultural patronage and the architectural legacy. She was born Princess Therese Charlotte Marianne Augusta of Bavaria in Munich and was the only daughter of the Prince Regent Luitpold of Bavaria and his wife, Augusta of Austria, the daughter of Leopold II, Grand Duke of Tuscany. Through her mother she was also descended from Empress Maria Theresa.

As a child, she was instructed at home alongside her two brothers, Arnulf and Ludwig (later King Ludwig III, the last Bavarian king). She was particularly close to Arnulf, with whom she shared a keen interest in geography. Therese showed an extraordinary ability for languages, as well as a keen interest in plants. She would eventually become fluent in 12 languages, both spoken and written. She was tutored in modern Greek and Russian together with Arnulf. Although she did attend some public courses for ladies, most of her education was provided by private tutors. While she had some enthusiasm for mathematics, her interest for natural sciences and foreign lands was significant. She also engaged in physical activities, such as swimming, bicycling and mountain walking.

In 1864, when Therese was 13, her mother died of tuberculosis. As the only female member of her immediate family, Therese took over the management of the household with the help of her aunt. That same year, her cousin, 18-year-old Ludwig became Ludwig II of Bavaria.

== Scientific practice ==
Therese made a substantial contribution to plant and animal geography. She engaged in scientific practice for more than 30 years, foreshadowing the vigor of science in the 20th century. Her interests in geology, botany, anthropology and zoology required her to attain tutors, since women at the time were not allowed to study at universities. Women were finally allowed into universities in 1903, when Therese's father, Prince Regent Luitpold, legalized their admission.

In 1871, at the age of 21, she started a series of journeys, first to Italy and Greece, then throughout Europe and North Africa, the Middle East and the Americas. In 1888, she visited Brazil (together with three companions, including the travel marshal 1st Lieutenant of the cavalry Maximilian Freiherr von Speidel), and, in 1893, North America and Mexico. A tour of South America followed in 1898. Before visiting a country, she studied the history of the land and its people, the local language and literature. She would usually travel with a group of people who served her, including a lady-in-waiting, and usually chose to travel incognito as "Countess Elpen," a practice not uncommon among the nobility. She wrote a number of books about these excursions in which she described the natural history of the places she visited. Her early works were published under the pseudonym "Th. v. Bayer".

=== Expedition to Brazil ===
Therese arrived on the mouth of the Amazon River on the 25 June 1888. In the company of a servant trained in taxidermy, a lady in waiting, and a Kavalier for her protection, she travelled 1000 miles upriver to Manaus. From there they traveled up the Rio Negro. Along the way, Therese collected plants and animals, such as monkeys, birds, snakes, and butterflies. She hired a creole guide who spoke 15 Indigenous languages and, with his help, bargained for ethnological artifacts. She collected weapons, such as spears, darts with iron tips, wooden arrows, but also pottery and utensils. She then traveled down the coast to Rio de Janeiro, with a considerable collection that included live animals. A railway trip through the high mountains of the Campos country followed, where she acquired a sizable collection of mineral specimens and visited the Academy of Mines in Ouro Preto. The collection of artefacts was continued throughout her trip along the Rio Santa Maria.

Where she could, she visited local museums and botanical gardens, studying the collections of the National Museum of Brazil in Rio de Janeiro in great detail. In Rio de Janeiro she also met with Princess Imperial of Brazil Isabel, who had sponsored scientific expeditions and helped to establish collections that publicised Brazilian gems, minerals, plants, flowers, birds, butterflies and insects.

After Therese returned to Bavaria, it took her nine years to compile an analysis of the Brazilian collection. Her publication Meine Reise in die Brasilianischen Tropen (My Trip to the Brazilian Tropics), an illustrated travel journal of botanical, geological, and zoological information, was published in 1897.

=== Engagement with Munich's academic institutions ===
In 1892, Therese became the first woman to be given honorary membership in the Bavarian Academy of Sciences and Humanities. The same year, she became an honorary member of the Munich Geographical Society. In 1897, she became the first woman to receive an honorary doctorate from the Ludwig-Maximilians-Universität München. She was also a corresponding member of the Berlin Entomological Society and her collection of anthropological materials from South America became part of the collection of the State Museum of Ethnology in Munich.

== Later years ==
Therese died in Lindau.

Prince Christopher of Greece, her second cousin once removed, remembered her in his memoirs:

One relation who came to visit us off and on was my mother's cousin, Princess Therese of Bavaria, who amazed everyone with her erudition; she could speak twenty different languages and answered freely in any one she happened to be addressed in. She was an extremely interesting personality, a well-known scientist and great explorer; there were few parts of the globe she had not visited, hunting for flora and fauna.

== Honours ==
- Austria-Hungary : Decoration of Honour for Arts and Sciences, 1908
- Spain : 629th Dame of the Order of Queen Maria Luisa - .
- Honorary doctorate, from the Ludwig-Maximilians-Universität München
- Honorary member of the Bavarian Academy of Science

A species of Peruvian lizard, Microlophus theresiae, is named in her honour.

== Published works ==
- Ausflug nach Tunis (Excursion to Tunis). 1880.
- Reiseeindrücke und Skizzen aus Russland (Impressions and Sketches from Russia). Stuttgart 1885.
- Über den Polarkreis (On the Polar Circle). 1889.
- Über mexikanische Seen (On Mexican lakes). Wien 1895.
- Meine Reise in den Brasilianischen Tropen (My Trips in the Brazilian Tropics). Dietrich Remmer, Berlin 1897.
- Einiges über die Pueblo-Indianer. In: Völkerschau, 2 1902, 4–6, 38–42.
- Reisestudien aus dem westlichen Südamerika (Study Trips to the western part of South America). 2 volumes.
  - Volume I, Berlin 1908
  - Volume II, Berlin 1908

== Ancestry ==
Ancestors of Princess Therese of Bavaria

8. Maximilian I Joseph of Bavaria
4. Ludwig I of Bavaria
9. Princess Augusta Wilhelmine of Hesse-Darmstadt
2. Luitpold, Prince Regent of Bavaria
10. Frederick, Duke of Saxe-Altenburg
5. Princess Therese of Saxe-Hildburghausen
11. Duchess Charlotte Georgine of Mecklenburg-Strelitz
1. Princess Therese of Bavaria
12. Ferdinand III, Grand Duke of Tuscany
6. Leopold II, Grand Duke of Tuscany
13. Princess Luisa of Naples and Sicily
3. Archduchess Auguste Ferdinande of Austria
14. Maximilian, Hereditary Prince of Saxony
7. Princess Maria Anna of Saxony
15. Princess Carolina of Parma

== Films ==
- Wolfgang Voelker: Prinzessin Therese von Bayern - Forscherin, Sammlerin, Weltreisende. Dokumentarfilm, 1997, gesendet auf Phoenix am Sa, 15. Februar 2003, 21.00 Uhr (Google-Cache der Phoenix-Seite)
