= Battle of Nagyszeben (1916) =

- Part of the Battle of Transylvania of the Romanian Campaign of World War I
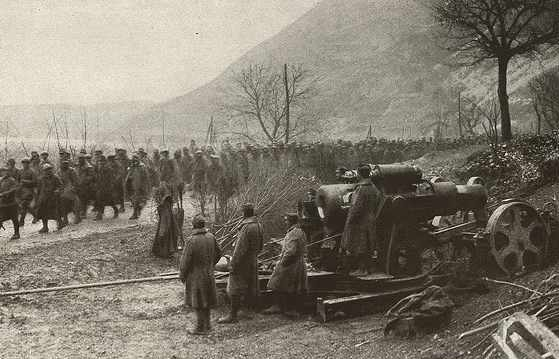
- Romanian prisoners marching by Austro-Hungarian artillery in the Red Tower Pass after the battle
Date	26–29 September 1916
Location	Southeastern Transylvania, Austria-Hungary (Szeben, Fogaras and Nagy-Küküllő counties) and northwestern Wallachia, Romania (Vâlcea and Argeș counties)
Result	Decisive Central Powers victory

Belligerents
Romania	German Empire; Austria-Hungary

Commanders and leaders
(Kingdom of Romania) Ioan Culcer (Kingdom of Romania) Ioan Popovici: (Kingdom of Romania) Matei Castriș; (Kingdom of Romania) Ioan Oprescu; (Kingdom of Romania) David Praporgescu (Kingdom of Romania) Toma Popescu (Kingdom of Romania) Grigore Crăiniceanu (Kingdom of Romania) Grigore Simionescu	(German Empire) Erich von Falkenhayn (German Empire) Hermann von Staabs: (German Empire) Edwin Sunkel; (Austria-Hungary) Béla Tanárky; (German Empire) Hugo Elster von Elstermann; (German Empire) Konrad Krafft von Dellmensingen: (German Empire) Franz Ritter von Epp; (German Empire) Ludwig Ritter von Tutschek; (German Empire) Eberhard Graf von Schmettow (German Empire) Friedrich Freiherr von Lüttwitz (Austria-Hungary) Arthur Arz von Straußenburg (German Empire) Curt von Morgen: (Austria-Hungary) Anton Goldbach von Sulittaborn

Units involved
1st Army: I Corps; 13th Division; 23rd Division; 20th Division; Toma Popescu Detachment; 2nd Army: 3rd Division; 4th Division; 6th Division	9th Army: XXXIX Reserve Corps; 187th Division; 51st Honvéd Division; 76th Reserve Division; Alpine Corps; Bavarian Guard Regiment; Jäger Brigade; Cavalry Corps Schmettow; 3rd German Cavalry Division; 1st Austro-Hungarian Cavalry Division; 89th Infantry Division; 1st Army: I Reserve Corps; 71st Austro-Hungarian Infantry Division

Strength
I Corps: 20,000+ (25 battalions of over 800 men); 16 batteries (2 heavy); 3 aircraft (1 operational) Toma Popescu Detachment (26 June): 1 Jäger battalion 2 howitzers 1 militia platoon (15 men)	XXXIX Corps: 17,500–21,000 (35 battalions of 500–600 men); 54 batteries (13 heavy) Alpine Corps: 9 battalions 2 mountain batteries

Casualties and losses
I Corps (1st Army): 3,000 prisoners 13 guns captured 6 machine-guns captured 2 aircraft captured 2nd Army: Unknown total 1 aircraft captured	Unknown total 300 prisoners (28–29 September)

The Battle of Nagyszeben was a World War I military engagement fought between the forces of the Central Powers (Germany and Austria-Hungary) on one side and the forces of Romania on the other side. It was the decisive engagement during the Battle of Transylvania, and also the largest, involving four armies out of the five fighting in the region: two Romanian, one German, and one Austro-Hungarian.

German General Erich von Falkenhayn planned to surround and annihilate the entire I Corps of General Ioan Culcer's Romanian 1st Army. Although this failed - the bulk of the Romanian force including almost its entire artillery managing to escape - the battle was still decisive in that it compelled the Romanian abandonment of Transylvania. Midway into the battle, the Romanian 2nd Army tried to relieve the besieged I Corps, attacking both the flank of the German 9th Army and the western flank of the Austro-Hungarian 1st Army. Thus, in the second half of the battle, two more armies joined the fray.

== Background ==
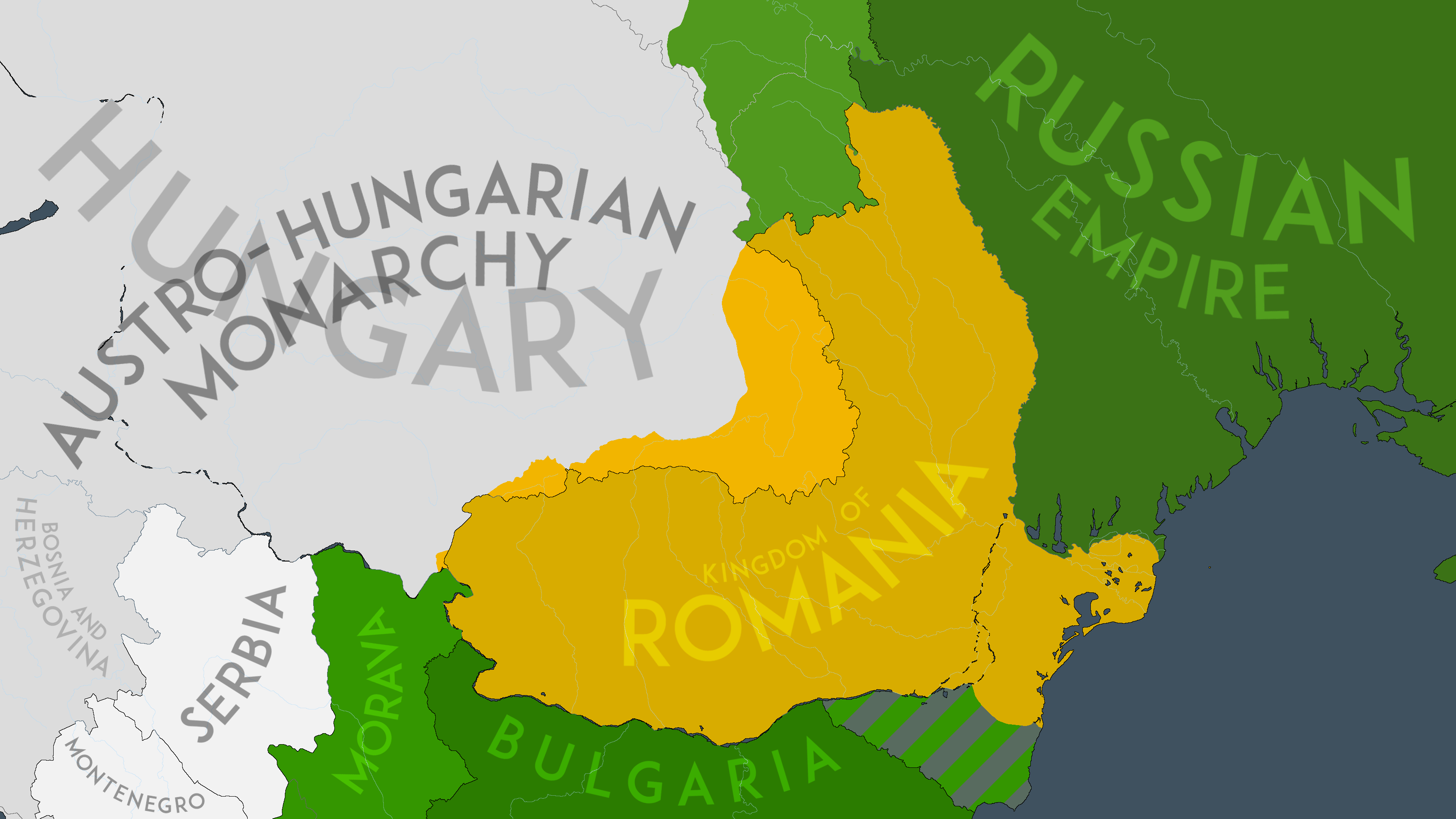
The map of the region on 26 September 1916, at the start of the Battle of Sibiu.

At the onset of the Romanian Campaign, starting on 27 August 1916 with the Battle of Transylvania, the Romanian 1st Army, under the command of General Ioan Culcer, consisted of six divisions, of which four comprised the I Corps, under the command of General Ioan Popovici. In the middle of September, General Culcer moved the I Corps headquarters to Nagytalmács (Tălmaciu/Talmesch). General Popovici arrived in Nagytalmács along with his staff on 16 September. Popovici had two divisions under his command at Nagyszeben (Sibiu/Hermannstadt): the 13th and the 23rd. While concentrating their forces northwest of Nagyszeben in preparation for the impending battle for that city, the Germans kept the Romanians under artillery fire in order to keep them from sending out patrols that could have discovered the German build-up. Romanian frustration with having to endure this bombardment boiled over, and on 22 September General Popovici ordered his 13th Division to take the heights at Veresmart (Roșia/Rothberg), east of Nagyszeben. Although this action was against Culcer's orders, it was still Culcer himself who decided to appoint Popovici as commander of the two Romanian divisions headquartered at Nagytalmács. Although Popovici's attack failed in its immediate aim, it succeeded in worsening the strategic situation of the Central Powers, driving a wedge between the two divisions of a German-led Cavalry Corps. If exploited, this wedge could ruin the German plans to secure Nagyszeben (Sibiu/Hermannstadt). On the following day (23 September), the German Alpine Corps began their march through the mountains to the Red Tower pass, behind Romanian lines. During the march of the German Alpine Corps, the left of the Central Powers forces - the German column which was to encircle the Romanians from the east - succeeded in forcing the crossing of the Olt River at Kolun (Colun/Kellen), east of Porumbák. Thus, an effective barrier was created between the 1st and the 2nd Romanian armies. In its advance across the mountain ridge separating the valleys of the Hortobágy (Hârtibaciu/Haarbach) and Olt Rivers, this German column was faced with determined resistance. Still, its numerical superiority enabled it to prevail. By the evening of 25 September, Kolun was in German hands.

=== Falkenhayn's plan ===
On 19 September, Erich von Falkenhayn assumed command of the German 9th Army. This army subsequently started assembling the bulk of its forces near Nagyszeben. Von Falkenhayn divided his forces into three groups: the XXXIX Reserve Corps, the Alpine Corps and Cavalry Corps Schmettow. His plan was bold: the annihilation of the Romanian units around Nagyszeben. Konrad Krafft von Dellmensingen's Alpine Corps Division was to act as an anvil, seizing the Red Tower Pass in order to block a Romanian retreat. Hermann von Staabs's Corps, assembling northwest of Nagyszeben, was to act as a hammer, driving southeast towards the mouth of the Red Tower Pass at Nagytalmács (Tălmaciu/Talmesch). With the Alpine Corps blocking the Romanian line of retreat, the XXXIX Corps would smash the Romanians against the mountains. Von Schmettow's cavalry had to maintain contact with the Austro-Hungarian 1st Army, make sure that none of the Romanians escaped east, and block any reinforcements coming from the Romanian 2nd Army, threatening the 9th Army's flank. Popovici relied on the mountains to protect his flanks. However, reconnaissance by the German Alpine Corps revealed that it was possible to bypass his western flank, on foot, through the mountains, then reach and cut off the Romanian line of retreat. This made Popovici's corps the most tempting target, and von Falkenhayn stressed as much: all else was secondary to striking a decisive blow at Nagyszeben.

=== Units involved (forces and deployments) ===
On the Romanian side, General Popovici had two divisions at Nagyszeben: the 23rd Division to the south and west of the highway running from Nagyszeben to the Red Tower Pass and the 13th Division to the east of this highway. The 23rd was commanded by General Matei Castriș and the 13th by General Ioan Oprescu. The two divisions formed the I Corps, headquartered at Nagytalmács since 16 September. The Romanian divisions occupied a line of 25 miles, a large distance even by Eastern Front standards. General Popovici kept his units in the forward trenches, meaning that - given the length of the front - there were no reserves and no depth. General Culcer - Popovici's superior as overall commander of the Romanian 1st Army - was aware of these issues, but his attempts to get Popovici to shorten his lines and form a reserve were unsuccessful. The Romanian front extended east and west, with Sellenberk (Șelimbăr/Schellenberg) for its center. To the east, the extreme right wing of the Romanian lines reached Porumbák (Porumbacu/Bornbach), in the valley of the Olt River. To the west, the Romanian front extended to the Szecsel (Săcel/Schwarzwasser) - Orlát (Orlat/Winsberg) - Popláka (Poplaca/Gunzendorf) line. A gap of 15 miles intervened between the extreme right of this front (Porumbák) and the vanguard of the Romanian 2nd Army, west of Fogaras (Făgăraș/Fogarasch). The left wing of this Romanian group had no connection either to the west or to the south. The two wings extended like the branches of a tree, their trunk being the road and railway going through the Red Tower Pass. Over 10 miles of tall mountains separated this Romanian front from the Romanian border. The Romanians were supplied by only one railway line, while von Falkenhayn had three supply lines. Prisoners had revealed to Culcer on the 24th that two German regiments had entered the mountains. Culcer passed this information on to Popovici, adding that it was confirmed by two other reports. In response to these reports, Popovici sent two battalions into the mountains: one battalion and some guns for the protection of the Red Tower Pass and another battalion was dispatched to protect the regions west of the pass.

The German XXXIX Corps, under General Hermann von Staabs, comprised the 187th Prussian Division (General Edwin Sunkel), the 51st Honvéd Division (General Béla Tanárky) and the 76th Prussian Reserve Division (General Hugo Elster von Elstermann). When the battle began at dawn on 26 September, Von Staabs had his divisions arrayed with the 76th Reserve Division on the east flank, the 51st Honvéd in the center and the 187th Division to the west. The cavalry group under General Eberhard Graf von Schmettow comprised the 1st Austro-Hungarian and 3rd German Cavalry Divisions. Both units were under the direct command of von Schmettow, initially the commander of only the 3rd Division. General Krafft's Alpine Corps comprised the Jäger Brigade (Brigadier General Ludwig Ritter von Tutschek) and the Bavarian Guard Regiment (Colonel Franz Ritter von Epp).

Both the Central Powers and the Romanians would receive reinforcements during the battle. On 26 September, Lieutenant-Colonel Toma Popescu, a staff officer carrying messages from the 1st Army to Popovici, arrived south of the Red Tower Pass and created a makeshift force which he used against the Alpine Corps. Von Falkenhayn received the 89th Prussian Division (General Friedrich Freiherr von Lüttwitz) on 27 September. The Romanian 1st Army received the 20th Division (General David Praporgescu) also on 27 September. On 25 September, General Culcer began moving north by rail from the western Danube half of the 20th Division. On 28 September, the Romanian 2nd Army - 3 divisions strong - attacked the flank of the German 9th Army in an attempt to relieve the besieged Popovici. In its drive against von Schmettow's forces, the 2nd Army also fought against the Austro-Hungarian 71st Division (General Anton Golbach) - itself part of Curt von Morgen's I Reserve Corps - thus bringing into the fray the army which this division was a part of - the 1st Austro-Hungarian Army of General Arthur Arz von Straußenburg. The 4th Division of the 2nd Army (General Grigore Crăiniceanu) was the closest to Popovici's forces. The 4th Division was commanded by General Grigore Simionescu. The 3 divisions of the 2nd Army were the 3rd, the 4th and the 6th.

On the side of the Central Powers, the XXXIX Corps alone had 35 battalions, each with 500-600 men, as well as 54 artillery batteries. The Romanian I Corps had 25 battalions, each with over 800 men, as well as 16 artillery batteries (including 2 batteries of 120 mm howitzers). Of the 54 artillery batteries fielded by the Central Powers, 13 were heavy, whilst of the 16 Romanian batteries, only 2 were heavy. Part of the Central Powers artillery came from the Alpine Corps division. The terrain and absence of roads in its area of operations prevented this division from using its artillery, and as such this was sent to reinforce the XXXIX Corps. Instead, this division used two batteries of Austro-Hungarian mountain artillery, 70 mm guns of the M99 type. These could be disassembled and carried on soldiers' backs. The Alpine Corps division totaled 9 infantry battalions. During this battle, both sides - numerically speaking - were more or less equal, although the Central Powers disposed of vast superiority in artillery. The Romanians disposed of 3 reconnaissance aircraft, but only one was operational, and it failed to spot all the German forces that were assembling.

The Central Powers force that von Falkenhayn managed to assemble was not quite as large as he intended. Following his victory against the Romanians at the First Battle of Petrozsény (18-22 September), Falkenhayn pulled out most of the German forces from that sector of the front - 4 battalions out of 6 - leaving only two, along with two batteries. Although he wanted to move these two battalions to Nagyszeben as well, Sunkel told him that this was out of the question. The two battalions along with the 144th Austro-Hungarian Infantry Brigade were defeated by the successful Romanian counterattack launched on 25 September (Second Battle of Petrozsény). In response, von Falkenhayn had to send away further officers, including a general. These comprised the newly formed 301st Division, a headquarters staff without troops whose role was to provide an additional control element. This unit was led by General Johannes von Busse.

== Battle ==
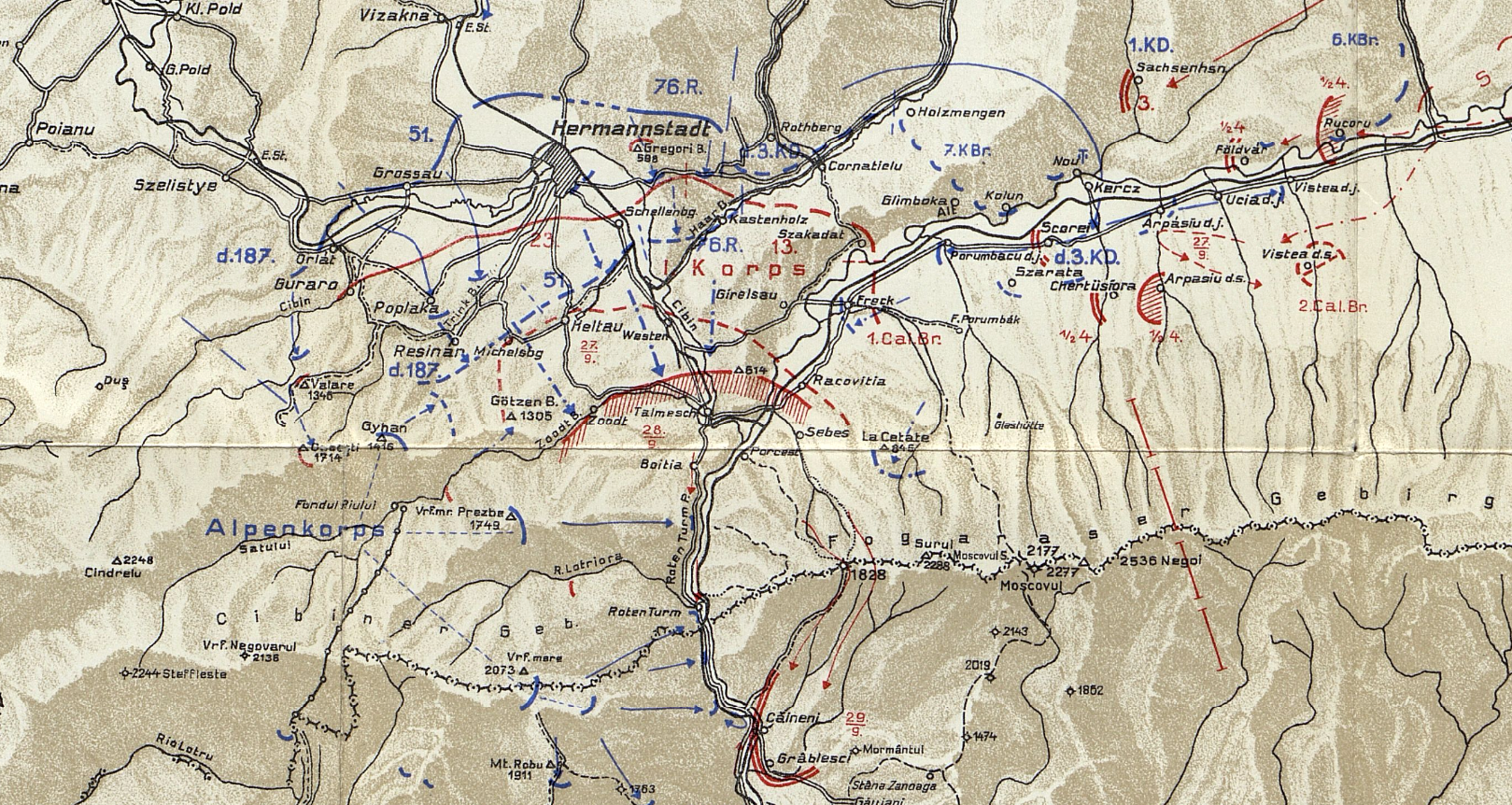
Course of the battle

=== Northern front (26-27 September) ===
The attack of the German 9th army began at dawn on the 26th. Von Staabs had his divisions deployed with the 187th to the West, the 51st Honvéd in the center and the 76th Reserve Division to the east. In clear weather, the XXXIX Corps got off to a slow start, meeting determined resistance. The Romanians, by then aware of their critical position, had commenced a general retreat to the southeast. Strong rearguards were covering this movement. The 187th Division ran almost immediately into strongly held positions. The villages of Szecsel, Orlát, Popláka and Guraró (Gura Râului/Auendorf) had to be captured one by one, swaying battles being fought in their streets. Guraró and Popláka in particular were noted by Falkenhayn for their resistance. Although the villages were captured during the evening, the Romanians remained in their strong positions on the Cioara, Valare and Obreju heights. The 51st Honvéd Division did not advance as it was expecting the 187th Division to prepare the way. The 76th Reserve Division did not actually make it into the battle, being held up by the rough terrain east of Nagyszeben.

The slow start of the Central Powers on the 26th was due to more than Romanian resistance. Von Staabs had ineffectively distributed his guns among all his units equally, meaning that no unit had the power to breach the Romanian lines. Enraged, von Falkenhayn told him to fix the problem by massing the artillery. After this was accomplished, the attack resumed on the 27th. On that day, the 9th Army continued its drive south, its reorganized artillery blasting gaps in the enemy lines. Von Falkenhayn was exasperated to end the battle, giving von Staabs the army's reserve force: the 89th Division and the 8th Landwehr Brigade. These two units were still unloading at Segesvár (Sighișoara/Schäßburg), 25 miles away, too far away to be of help. The German High Command gave von Falkenhayn control of the 89th Division on that same day, 27 September. By nightfall, the Germans had made significant gains against the Romanians. During the 27th, German and Hungarian regiments slowly made their way through Dolmány (Daia/Thalheim), Bongárd (Bungard/Baumgarten) and Hermány (Cașolț/Kastenholz), also capturing the 601 meters-tall Grigori height (the northernmost Romanian position, northeast of Nagyszeben). Not every detachment received the order to retreat while this was still possible, and the Romanians suffered considerable losses during their withdrawal from the encircled positions. On the 27th, fighting also took place at Nagydisznód (Cisnădie/Heltau), a local district capital. The Central Powers troops were surprised to find large numbers of civilians among the dead and wounded in the Romanian trenches. Many locals of Romanian descent had attempted to retreat along with the Romanian Army, but were killed in the German bombardment.

=== Southern front (26-27 September) ===
On the morning of the 26th, the Alpine Corps occupied the Red Tower Pass at several points: on the northern (Transylvanian) side at the village known by the German name of Kaiserbrunnen, and on the southern (Romanian) side at Râu Vadului and Câineni railway stations. As fighting on the northern front intensified, the Romanians became aware of the German forces in their rear and undertook some ineffective measures to drive them out. General Popovici sent his 48th Infantry Regiment from the north, but the Jägers - positioned in the hills above Kaiserbrunnen - decimated the unit with machine-gun fire. The Romanians moved to the east side of the valley, where they could pass safely, being largely out of range. Although the Germans were able to block the road traffic, they could not completely block the pass due to lacking their field artillery, left behind because of the impossibility of moving it through the mountains. Although the Germans had a few Austro-Hungarian mountain guns, these lacked the stopping power of the larger field pieces. On the southern end of the pass, the Romanians fared better. Lieutenant-Colonel Toma Popescu, a staff officer of the 1st Army carrying messages for Popovici, came across the Bavarian Guards of Prince Heinrich's III Battalion at the Câineni bridge. Immediately recognizing the threat, the Romanian officer rounded up 13 day laborers from the village and marched them to the Mayor's office. There, he found some rifles, before sending the now-armed men into the hills above the bridge. Under the leadership of a Police Sergeant and an army straggler, the Romanians put the Germans under fire, with such success that the Bavarians became confused and started searching the east side of the pass. With the Germans distracted by this fruitless task, Popescu headed south and came across a Romanian Jäger battalion with two howitzers at Brezoiu. Dividing this force into two columns, he sent one north to Câineni and the other west to fall on the Bavarians from the rear. Popescu's attack succeeded, Prince Heinrich's men abandoning the bridge and town as night fell. For the moment, the Romanians were able to prevent the Germans from becoming established.

On 27 September, the Romanians realized the seriousness of the situation when reinforcements were unable to get through the pass. Popovici sent 5 battalions south and managed to drive the Alpine Corps Jägers from the northern part of the defile and out of most of Râu Vadului as well. But the Germans still remained in the center area, jamming up Romanian convoys in bloody engagements. At the southern end, Prince Heinrich's III Battalion had reoccupied Câineni and Lunci Point. All day long, battalions from the Romanian 20th Division attacked from the south, trading possession of the disputed bridges with the Germans throughout the day. Traffic came to a halt as the Romanians waited for the cover of darkness, when they could move units with greater safety. On the 27th, 37 men from an advanced section of the 9th Company of the Bavarian Guard Regiment were captured by the Romanians at Râu Vadului. The Romanians robbed and mistreated them, avowedly in revenge for the heavy losses that they had suffered in the preceding fighting. During the morning of the next day, the Romanians led them to a nearby riverbed, where they were fired upon by a unit commanded by an elderly officer. Ten of them were killed immediately, twelve more were seriously wounded. Nearby Jägers, seeing what happened, recklessly attacked. The sudden intervention of German machine-gun fire prevented the massacre of all defenseless prisoners, driving off the Romanians in panic. Supposedly, the executions were authorized by General David Praporgescu (20th Division commander). The Germans spread word about this atrocity, and it became known even in Bucharest. As a result, anger ran high among 9th Army units, who subsequently had little desire to take prisoners.

=== Romanian retreat (28-29 September) ===
The critical day of the battle had arrived. The morning of the 28th started off well for the Central Powers. The situation continued to deteriorate for Popovici, when the XXXIX Corps started making progress against the main Romanian positions, driving his beleaguered battalions back into the mouth of the Red Tower Pass. Although driven out of its main line of defenses, Popovici's force remained unbroken. The 187th Division advanced steadily. Flanking units also pressed forward as Romanian resistance diminished. The German forces in the Red Tower Pass were involved in heavy fighting everywhere, and the danger of them being wiped out was high. There were multiple signs of a partial Romanian collapse: wrecked guns and vehicles, corpses and dead animals. However, although there was no longer determined resistance, the haul of prisoners remained very small. The main Romanian group remained intact, still disposing of substantial forces despite being clear that it had suffered very heavy losses. As von Falkenhayn himself noted: "Seldom in my life, which had not lacked dramatic moments, had I awaited the outcome with such suspense as on the morning of 29 September.". Romanian morale plummeted as exaggerated rumors about the situation in the pass reached the front line troops. Exaggerated accounts of German bombing of railway stations and staff headquarters served to further demoralize the Romanians. At 7 p.m., Popovici met with the commander of the 23rd Division - General Castriș - who reported that his forces had retreated to their last defensive line. By then, contact with most units was lost, including the 13th Division. Disheartened by the incessant German shelling and believing that no help would reach him, Popovici decided to save what was possible by retreating south down the pass. He formed his units into 3 columns, with a center of supply wagons, ambulances, artillery pieces, livestock and trains, with the infantry on the outside. The 44th Infantry Regiment comprised the vanguard. The 23rd Division was ordered to hold the enemy to the north for as long as possible, the same orders being conveyed to the 13th Division by Popovici's Chief of Staff. Around 10:30 pm, with Popovici in the lead, the column headed south.

Popovici had given the strictest orders for silence, but once the Alpine Corps spotted the Romanians and put them under fire, his panicked soldiers shouted and cursed at their animals, which bolted. Military police and gendarmes were unable to keep order. In this chaos, infantry columns stopped and waited for hours, while wagon columns galloped south at full speed. At Vöröstorony (Turnu Roșu/Rothenturm), artillery had to be used to blast away a barricade of dead horses and wagons assembled by the Germans. "The cries of the wounded, the machine-gun and rifle fire, the bellowing of the animals and the roaring waters of the Olt all echoed in the narrow passage, adding to the hellishness of the scene.". At 5:30 a.m., the wagon column was halted by machine-gun fire coming from the Lunci Point railway station. The vanguard regiment and two artillery batteries did not succeed in dislodging the Germans. The Romanians offered cash prizes to clear the Germans. After an hour, and only after the Romanians assaulted the buildings and bayoneted to death everyone inside, did the shooting cease. The Romanian column resumed its march south. At 2:30 p.m. on the 29th, Popovici's column staggered out of the pass and into Câineni and safety. For the Romanian infantry, it was a question of infiltrating back by various border paths across the Făgăraș Mountains, east of the Olt River.

=== Relief attempt by the Romanian 2nd Army (28-29 September) ===
As the I Corps remained almost under siege, the leaders of the Romanian Army were compelled to attempt its relief. The 2nd Army - 3 divisions strong at the time - attacked on 28 and 29 September, driving against the flank of the German 9th Army among skillfully retreating German and Austro-Hungarian forces. During the early morning of the 28th, von Schmettow reported that the Romanians had driven a wedge between his 6th Austro-Hungarian Cavalry Brigade and the 71st Austro-Hungarian Division of the Austro-Hungarian 1st Army. A gap a dozen miles wide was opened and the entire 9th Army was exposed to a flank attack. The 89th Division - von Falkenhayn's last reserve - was coming south from Segesvár and began to march into the area between the two armies, but Falkenhayn feared that the Romanians would overwhelm it. Pressure on the extreme western flank of the Austro-Hungarian 1st Army drove back a weak Hungarian cavalry detachment and the battered 71st Division. Falkenhayn was alarmed to receive a message from the usually aggressive Curt von Morgen - whose I Reserve Corps commanded this flank of Arz's 1st Army - that he viewed a further retreat as almost inevitable. The actions of the Romanian 2nd Army contributed to von Falkenhayn's troubled night's sleep that evening. On the 29th, as the battle came to a conclusion, the 2nd Army's 3rd Division drove the 2nd Honvéd Cavalry Division back north across the Hortobágy (Hârtibaciu/Haar) Creek. This drive threatened what had become the juncture of the two Central Powers armies. The 2nd Romanian Army executed its movements slowly and with difficulty. An advance along the shortest line in the Olt Valley might have been easily threatened, so the Romanians felt themselves compelled to ensure freedom of movement north of the Olt River. Therefore, the forward sections of the 71st Infantry Division were the first to be pressed back. Then, the 6th Cavalry Brigade of the 1st Cavalry Division - standing north of Kissink (Cincșor/Kleinschenk) - was thrown back westwards. Pushing between the 71st Division and the Cavalry Corps, the 89th Division carried out on 28 September a successful attack to the south, temporarily halting the advance of the Romanian troops north of the Olt. However, the Romanians resumed their offensive during the afternoon of that same day, attacking the 1st Cavalry Division north of the Olt and pressing it back to the heights east of the Hortobágy. The German reserve, not required at Nagyszeben, was swiftly deployed with heavy motor wagons through the Hortobágy Valley to the aid of the heavily engaged Schmettow Cavalry Corps. On the 29th, the Romanians pushed rapidly and violently in the space between the Hortobágy and the Olt. To the surprise of the Central Powers, the Romanians did not continue the attack north of the Olt on 30 September. During its advance on the 28th, the Romanian 2nd Army gained several settlements, most notably the village of Nagysink (Cincu/Großschenk), a district (járás) capital within the Nagy-Küküllő County. Ultimately, the 2nd Army forced its way as far as Porumbák, but by that time the Romanian detachment - which had stood there on the extreme right wing of Popovici's Corps - had been forced to retreat to the east, and the German forces continued to separate the two armies. The 4th Division of the 2nd Army advanced to within 7 miles of Popovici's right flank.

== Aftermath ==
=== Losses ===
Relief from his command and disgrace awaited Popovici. Nevertheless, his retreat did manage to save the soldiers under his command. The Central Powers captured from the Romanian 1st Army 13 guns, 6 machine-guns, 2 aircraft (out of 3) and 3,000 prisoners. Other losses included 10 locomotives with 700 loaded railway wagons (300 of small arms ammunition, 200 of artillery munitions and 200 filled with baggage), 70 cars and trucks, a hospital train and a paymaster's supplies. Out of 16 Romanian artillery batteries, 13 guns were captured. Thus, "by some miracle", almost the entire artillery of the Romanian corps was saved. The loss of the 6 machine-guns captured by the Central Powers was more than made up for by Culcer's almost simultaneous offensive further west, during which the Romanians captured 7 machine-guns. The ground losses of the Romanian 2nd Army are unknown, but it did lose one aircraft along with its pilot. This pilot had been given a message for Popovici, but he landed behind German lines and was taken prisoner on 29 September.

The losses of the Central Powers are mostly unknown. However, during their retreat to Câineni, the Romanians did succeed in capturing 300 prisoners.

=== Analysis ===
In spite of the heroic efforts of the Alpine Corps in the Red Tower Pass, the bulk of the Romanian force had escaped. The infantry discovered that they could stay outside the effective range of German machine-guns by pressing along the east side of the pass. The wagon column was restricted to the road, thus taking the brunt of the losses. The Romanians escaped complete destruction by abandoning any attempt to recover the Red Tower Pass, instead marching southeastwards across the Fogaras Mountains, thus turning the pass. Due to a lack of good roads, Falkenhayn had judged such a maneuver impossible. The strenuous efforts of fresh Romanian forces to clear the Red Tower Pass from the south did not succeed in freeing that highway, though they did much to ensure the Romanian retreat to the southeast. The German force in the mountains was too weak for its task. It was not strong enough at the beginning of the battle, let alone after the Romanians had been reinforced. It was probably impossible to throw stronger forces against the Red Tower Pass, a decisive victory being therefore beyond Falkenhayn's powers. He was thus unable to reap all the benefits from his successful surprise. Although the Romanian I Corps was thoroughly beaten in this battle, the German forces which operated against its rear were too weak to achieve its annihilation. In consequence, the Romanian troops which defeated the first Central Powers offensive south of the Red Tower Pass in late October were those beaten at Nagyszeben in September. Although this victory was not decisive in the sense intended by von Falkenhayn, it was still decisive in that it compelled the Romanian abandonment of Transylvania. As early as 2 October, impressed by the defeat at Nagyszeben, the Romanians had abandoned the idea of continuing the offensive.

=== Quotes about the battle ===
Erich Ludendorff, First Quartermaster General of the German General Staff:

The Hermannstadt blow succeeded. By 26 September the Alpine Corps, in a long flanking march, had pushed forward to the Rotenturm Pass in the rear of the enemy, whereupon the main body of the Ninth Army attacked on both sides of Hermannstadt. Our force was weak, and the battle lasted until the 30th. The Rumanians offered an obstinate resistance, and also attacked the Alpine Corps from the south. However, the Rumanian main forces moved too late, and could not prevent the complete overthrow of a part of their army at Hermannstadt.

John Buchan, historian:

The retiring troops lost heavily, but the amazing thing is that their losses were not greater. The Germans claimed no more than 3,000 prisoners and thirteen guns, and the main booty was laden wagons and rolling-stock intercepted on the Hermannstadt railway. It was faulty generalship which led to the surprise of 26th September, but both leaders and men showed at their best in their efforts to retrieve the disaster. Hermannstadt was an undeniable defeat, but it was never a rout, and the retreat over the range will rank as one of the most honourable achievements in the story of Rumanian arms. But Falkenhayn had won his end. He was now free to turn eastward against the flank of the Second Army.

== Misconceptions ==
Some sources erroneously identify the Romanian general commanding the two divisions at Nagyszeben as Manolescu. Originally, Popovici's I Corps comprised four divisions instead of two, and it had responsibility for operations in both the Jiu and the Olt valleys. Given the distances involved, this was problematic. Thus, several days into the campaign, General Culcer decided to make the two divisions at the Olt a de facto corps headquarters, with General Constantin Manolescu in charge. In mid-September, Culcer moved the I Corps headquarters to Nagytalmács to assume command of the two divisions located there. Popovici and his staff arrived in Nagytalmács on 16 September. After a tour of the front with Popovici, the distraught General Manolescu announced that his nerves had failed him and he left for Romania. Thus, while a general named Manolescu did command the two Romanian divisions at Nagyszeben, he had been replaced for over a week by Popovici by the time the battle started.

Some sources may erroneously refer to the Central Powers attempt at annihilating the Romanian forces north of the Red Tower Pass as a success. The Encyclopædia Britannica, for instance, states that the Romanian defeat became a "complete collapse", that it was an "annihilating defeat", that the bulk of the Romanian 1st Army was destroyed. While this source does acknowledge the "relatively small number" of 3,000 prisoners, it wrongly states that the whole of the artillery was also captured. Most sources state otherwise: the bulk of the Romanian forces escaped and almost the entire artillery of the Romanian corps was saved. The core Romanian losses of 3,000 prisoners and 13 guns captured are almost universally agreed upon among the sources.

Some sources state that the battle began on 27 September. The attack of the 9th Army began at dawn on the 26th.
