= Simionescu =

Simionescu is a Romanian-language surname. Notable people with the surname include:

- Adrian Simionescu, Romanian vocalist
- Grigore Simionescu, Romanian general
- Ion Th. Simionescu, Romanian geologist
- Mariana Simionescu, Romanian tennis player
- Nicolae Simionescu, Romanian physician
- Vlăduț Simionescu, Romanian judoka

== See also ==
- Dan Simonescu, also known as Simionescu
- Simionești (disambiguation)
