= Princess Theresa of Liechtenstein =

Princess Theresa
- Princess Arnulf of Bavaria
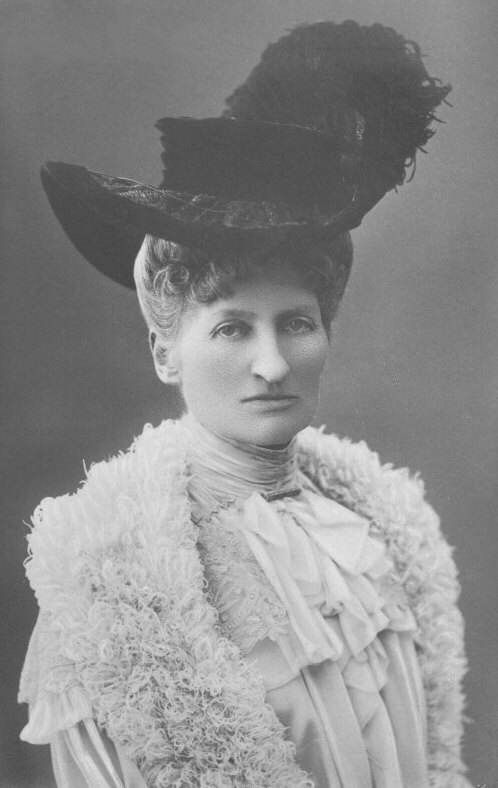
- Born: 28 July 1850; Schloss Liechtenstein
- Died: 13 March 1938 (aged 87); Munich, Bavaria
- Burial: Theatinerkirche, Munich
- Spouse: Prince Arnulf of Bavaria (m. 1882; died 1907)
- Issue: Prince Heinrich of Bavaria
Names
- German: Therese Maria Josepha Martha
- House: Liechtenstein
- Father: Aloys II, Prince of Liechtenstein
- Mother: Franziska Kinsky von Wchinitz und Tettau

Theresa Maria Josepha Martha (28 July 1850, Schloss Liechtenstein – 13 March 1938, Munich) was a Princess of Liechtenstein and of Bavaria.

== Family ==
Theresa was the tenth child and ninth daughter of Aloys II, Prince of Liechtenstein and his wife, Countess Franziska Kinsky of Wchinitz and Tettau. She was a younger sister of Johann II, Prince of Liechtenstein and an older sister of Franz I, Prince of Liechtenstein.

== Marriage ==
On 12 April 1882, in Vienna, Theresa married Prince Arnulf of Bavaria, youngest son of Luitpold, Prince Regent of Bavaria and Archduchess Auguste Ferdinande of Austria. They had one child, Prince Heinrich of Bavaria (1884–1916), who died in the First World War. She is buried in the Theatinerkirche in Munich.

== Ancestry ==
Ancestors of Princess Theresa of Liechtenstein

8. Franz Josef I, Prince of Liechtenstein
4. Johann I Josef, Prince of Liechtenstein
9. Countess Leopoldine of Sternberg
2. Alois II, Prince of Liechtenstein
10. Joachim Egon, Landgrave of Fürstenberg-Weitra
5. Landgravine Josepha of Furstenberg-Weitra
11. Countess Sophia Maria of Oettingen-Wallerstein
1. Princess Theresa of Liechtenstein
12. Joseph, Prince Kinsky of Wchinitz and Tettau
6. Count Franz de Paula Kinsky of Wchinitz and Tettau
13. Countess Rosa of Harrach-Rohrau and Thannhausen
3. Countess Franziska Kinsky of Wchinitz and Tettau
14. Count Rudolf of Wrbna and Freudenthal
7. Countess Therese of Wrbna and Freudenthal
15. Countess Maria Theresia of Kaunitz-Rietberg
