= Luitpold, Prince Regent of Bavaria =

Regent of Bavaria from 1886 to 1912

Prince Luitpold
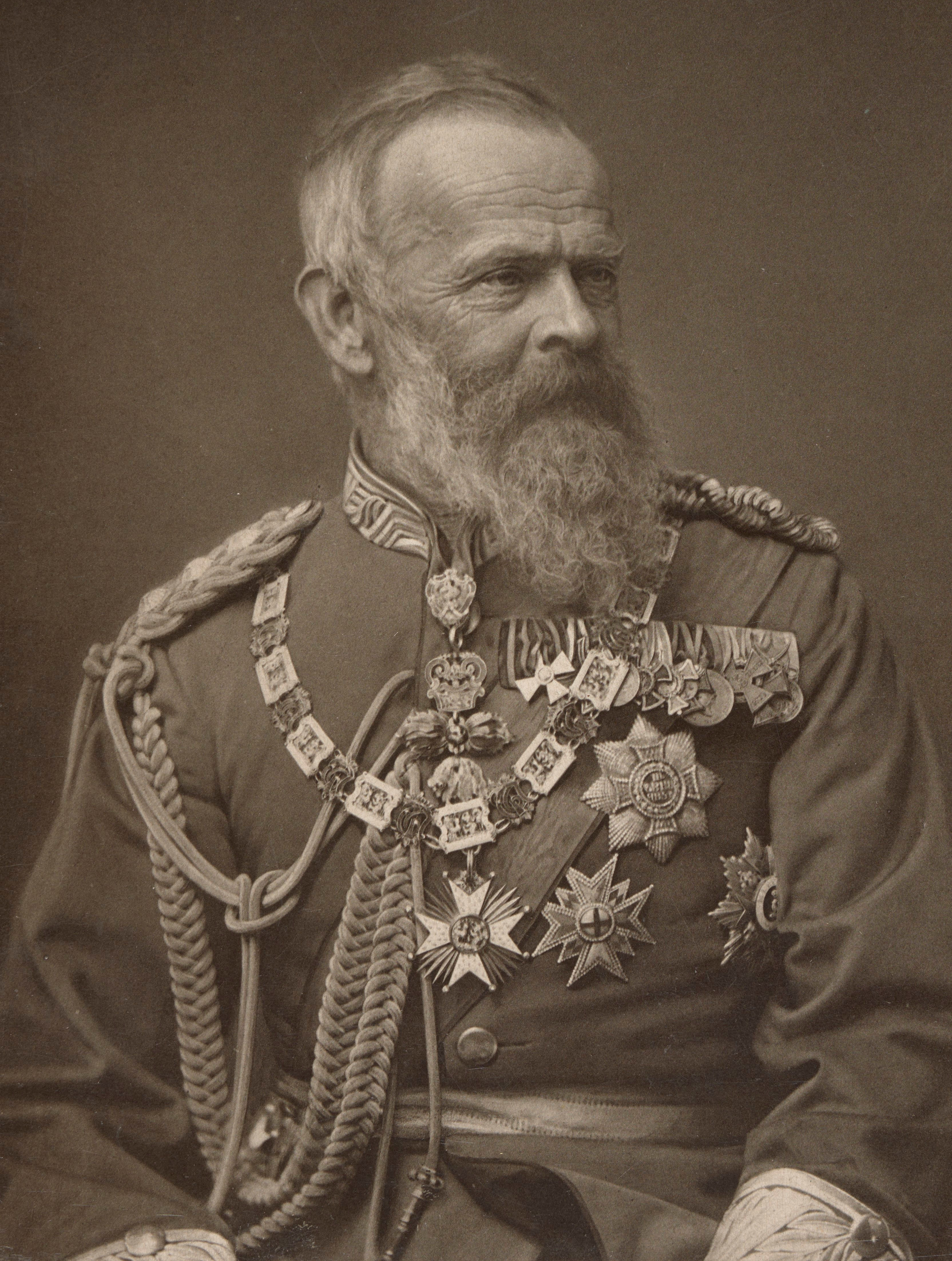
- The Prince Regent in 1888

Prince Regent of Bavaria
- Regency: 10 June 1886 – 12 December 1912
- Successor: Prince Ludwig
- Monarchs: Ludwig II; Otto
- Born: 12 March 1821; Würzburg, Bavaria, German Confederation
- Died: 12 December 1912 (aged 91); Munich, Bavaria, German Empire
- Burial: Theatinerkirche, Munich, Bavaria
- Spouse: Archduchess Auguste Ferdinande of Austria (m. 1844; died 1864)
- Issue: Ludwig III; Prince Leopold; Princess Theresa; Prince Arnulf
Names
- German: Luitpold Karl Joseph Wilhelm Ludwig; Leopold Charles Joseph William Louis
- House: Wittelsbach
- Father: Ludwig I of Bavaria
- Mother: Therese of Saxe-Hildburghausen

Luitpold Karl Joseph Wilhelm Ludwig, Prince Regent of Bavaria (German: Luitpold Karl Joseph Wilhelm Prinzregent von Bayern; 12 March 1821 – 12 December 1912), was the de facto ruler of Bavaria from 1886 to 1912, as regent for his nephews, King Ludwig II and King Otto. His regency arose due to his nephews' mental incapacity.

== Early life ==
Luitpold was born at the Residence in Würzburg, the third son of King Ludwig I of Bavaria and his wife, Therese of Saxe-Hildburghausen. He was the younger brother of King Maximilian II of Bavaria and of King Otto of Greece. Luitpold was in line to succeed to the throne of the Kingdom of Bavaria, and was also heir presumptive to the throne of Greece, since his brother Otto had no children. However, the Greek constitution required that Otto's heir should belong to the Greek Orthodox Church. Otto was deposed in 1862 and replaced by Prince William of Denmark, who became George I, King of the Hellenes. Otto died in 1867, leaving Luitpold and his descendants as representatives of Otto's claim. However, Luitpold never pursued that claim.

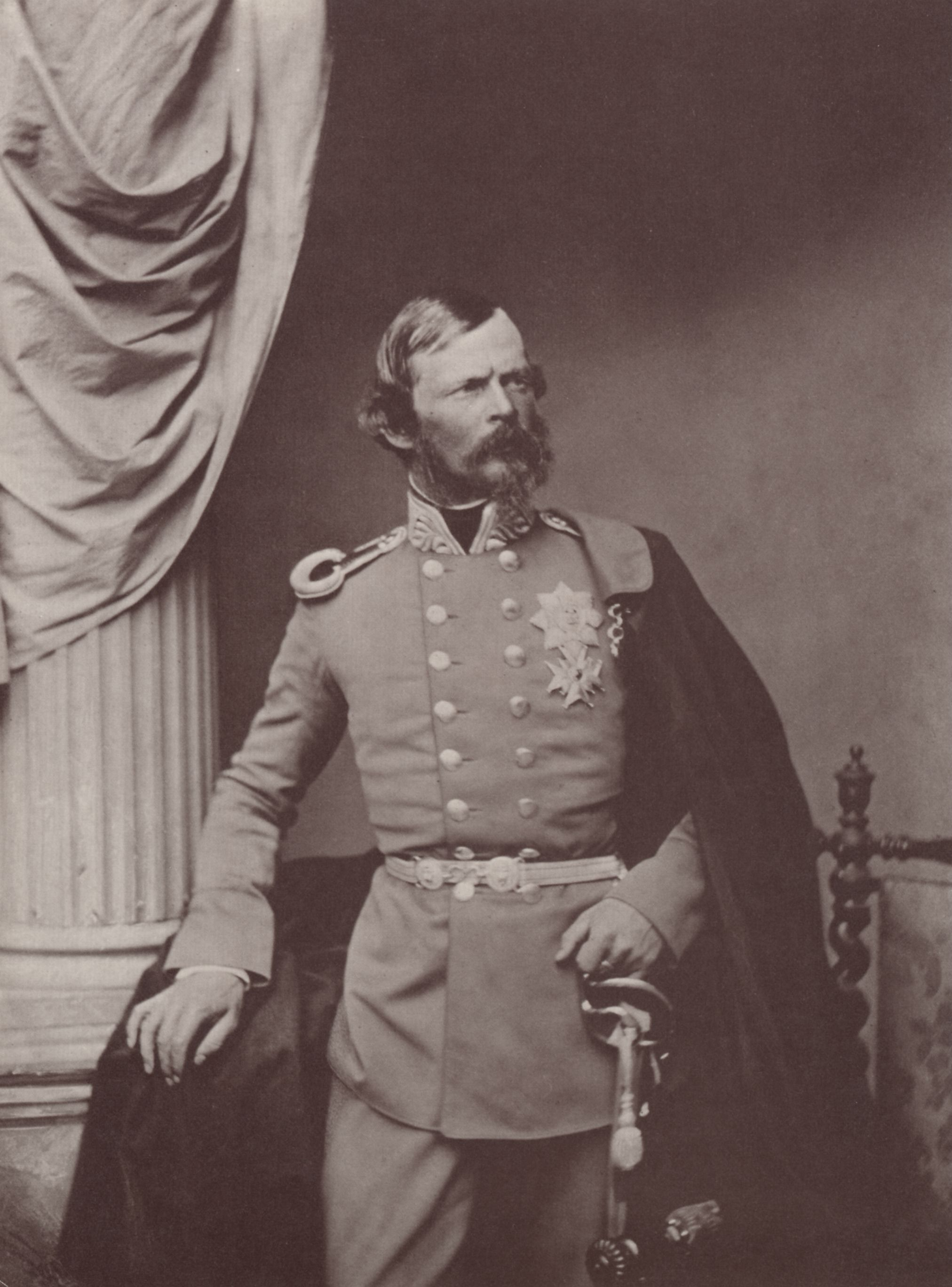
Prince Luitpold of Bavaria

At the age of fourteen, Luitpold joined the Bavarian Army and was promoted to captain of the artillery in 1835. During the revolutions of 1848, Prince Luitpold mediated and facilitated an audience of discontented citizens with his father. During the rule of his brother Maximilian II (1848–64), Luitpold did not play a significant political role.

With the reign of his nephew Ludwig II (1864–1886), Prince Luitpold had to (increasingly) represent the royal house due to the King's long absence from the capital. In the Austro-Prussian War in 1866 Luitpold was commander of the 3rd Royal Bavarian Division. After the war, he participated in the reorganization of the Bavarian Army. In 1869, he became Inspector General of the Bavarian Army, during the Franco-Prussian War in 1870 and 1871, he represented Bavaria in the German General Staff. In that capacity, he handed over Ludwig's Kaiserbrief on 3 December 1870, in which Ludwig endorsed the creation of the German Empire with the King of Prussia, Wilhelm I, as German Emperor.

Since Ludwig, who nonetheless regretted Bavaria's loss of independence, refused to attend Wilhelm's 18 January proclamation as Emperor in the Palace of Versailles, Ludwig's brother, Prince Otto, and his uncle Luitpold represented him in the Palace of Versailles. Otto then criticized the celebration as ostentatious and heartless in a letter to his brother. In 1876, Luitpold was appointed Field Marshal.

== Regency ==
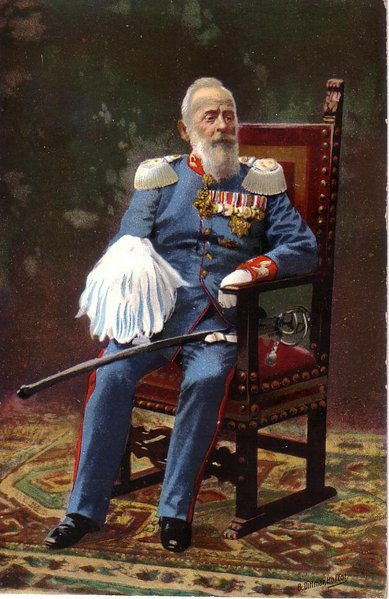
Prince Regent Luitpold celebrating his 90th birthday in 1911

On 10 June 1886, Luitpold's nephew King Ludwig II was declared mentally incompetent and Luitpold was named Regent. Luitpold's part is still controversial. Following Ludwig II's mysterious death a few days later, his brother Otto assumed the throne. However, Otto was likewise (or more so) mentally incapable of reigning; he had been under medical supervision since 1883. Accordingly, Luitpold continued to serve as regent. Prince Luitpold was even accused by some people of the murder of his nephew, but soon the decent and affable prince became one of Bavaria's most popular rulers. One of his first actions (on 1 August 1886) was to open several of the palaces of Ludwig II to the public.

Politically, Luitpold remained largely passive. His governments gradually moved away from the previous anti-Catholic Kulturkampf policies. This development culminated in 1912 when the appointment of the Centre Party politician Georg von Hertling as minister president; this also effectively brought about a parliamentarisation of the government, as Hertling's Centre Party was the largest group in the Landtag.

It had long been speculated that Ludwig and Otto's diagnoses of mental incapacity were pretexts to shunt them aside, given that they were rather cool toward Prussia while Luitpold was thought to be pro-Prussian. However, during Luitpold's regency, relations between Munich and Berlin remained cold as Bavarians resented Prussia's strategic dominance over the empire.

Luitpold continued to serve as regent until 1912, when he contracted bronchitis and died in Munich. He is buried in the crypt of the Theatinerkirche in Munich. He was succeeded by his eldest son, Prince Ludwig, who remained as regent for another year. In 1913, the constitution was amended to add a clause stating that if a regency for reasons of incapacity had lasted for at least 10 years with no prospect of the king being able to actively reign, the regent could assume the throne in his own right. Soon after this amendment was promulgated, Ludwig ended the regency, deposed Otto and assumed the throne as Ludwig III.

The Prinzregentenzeit ("The Prince Regent's time"), as the regency of Luitpold is often called, marked the gradual transfer of Bavarian interests behind those of the German Empire. In connection with the unhappy end of the preceding rule of King Ludwig II, this break in the Bavarian monarchy looked even stronger. Finally, the constitutional amendment of 1913 brought the determining break in the continuity of the king's rule in the opinion of historians, particularly as this change had been granted by the Landtag as a House of Representatives and meant therefore indirectly the first step toward parliamentary rule in Bavaria. Today the connection of these two developments is regarded as a main cause for the unspectacular end of the Bavarian kingdom without opposition in the course of the November revolution of 1918. However, during the course of his 26-year regency Luitpold grew to overcome, by modesty, ability and popularity, the initial uneasiness of his subjects. These prince regent's years were transfigured, finally – above all in the retrospect – to a golden age of Bavaria, even if one mourned the "fairy tale king" Ludwig II in a folkloric-nostalgic manner to this day.

== Legacy ==
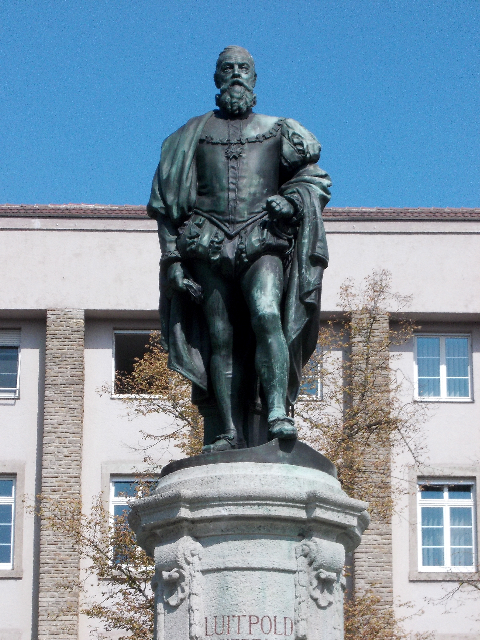
Augsburg monument by the sculptor Franz Bernauer on top of the fountain Prinzregentenbrunnen.

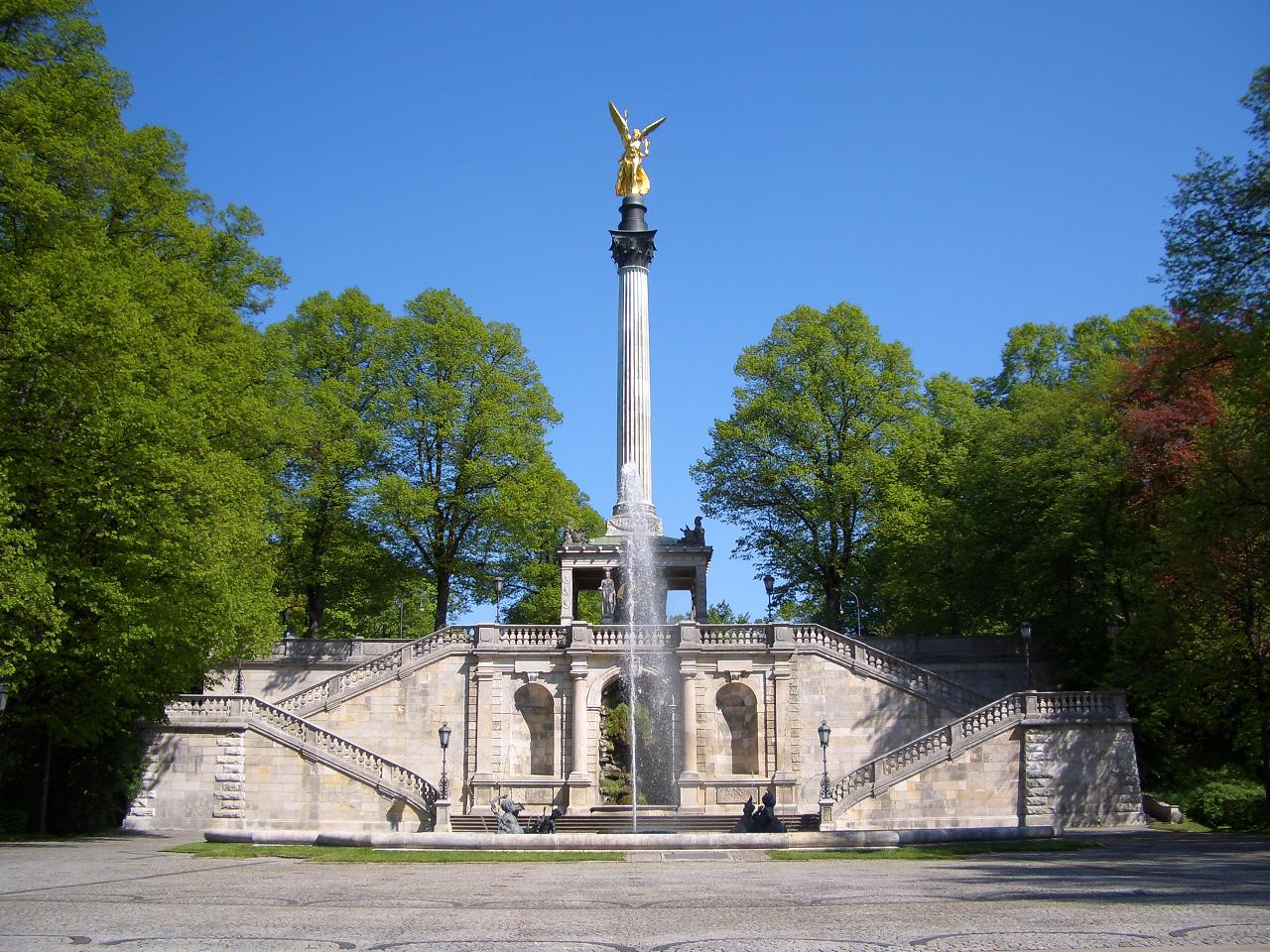
Angel of Peace in the Prinzregentenstraße in Munich, erected as antipole to the Berlin Victory Column

Tutored as a child by Domenico Quaglio the Younger, Luitpold had a great feeling for the arts. Luitpold's years as regent were marked by tremendous artistic and cultural activity in Bavaria where they are known as the Prinzregentenjahre ("The Prince Regent years") or the Prinzregentenzeit. Bavaria prospered under a liberal government and Munich became a cultural centre of Europe. Thomas Mann wrote about this period "Munich shone" (1902 Gladius Dei). Schwabing became an important artists' quarter in Munich.

There are numerous streets in Bavarian cities and towns called Prinzregentenstrasse or Luitpoldstrasse. Many institutions are named in Luitpold's honour including the Prinzregententheater in Munich and the Luitpoldarena and the Luitpoldhalle in Nürnberg. In 1891 Luitpold established the Luitpold Gymnasium in Munich. Prinzregententorte is a multi-layered cake with chocolate butter cream named in his honour. The vessel SMS Prinzregent Luitpold of the Imperial German Navy and the Luitpold Coast were named for Luitpold.

Luitpold's great passion next to the arts was hunting, and his legendary hunts took place throughout Bavaria.

== Family ==
The Prince Regent with his son Ludwig, his grandson Rupprecht and his great-grandson Luitpold in the park of Nymphenburg Palace

On 1 April 1844, in Florence, Luitpold married Archduchess Auguste Ferdinande of Austria, Princess of Tuscany, second daughter of Leopold II, Grand Duke of Tuscany. Luitpold and Auguste had four children:

- Ludwig III of Bavaria (1845–1921). Married Archduchess Maria Theresa of Austria-Este; had issue.
- Prince Leopold Maximilian Joseph Maria Arnulf of Bavaria (1846–1930). Married Archduchess Gisela of Austria; had issue.
- Princess Therese Charlotte Marianne Auguste of Bavaria (1850–1925)
- Prince Franz Joseph Arnulf Adalbert Maria of Bavaria (1852–1907). Married Princess Theresa of Liechtenstein and had a son, Heinrich Luitpold (1884–1916), killed in action during World War I.

== Honours ==
Greater Royal Coat of Arms of Luitpold, Prince Regent of Bavaria

He received the following orders and decorations:

- Kingdom of Bavaria:
  - Knight of St. Hubert
  - Grand Prior of Upper Bavaria of the Royal Bavarian House Equestrian Order of St. George
  - Grand Cross of the Military Merit Order
- Baden:
  - Knight of the House Order of Fidelity, 1854
  - Grand Cross of the Zähringer Lion, 1854
- Brunswick: Grand Cross of the Order of Henry the Lion, 1898
- (Saxe-Coburg and Gotha) (Duchy of Saxe-Altenburg) (Saxe-Meiningen) Ernestine duchies: Grand Cross of the Saxe-Ernestine House Order, March 1839
- Kingdom of Hanover:
  - Knight of St. George, 1861
  - Grand Cross of the Royal Guelphic Order, 1861
- Electorate of Hesse: Knight of the Golden Lion, 7 August 1854
- Grand Duchy of Hesse:
  - Grand Cross of the Ludwig Order, 18 November 1849
  - Military Merit Cross, 17 June 1873
- Oldenburg: Grand Cross of the Order of Duke Peter Friedrich Ludwig, with Golden Crown, 4 November 1862
- Kingdom of Prussia:
  - Knight of the Black Eagle, 25 June 1840; with Collar, 1861
  - Grand Commander's Cross of the Royal House Order of Hohenzollern, 22 March 1877
- Saxe-Weimar-Eisenach: Grand Cross of the White Falcon, 1888
- Kingdom of Saxony: Knight of the Rue Crown, 1871
- Württemberg: Grand Cross of the Württemberg Crown, 1869
- Austrian Empire:
  - Grand Cross of the Royal Hungarian Order of St. Stephen, 1846
  - Knight of the Golden Fleece, 1849
- Belgium: Grand Cordon of the Order of Leopold, 1900 – wedding gift
- Denmark: Knight of the Elephant, 18 May 1891
- French Empire: Grand Cross of the Legion of Honour, September 1857
- Kingdom of Greece: Grand Cross of the Redeemer
- Kingdom of Italy: Knight of the Annunciation, 13 April 1883
- Empire of Japan: Grand Cordon of the Order of the Chrysanthemum, 23 July 1894
- Russian Empire:
  - Knight of St. George, 4th Class
  - Knight of St. Andrew
- Spain: Grand Cross of the Order of Charles III, 3 February 1863
- Sweden: Knight of the Seraphim, 31 May 1910
- Grand Duchy of Tuscany: Grand Cross of St. Joseph
- United Kingdom:
  - Honorary Grand Cross of the Bath (military), 19 March 1901
  - Stranger Knight Companion of the Garter, 10 March 1911

== Ancestry ==
Ancestors of Luitpold, Prince Regent of Bavaria

8. Frederick Michael, Count Palatine of Zweibrücken
4. Maximilian I Joseph of Bavaria
9. Countess Palatine Maria Franziska of Sulzbach
2. Ludwig I of Bavaria
10. Prince George William of Hesse-Darmstadt
5. Princess Augusta Wilhelmine of Hesse-Darmstadt
11. Countess Maria Louise Albertine of Leiningen-Dagsburg-Falkenburg
1. Luitpold, Prince Regent of Bavaria
12. Ernest Frederick III, Duke of Saxe-Hildburghausen
6. Frederick, Duke of Saxe-Altenburg
13. Princess Ernestine of Saxe-Weimar-Eisenach
3. Princess Therese of Saxe-Hildburghausen
14. Charles II, Grand Duke of Mecklenburg-Strelitz
7. Duchess Charlotte Georgine of Mecklenburg-Strelitz
15. Princess Friederike of Hesse-Darmstadt
