= Archduchess Auguste Ferdinande of Austria =

- Princess Luitpold of Bavaria
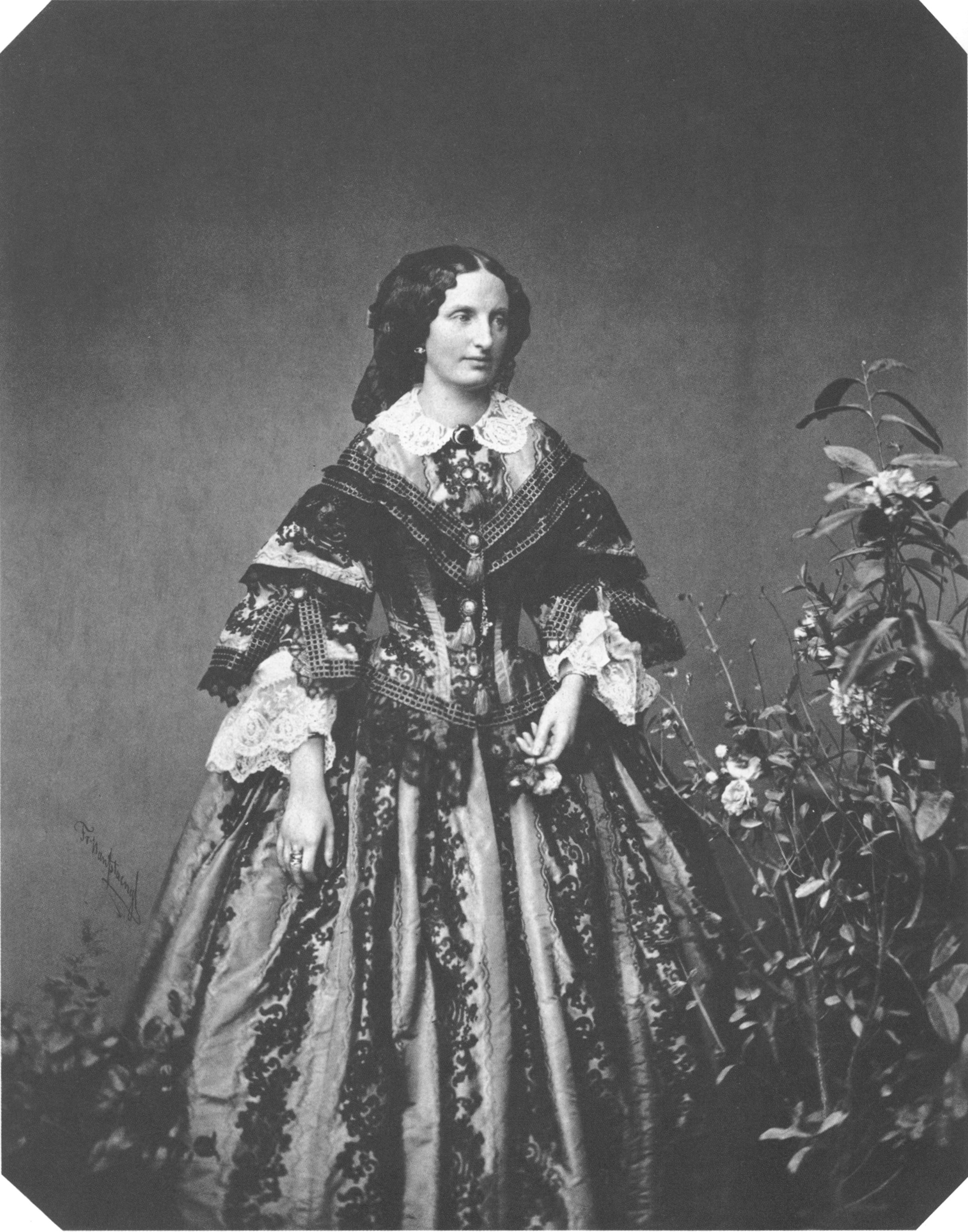
- Photograph c. 1850
- Born: 1 April 1825; Florence, Grand Duchy of Tuscany
- Died: 26 April 1864 (aged 39); Munich, Kingdom of Bavaria
- Spouse: Prince Luitpold of Bavaria (m. 1844)
- Issue: Ludwig III of Bavaria; Prince Leopold; Princess Therese; Prince Arnulf
Names
- Auguste Ferdinande Luise Maria Johanna Josepha
- House: Habsburg-Lorraine
- Father: Leopold II, Grand Duke of Tuscany
- Mother: Maria Anna of Saxony

Archduchess Auguste Ferdinande of Austria (German: Auguste Ferdinande Erzherzogin von Österreich und Prinzessin der Toskana; 1 April 1825 – 26 April 1864) was the only daughter of Leopold II, Grand Duke of Tuscany, and his first wife, Princess Maria Anna of Saxony, to survive to adulthood. She married Prince Luitpold of Bavaria, who later became the Prince Regent of Bavaria after her death.

== Family ==
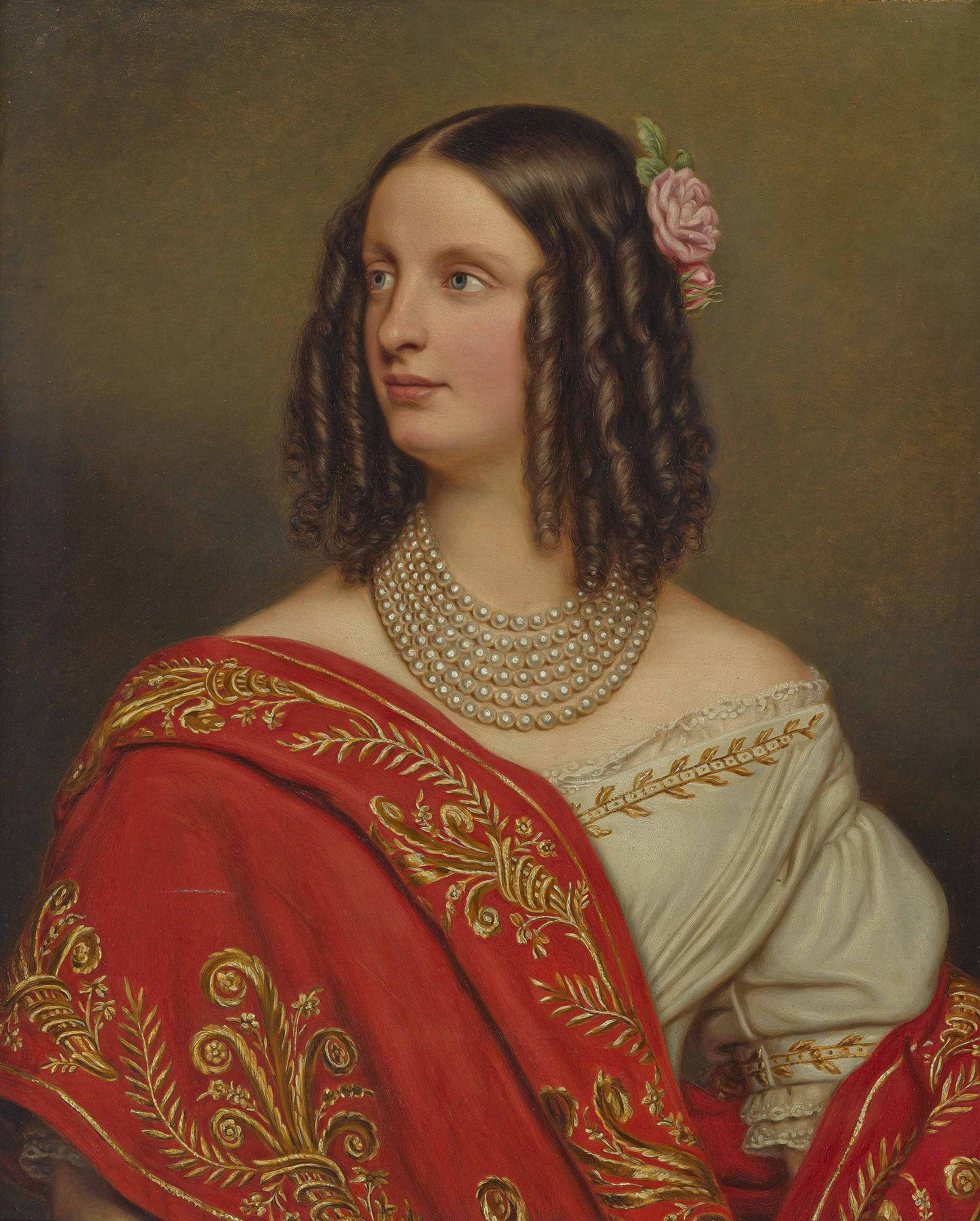
Portrait by Joseph Bernhardt, 1845

Auguste was one of three children born to Leopold II, Grand Duke of Tuscany, and his first wife, Maria Anna of Saxony. She was an older half-sister to Ferdinand IV, Grand Duke of Tuscany, among others.

== Early life ==
After a strict Catholic upbringing, she developed an interest in the arts and sciences early in life. Contemporaries described her as tall, beautiful and self-conscious. She was posthumously praised for her high qualities of mind and heart, and as a benefactress of the poor.

== Marriage ==
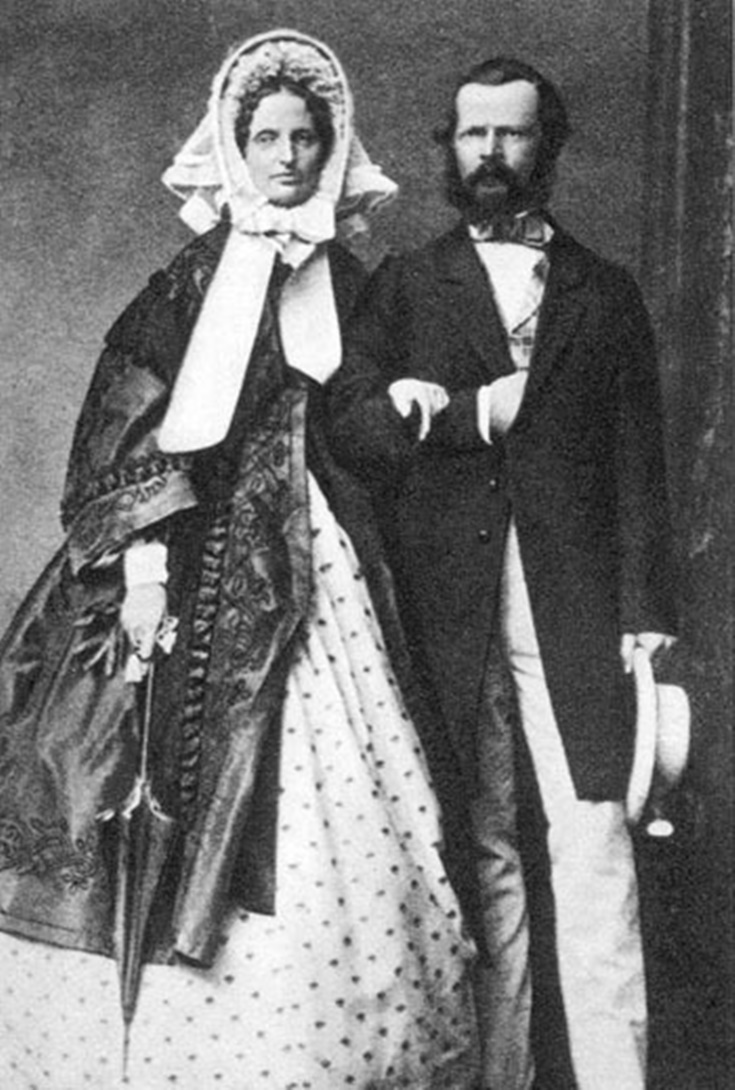
Auguste Ferdinande and her husband Luitpold, photographed in 1862

On 15 April 1844, she married Prince Luitpold in Florence. Luitpold's father King Ludwig I of Bavaria initially opposed Luitpold's marriage plans, since Auguste was already showing symptoms of pulmonary tuberculosis before the marriage (the disease of which she finally died aged only 39). Through this marriage her descendants, the royal house of Bavaria, could also claim descent from the most senior branch, extinct in the male line since 1777, of the House of Wittelsbach; the last male member of the elder branch being Elector Maximilian III Joseph Bavaria, whose death sparked the War of the Bavarian Succession. The war ended with the ascent to the throne in Munich of Charles Theodore, Elector of Bavaria, who was the head of the cadet branch of Wittelsbach-Zweibrücken, which remains until today the only extant branch. Auguste Ferdinande was descended from Duchess Maria Antonia Walpurgis of Bavaria, Electress of Saxony, who was the eldest sister of the aforementioned Maximilian III Joseph, and daughter of Charles VII, Holy Roman Emperor.

They had four children (with whom she always spoke Italian), including Ludwig III of Bavaria, and she was a great support for Luitpold in all his political activities. During the 1848 Revolution, she spoke against Lola Montez and sought to isolate opponents of the monarchy.

== Issue ==
Her children with Luitpold were:

- Ludwig III (1845–1921), King of Bavaria, married Archduchess Maria Theresia of Austria-Este (1849–1919)
- Leopold (1846–1930), married Archduchess Gisela of Austria (1856–1932)
- Therese (1850–1925)
- Arnulf (1852–1907), married Princess Therese of Liechtenstein (1850–1938)

== Death ==
During the final eight years of her life, the archduchess suffered from chest pain, for which she was treated. She also suffered from a liver condition. On her death, she was buried in the crypt of the Theatinerkirche, and her funeral had taken place in the Court Church of Saint Cajetan, on April 29 1864, twenty years to the day she had made her arrival into Munich. Luitpold never remarried, with his sister Adelgunde and daughter Therese taking over care of his household.

== Honours ==
- Kingdom of Bavaria 13 May 1851 - 26 April 1864: Grand Mistress of the Order of Saint Elisabeth
- Kingdom of Spain: Dame of the Order of Queen Maria Luisa

== Ancestry ==
Ancestors of Archduchess Auguste Ferdinande of Austria

8. Leopold II, Holy Roman Emperor
4. Ferdinand III, Grand Duke of Tuscany
9. Infanta Maria Louisa of Spain
2. Leopold II, Grand Duke of Tuscany
10. Ferdinand I of the Two Sicilies
5. Princess Luisa of Naples and Sicily
11. Archduchess Maria Carolina of Austria
1. Archduchess Auguste Ferdinande of Austria
12. Frederick Christian, Elector of Saxony
6. Maximilian, Hereditary Prince of Saxony
13. Duchess Maria Antonia of Bavaria
3. Princess Maria Anna of Saxony
14. Ferdinand, Duke of Parma
7. Princess Carolina of Parma
15. Archduchess Maria Amalia of Austria
