= Prince Heinrich of Bavaria =

Bavarian prince (1884–1916)

- Heinrich c. 1910
- Born: 24 June 1884; Munich, Kingdom of Bavaria, German Empire
- Died: 8 November 1916 (aged 32); Argeș County, Kingdom of Romania
- Burial: Theatinerkirche, Munich, Bavaria
- House: Wittelsbach
- Father: Prince Arnulf of Bavaria
- Mother: Princess Therese of Liechtenstein
- Signature
- Military career
- Allegiance: German Empire: Kingdom of Bavaria
- Rank: Major
- Units: 1st Royal Bavarian Heavy Cavalry; Royal Bavarian Infantry Lifeguards Regiment
- Commands: III. Battalion Alpenkorps
- Conflicts: World War I: Battle of the Olt Valley †
- Awards: Military Order of Max Joseph; Iron Cross (1914)

Prince Heinrich of Bavaria (24 June 1884 – 8 November 1916) was a member of the Bavarian Royal House of Wittelsbach and a highly decorated Army officer in the First World War.

== Early life ==
Heinrich was born in Munich, Kingdom of Bavaria. He was the only child of Prince Arnulf of Bavaria and his wife Princess Therese of Liechtenstein.

Heinrich was brought up in Munich, where one of his tutors was Joseph Gebhard Himmler, the father of Heinrich Himmler. The elder Himmler was an ardent royalist who, following the birth of his second son, petitioned the prince to allow him to be named after him - Heinrich. The prince agreed and also became Heinrich Himmler's godfather. "{H}e took a lively interest in the progress of his godson and in how the Himmlers were faring. It was a warm relationship, as is shown by the preserved correspondence between Gebhard and the prince; at Christmas the Himmlers regularly received a visit from the prince and his mother..."

== Military career and death ==
At the age of 17, following his Abitur, Heinrich joined the Bavarian army with the rank of Leutnant. Initially, he served with the Royal Bavarian Infanterie-Leib-Regiment, but later was reassigned the 1st Royal Bavarian Heavy Cavalry “Prince Charles of Bavaria”.

After the outbreak of World War I, the regiment saw action on the Western front, where Prince Heinrich was badly wounded. Upon recovering, he returned to his old infantry regiment and in June 1915, was promoted to major. At the same time, he was put in charge of the III. Battalion of the newly established Deutsches Alpenkorps stationed in the Carnic Alps. In late 1916, the battalion was transferred to Romania where it fought at Turnu Roșu Pass. On 7 November 1916, during operations in the area near Poiana Spinului, while conducting a personal reconnaissance of the front line, he was shot by Romanian soldiers. He died due to his injuries the next day. His last words reportedly were, "Noblesse oblige. I do not mean that with respect to my family but rather my duty as an officer."

Heinrich's body was transported back to Munich, where he was buried by his father's side at the Theatinerkirche. On 6 March 1917, for his exceptional bravery, he was awarded the Knight's Cross of the Military Order of Max Joseph, Bavaria's highest military honour.

== Honours ==
Prince Heinrich received the following honours, orders and decorations:

=== German states ===
- Kingdom of Bavaria:
  - Order of Saint Hubert (24 June 1902)
  - Military Order of Max Joseph, Knight's Cross (6 March 1917)
  - Military Merit Order, 4th Class
  - Military Merit Order, 4th Class with Swords (10 October 1914)
  - Military Merit Order, 3rd Class with Swords (18 September 1916)
  - Jubilee Medal for the Bavarian Army (12 March 1905)
  - à la suite of the Royal Bavarian 12th Infantry Regiment "Prinz Arnulf" (Königlich Bayerisches 12. Infanterie-Regiment „Prinz Arnulf“)
- Duchy of Brunswick:
  - Order of Henry the Lion, Grand Cross (16 June 1914)
  - War Merit Cross 2nd Class
- Hohenzollern principalities: Princely House Order of Hohenzollern, Honor Cross 1st Class with Swords (17 August 1916)
- Kingdom of Prussia:
  - Order of the Black Eagle
  - Iron Cross 2nd Class
  - Iron Cross 1st Class
  - Royal House Order of Hohenzollern, Knight's Cross with Swords
- (Saxe-Coburg and Gotha) (Duchy of Saxe-Altenburg) (Saxe-Meiningen) Saxon duchies: Ducal Saxe-Ernestine House Order, Grand Cross (6 November 1907)
- Kingdom of Württemberg: Order of the Württemberg Crown, Grand Cross

=== Foreign states ===
- Austria-Hungary: Military Merit Cross, 3rd Class with War Decoration
- Kingdom of Bulgaria: Order of Saint Alexander, Grand Cross (29 April 1908)
- Ottoman Empire:
  - Order of Glory, Grand Cordon
  - Order of Osmanieh 1st Class (29 April 1908)
  - Liakat Medal in Gold with Sabers
  - War Medal
- Portugal: Military Order of Christ, Grand Cross
- Spain:
  - Order of Charles III, Knight Grand Cross (1906)
  - Cross of the Military Knightly Order of Our Lady of Montesa (1906)

== Ancestry ==
Ancestors of Prince Heinrich of Bavaria

8. Ludwig I of Bavaria
4. Luitpold, Prince Regent of Bavaria
9. Princess Therese of Saxe-Hildburghausen
2. Prince Arnulf of Bavaria
10. Leopold II, Grand Duke of Tuscany
5. Archduchess Auguste Ferdinande of Austria
11. Princess Maria Anna of Saxony
1. Prince Heinrich of Bavaria
12. Johann I Joseph, Prince of Liechtenstein
6. Aloys II, Prince of Liechtenstein
13. Landgravine Josepha of Fürstenberg-Weitra
3. Princess Theresa of Liechtenstein
14. Count Franz de Paula Kinsky von Wchinitz und Tettau
7. Countess Franziska Kinsky of Wchinitz and Tettau
15. Countess Therese of Wrbna and Freudenthal
