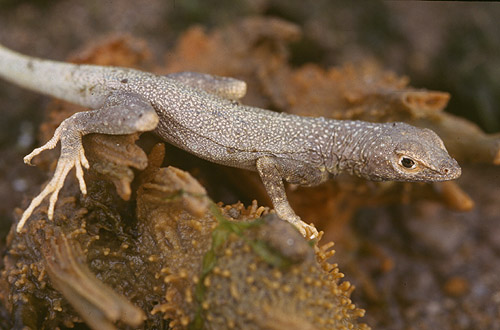

Conservation status
- Least Concern (IUCN 3.1)

Scientific classification
- Kingdom: Animalia
- Phylum: Chordata
- Class: Reptilia
- Order: Squamata
- Suborder: Iguania
- Family: Tropiduridae
- Genus: Microlophus
- Species: M. theresiae

Binomial name
- Microlophus theresiae (Steindachner, 1901)

Synonyms
- Tropidurus theresiae Steindachner, 1901; Microlophus theresiae — Torres-Carvajal, 2004

= Microlophus theresiae =

Species of lizard

Microlophus theresiae, commonly called Theresia's Pacific iguana, is a species of lizard in the family Tropiduridae.

== Etymology ==
The specific name, theresiae, is in honor of Princess Theresa of Bavaria, who collected the type specimens.

== Geographic range ==
M. theresiae is endemic to Peru.

== Habitat ==
The preferred natural habitats of M. theresiae are desert and shrubland, at altitudes from sea level to 200 m (660 ft).

== Diet ==
M. theresiae preys upon aquatic Hemiptera.

== Reproduction ==
M. theresiae is oviparous.
