= Matei Castriș =

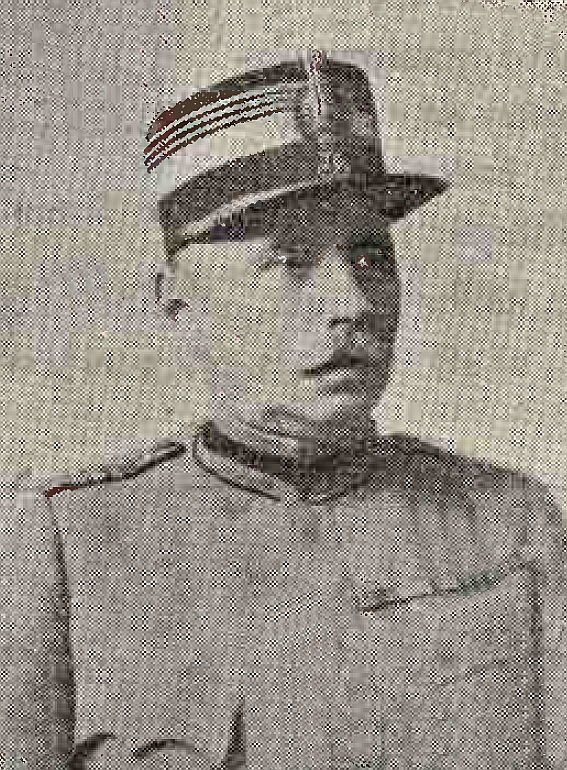
- Born: November 6, 1863
- Died: 1924 (aged 61); Bucharest, Romania
- Military career
- Allegiance: Romania
- Branch: Romanian Land Forces
- Service years: 1884 — 1916
- Rank: Brigadier General
- Conflicts: Second Balkan War; World War I; Battle of Nagyszeben; Battle of Transylvania
- Awards: Order of the Star of Romania, officer rank (1913); Order of the Crown "The Rise of the Country" Medal (1913); The "Sanitary Merit" Cross (1914)

Matei Castriș was a Romanian Brigadier General who was one of the generals of the Romanian Land Forces in the First World War. He served as division commander in the 1916 campaign. He was commanded due to the hesitant manner of leading the subordinate troops, which led to the failure of the occupation of the city of Sibiu, during the initial period of the campaign.

== Biography ==
After graduating from the military school of officers with the rank of lieutenant, Matei Castriș held various positions in the infantry units or in the upper echelons of the army, the most important being the commander of the 1st Border Guard Regiment or the 18th Infantry Brigade.

During the First World War he served as commander of the 1st Border Guard Brigade, between 14/27 August - 28 August / 10 September 1916 and of the 23rd Infantry Division, between 28 August / 10 September - 9/22 September 1916.

== Bibliography ==
- Kiritescu, Constantin, History of the war for the unification of Romania, Scientific and Encyclopedic Publishing House, Bucharest, 1989
- Ioanițiu Alexandru (Lt.-Colonel), The Romanian War: 1916-1918, vol 1, Genius Printing House, Bucharest, 1929
- Romania in the World War 1916-1919, Documents, Annexes, Volume 1, Official Gazette and State Printing Offices, Bucharest, 1934
- The General Headquarters of the Romanian Army. Documents 1916 - 1920 , Machiavelli Publishing House, Bucharest, 1996
- Military history of the Romanian people, vol. V, Military Publishing House, Bucharest, 1989
- Romania in the years of the First World War, Militară Publishing House, Bucharest, 1987
- "Romania in the First World War", Military Publishing House, 1979
