= Simionești =

Simionești may refer to several villages in Romania:

- Simionești, a village in Budacu de Jos Commune, Bistrița-Năsăud County
- Simionești, a village in Cordun Commune, Neamț County

== See also ==
- Simionescu (surname)
