= Prince Arnulf of Bavaria =

German prince and military general (1852–1907)

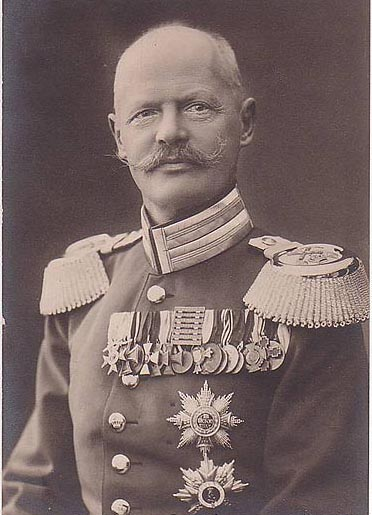
- Arnulf in 1897
- Born: 6 July 1852; Munich, Kingdom of Bavaria
- Died: 12 November 1907 (aged 55); Venice, Kingdom of Italy
- Burial: Theatinerkirche, Munich
- Spouse: Princess Therese of Liechtenstein (m. 1882)
- Issue: Prince Heinrich
- House: Wittelsbach
- Father: Luitpold, Prince Regent of Bavaria
- Mother: Archduchess Augusta of Austria

Prince Arnulf of Bavaria (German: Franz Joseph Arnulf Adalbert Maria Prinz von Bayern; 6 July 1852 – 12 November 1907) was a member of the Bavarian Royal House of Wittelsbach and a General of Infantry.

== Early life ==
Arnulf was born in Munich, Bavaria. He was the youngest son of Prince Regent Luitpold of Bavaria and his wife Archduchess Augusta of Austria.

== Military career ==
As his older brothers, Arnulf joined the Bavarian army and became a regimental commander, reaching the rank Generaloberst. He fought with the Russian army in the Russo-Turkish War (1877–78) and was present at the Siege of Plevna. From 1892 to 1903 he commanded the First Bavarian Army Corps.

In 1901 Arnulf represented his father Prince Regent Luitpold at the funeral of Queen Victoria of the United Kingdom.

== Marriage and family ==
On 12 April 1882 Arnulf married Princess Therese of Liechtenstein, the daughter of Prince Alois II of Liechtenstein and Countess Franziska Kinsky. The wedding took place in the Palais Liechtenstein in Vienna, Austria. The couple had one son:

- Prince Heinrich of Bavaria (1884–1916)

== Death ==
Arnulf died on 12 November 1907 in Venice, Italy. He is buried in the crypt of the Theatinerkirche in Munich, Bavaria.

== Honours ==
He received the following orders and decorations:

- Kingdom of Bavaria:
  - Knight of St. Hubert
  - Grand Cross of the Military Merit Order
  - Jubilee Medal
  - Bronze Commemorative Medal for 1870/71
  - China Commemorative Medal in Steel
  - Service Award Cross, 1st Class
- (Austrian Empire) (Kingdom of Hungary) Austria-Hungary:
  - Knight of the Golden Fleece, 1873
  - Grand Cross of the Royal Hungarian Order of St. Stephen, 1893
- Baden:
  - Knight of the House Order of Fidelity, 1885
  - Knight of the Order of Berthold the First, 1885
- Belgium: Grand Cordon of the Order of Leopold, 1900 – wedding gift
- (Saxe-Coburg and Gotha) (Duchy of Saxe-Altenburg) (Saxe-Meiningen) Ernestine duchies: Grand Cross of the Saxe-Ernestine House Order
- Grand Duchy of Hesse:
  - Military Merit Cross, 17 June 1873
  - Grand Cross of the Ludwig Order, 26 July 1874
- Kingdom of Italy: Knight of the Annunciation, 28 April 1883
- Luxembourg: Knight of the Gold Lion of Nassau
- Mecklenburg:
  - Grand Cross of the Wendish Crown, with Crown in Ore
  - Military Merit Cross, 2nd Class (Schwerin)
- Principality of Montenegro: Grand Cross of the Order of Prince Danilo I
- Kingdom of Prussia:
  - Knight of the Black Eagle, 8 November 1874
  - Grand Commander's Cross of the Royal House Order of Hohenzollern, 11 June 1879
  - Iron Cross (1870), 2nd Class
- Hohenzollern: Cross of Honour of the Princely House Order of Hohenzollern, 1st Class
- Russian Empire:
  - Knight of St. Andrew
  - Knight of St. George, 4th Class
- Saxe-Weimar-Eisenach: Grand Cross of the White Falcon, 1888
- Kingdom of Saxony: Knight of the Rue Crown, 1893
- (Tuscany) Tuscan Grand Ducal Family: Grand Cross of St. Joseph
- Württemberg: Grand Cross of the Württemberg Crown, 1885

== Ancestry ==
Ancestors of Prince Arnulf of Bavaria

8. Maximilian I Joseph of Bavaria
4. Ludwig I of Bavaria
9. Princess Augusta Wilhelmine of Hesse-Darmstadt
2. Luitpold, Prince Regent of Bavaria
10. Frederick, Duke of Saxe-Altenburg
5. Princess Therese of Saxe-Hildburghausen
11. Duchess Charlotte Georgine of Mecklenburg-Strelitz
1. Prince Arnulf of Bavaria
12. Ferdinand III, Grand Duke of Tuscany
6. Leopold II, Grand Duke of Tuscany
13. Princess Luisa of Naples and Sicily
3. Archduchess Auguste Ferdinande of Austria
14. Maximilian, Hereditary Prince of Saxony
7. Princess Maria Anna of Saxony
15. Princess Carolina of Parma
