= 7 cm Gebirgsgeschütz M 99 =

World War I mountain artillery

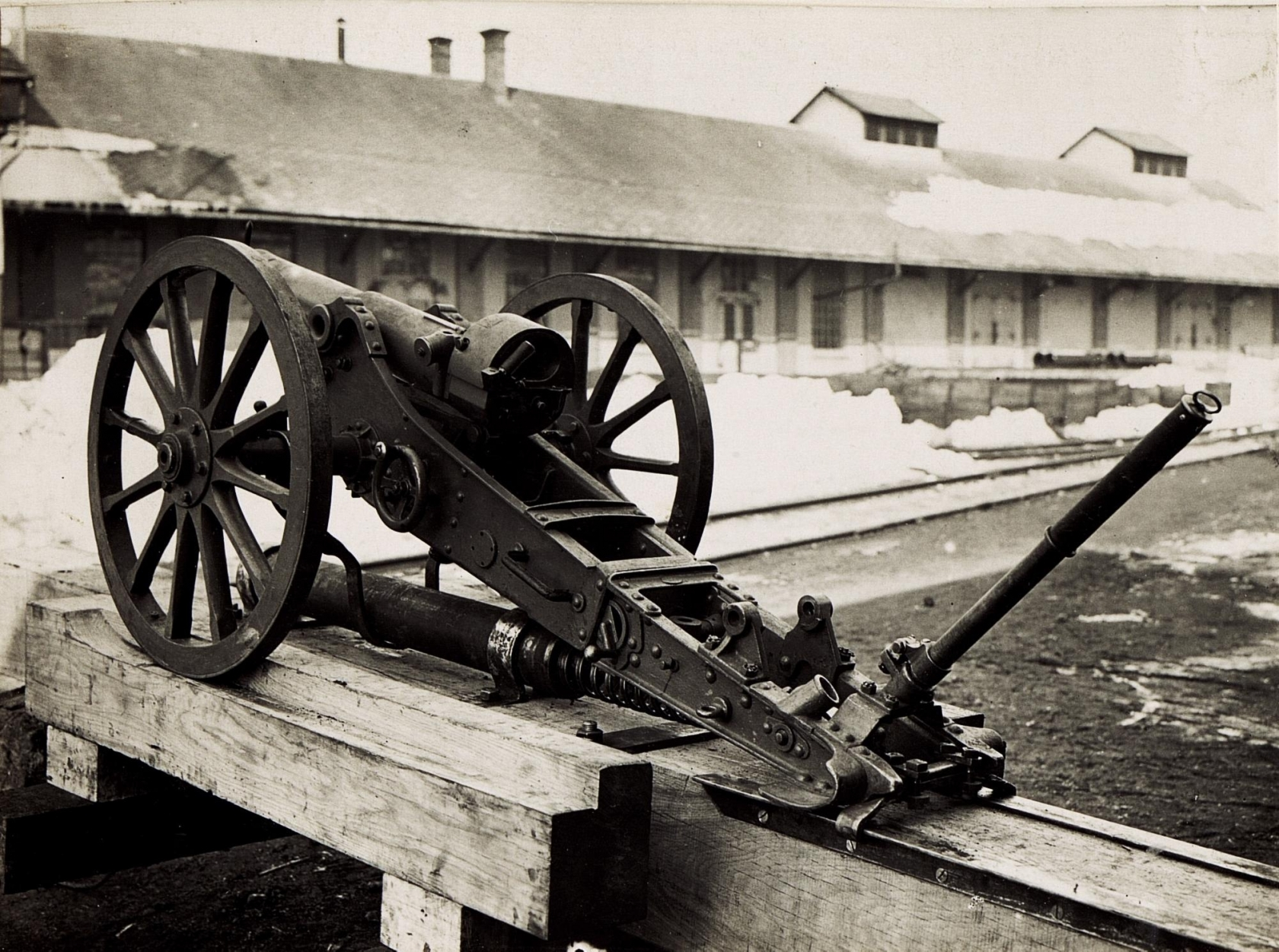
- A Gebirgsgeschütz M 99 during World War I
- Type: Mountain gun
- Place of origin: Austria-Hungary

Service history
- In service: 1902?-1918
- Used by: Austria-Hungary
- Wars: World War I

Production history
- Designed: 1899-1902
- No. built: 300

Specifications
- Mass: 315 kilograms (694 lb)
- Shell: 4.68 kg (10.3 lb)
- Caliber: 70 millimetres (2.8 in)
- Breech: Eccentric interrupted screw
- Recoil: none
- Carriage: Box trail
- Elevation: -10° to +26°
- Muzzle velocity: 310 m/s (1,000 ft/s)
- Maximum firing range: 4,800 m (5,200 yd)
- References: http://www.landships.info/landships/artillery_articles/7cm_Gebk_M99.html

The 7 cm Gebirgsgeschütz M 99 was a mountain gun used by Austria-Hungary during World War I. It was obsolete upon introduction as it had a bronze barrel, a spring-loaded spade to absorb the recoil forces and it had to be relaid after every shot. The high elevations required of mountain guns greatly complicated the provision of barrel recoil systems as the breech could recoil into the ground, and it would be some years before satisfactory systems were developed. These would result in the 7 cm Gebirgsgeschütz M 8 and M 9 that used the same barrel and ammunition as the M 99, but had Gun shields and more advanced recoil systems. These guns weighed 402 kilograms (886 lb) and 456 kilograms (1,005 lb) respectively, although the exact differences between them are unclear other than they broke down into four and five loads for transport respectively.

The Gebirgsgeschütz M 99 broke down into three loads for transport.

== Bibliography ==
- Ortner, M. Christian. Austro-Hungarian Artillery From 1867 to 1918: Technology, Organization, and Tactics. Vienna, Verlag Militaria, 2007 ISBN 978-3-902526-13-7
