= Grigore Simionescu =

Romanian world war I Divisionary commander

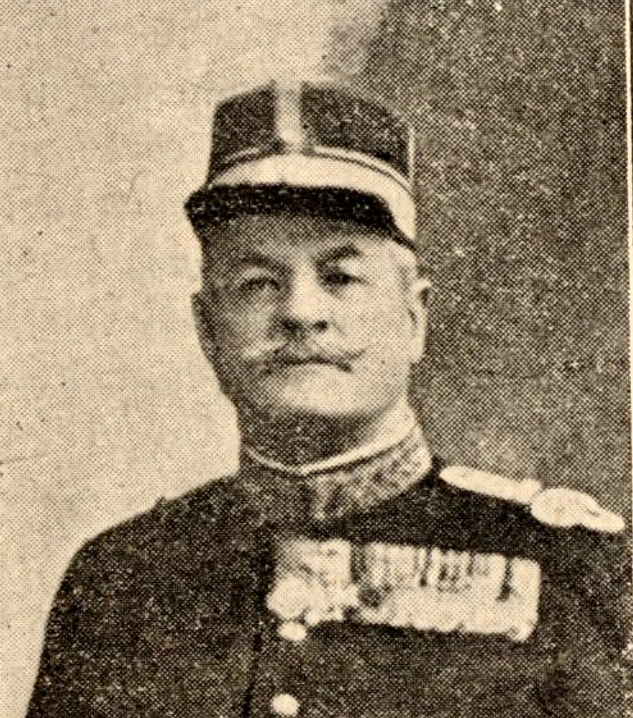
- Born: March 22, 1867
- Died: December 20, 1932 (aged 75); Bucharest, Kingdom of Romania
- Children: love<3
- Military career
- Allegiance: United Principalities; Romania
- Branch: Romanian Land Forces
- Service years: 1877—1918
- Commands: Brigadier General
- Conflicts: Russo-Turkish War; Second Balkan War; World War I; Battle of Nagyszeben
- Awards: Order of the Star of Romania (1912); Order of the Crown (1907); Cross of the Danube Crossing (1878); Medal of the Defenders of Independence (1878)

Grigore Simionescu (March 22, 1857 – December 20, 1932) was a Romanian officer who was one of the generals of the Romanian Army in World War I. He served as divisionary commander in the 1916 campaign.

== Biography ==
Grigore Simionescu participated as a soldier in the military actions of the Russo-Turkish War from 1877–1878. After graduating from the military school for non-commissioned officers from Dealu Monastery and the exam for passing among the officers' corps, he received the rank of lieutenant, in 1880.

He held various positions in the infantry units or in the upper echelons of the army, the most important being those of commander of the 19th Infantry Regiment and chief of staff of the army corps. It was placed in reserves in 1915.

At the outbreak of World War I he was recalled to activity, being appointed commander of the 8th Infantry Brigade. He was commander of coverage in the Predeal area, headed by the busy city of Brașov. From August 16 to 29, 1916 he served as commander of the 4th Infantry Division, from August 25 to September 7, 1916 and from September 22 to October 5, 1916. He was wounded in the Battle of Porumbacu, on September 16 to 29, 1916.

Between February 20 and July 10, 1917, he commanded the Prisoner of War Camp in Șipote.

== Bibliography ==
- Kirițescu, Constantin, History of the war for the unification of Romania, Scientific and Encyclopedic Publishing House, Bucharest, 1989
- Ioanițiu, Alexandru, The Romanian War: 1916-1918, vol 1, Genius Printing House, Bucharest, 1929
  - Romania in the World War 1916-1919, Documents, Annexes, Volume 1, Official Gazette and State Printing Offices, Bucharest, 1934
  - The General Headquarters of the Romanian Army. Documents 1916 - 1920, Machiavelli Publishing House, Bucharest, 1996
  - Military history of the Romanian people, vol. V, Military Publishing House, Bucharest, 1989
  - Romania in the years of the First World War, Militară Publishing House, Bucharest, 1987
  - "Romania in the First World War", Militară Publishing House, Bucharest, 1979
