= Theatine Church, Munich =

Theatiner Church
- German: Theatinerkirche St. Kajetan
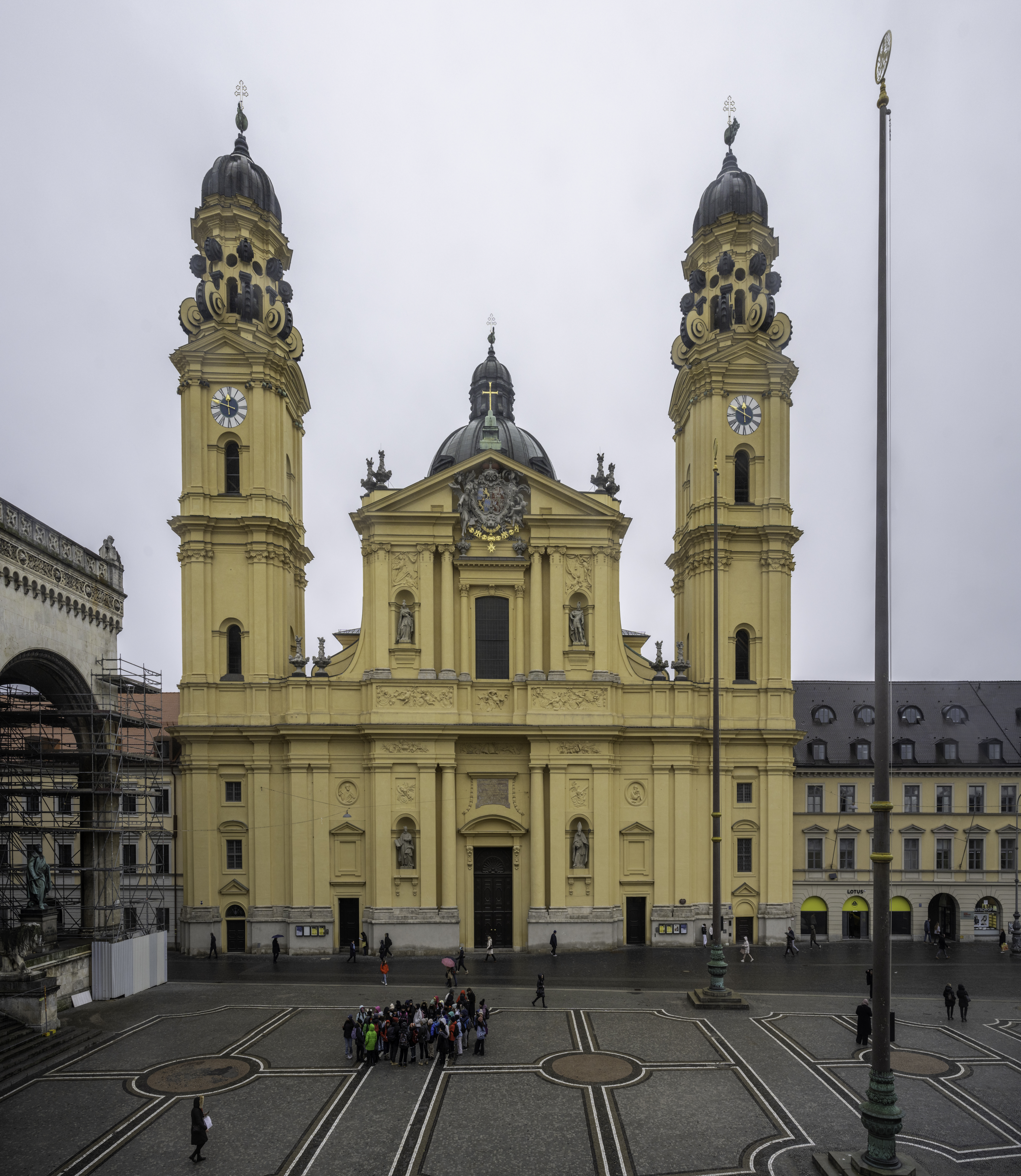

- Location within Bavaria Location within Germany
- 48°08′31″N 11°34′35″E
- Location: Salvatorplatz 2a Munich, Bavaria
- Country: Germany
- Denomination: Roman Catholic
- Website: www.theatinerkirche.de

History
- Status: Order Church
- Dedication: Saint Cajetan
- Consecrated: 11 July, 1675

Architecture
- Functional status: Active
- Style: Baroque and Rococo
- Years built: 1663–1688; 1676–1690 (towers); 1765–1768 (façade)
- Groundbreaking: 29 April, 1663
- Completed: 1768

Specifications
- Capacity: 400
- Length: 72 metres (236 ft)
- Width: 15.5 metres (51 ft)

Administration
- Archdiocese: Munich and Freising

Clergy
- Pastor: P. Dr. Robert Mehlhart OP

The Theatine Church of St. Cajetan and Adelaide (German: Theatinerkirche St. Kajetan und Adelheid) is a Roman Catholic church in Munich, Southern Germany. Built between 1663 and 1690, it was founded by Elector Ferdinand Maria and his wife, Henriette Adelaide of Savoy, as a gesture of thanks for the birth of the long-awaited heir to the Bavarian crown in 1662, Prince Max Emanuel. Currently administered by the Dominican Order, it is also known as the Dominican Priory of St. Cajetan.

The church was built in Italian High Baroque style, inspired by Sant'Andrea della Valle in Rome, and designed by Italian architect Agostino Barelli. His successor, Enrico Zuccalli, added two towers (64.6 metres (212 ft) height), which were not originally included in the plans, and completed the dome (71 metres (233 ft) height) in 1690. The church has a length of 72 metres (236 ft) and width of 15.5 metres (51 ft). The Rococo style façade by François de Cuvilliés was completed in 1768. The Mediterranean appearance and yellow coloring became a well known symbol for the city and had a lasting impact on Baroque architecture in Southern Germany.

== Architecture ==
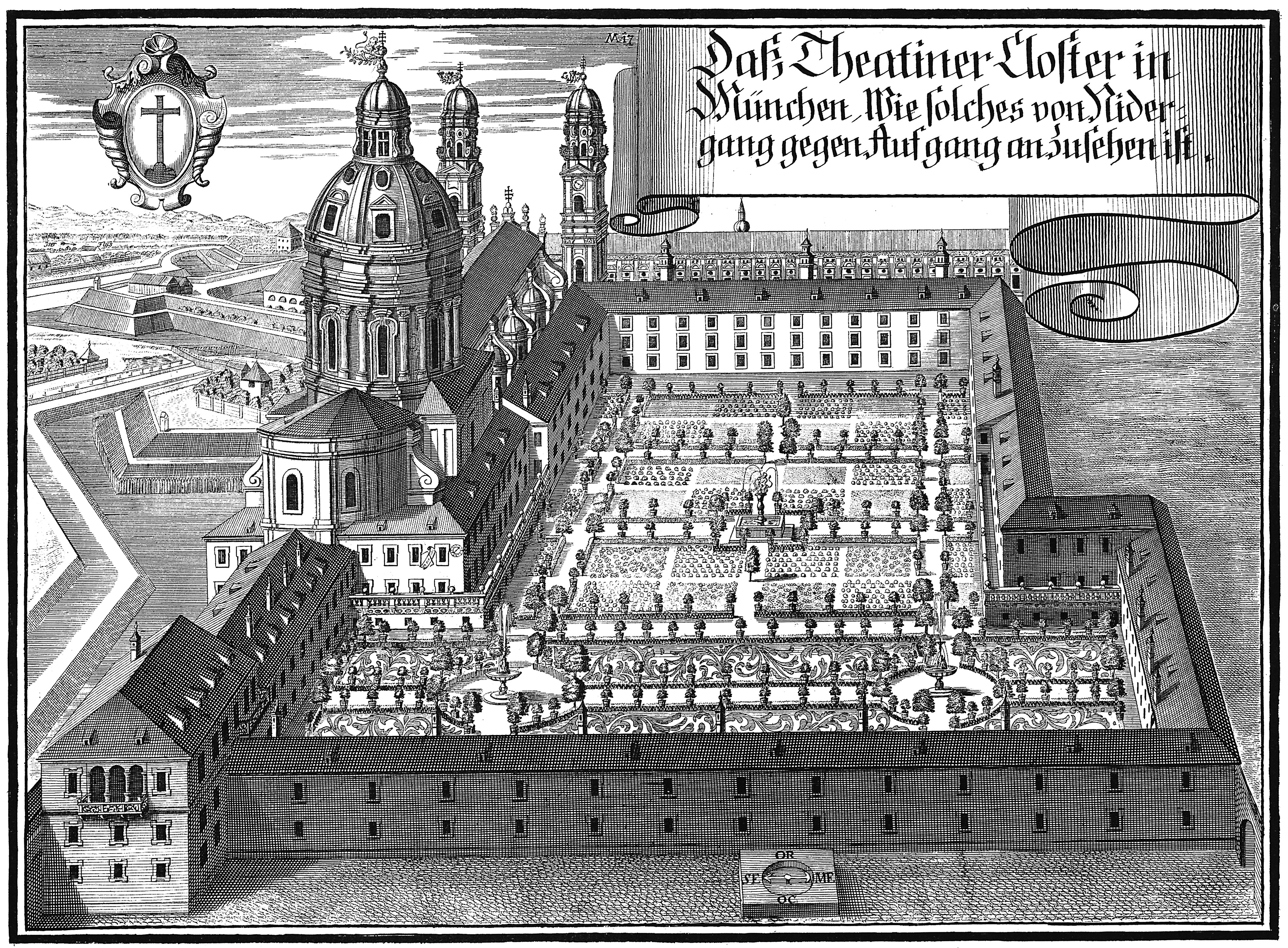
Theatinerkirche, c. 1700 (Copperplate engraving by Michael Wening)

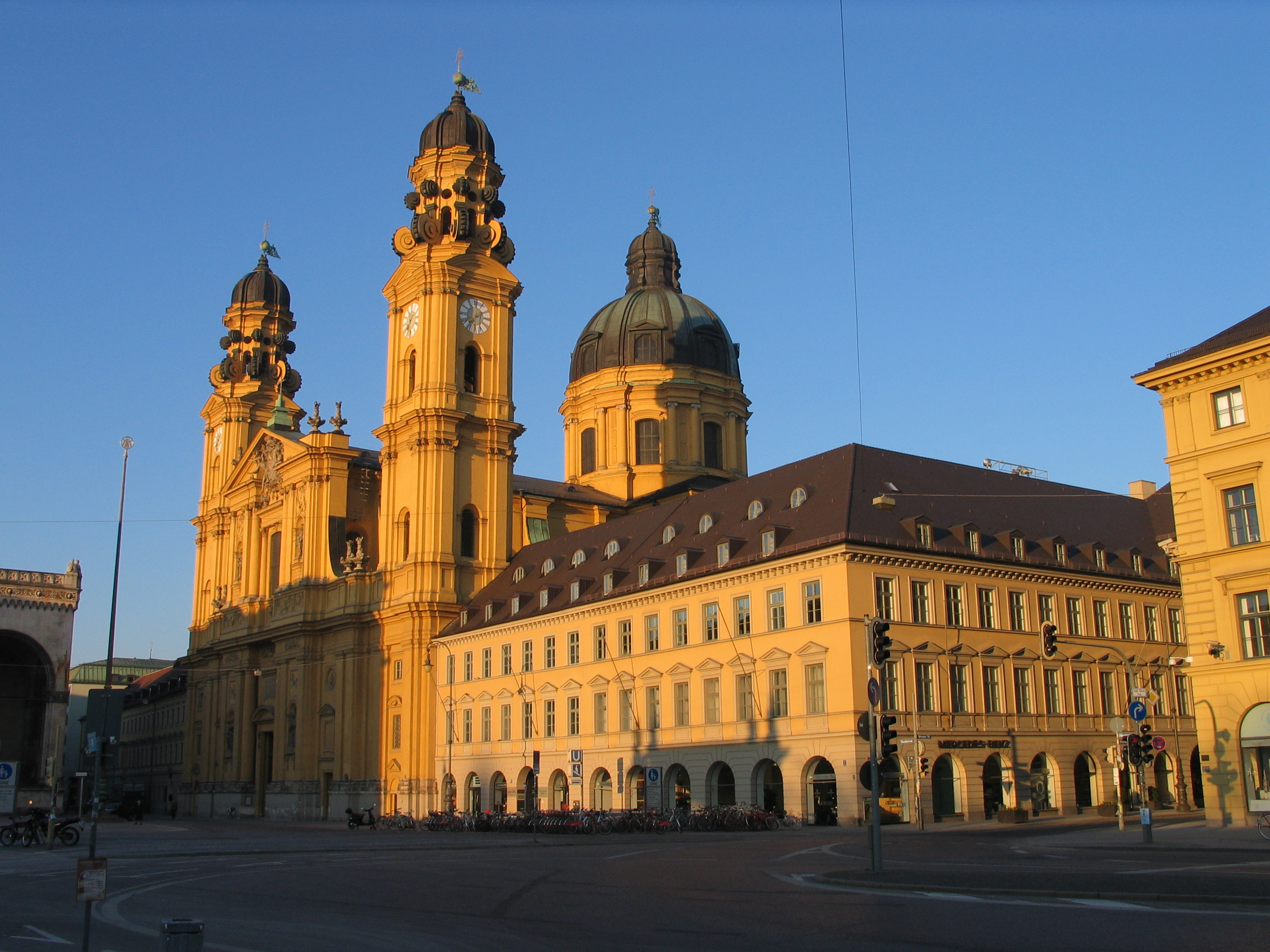
Theatinerkirche, Munich (2005)

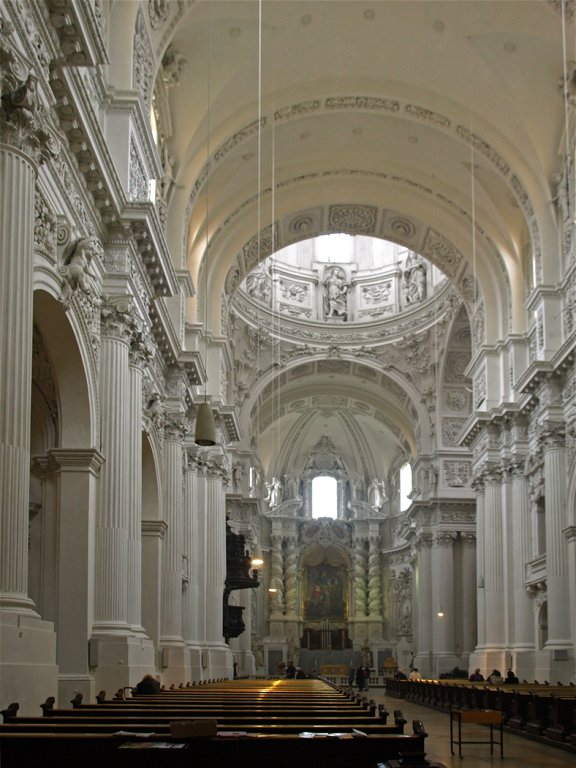
Nave, Theatinerkirche (2008)

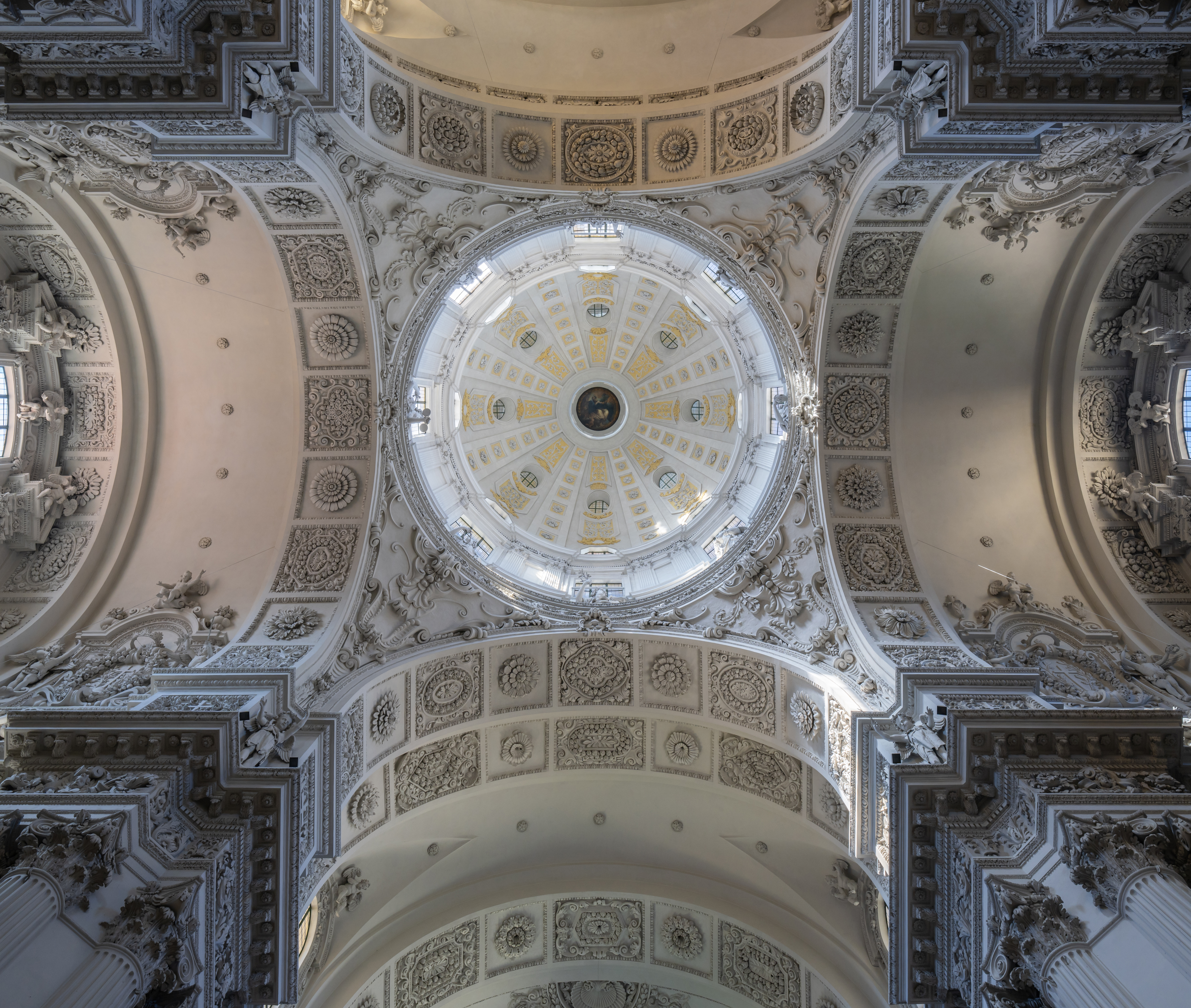
Dome, Theatinerkirche (2023)

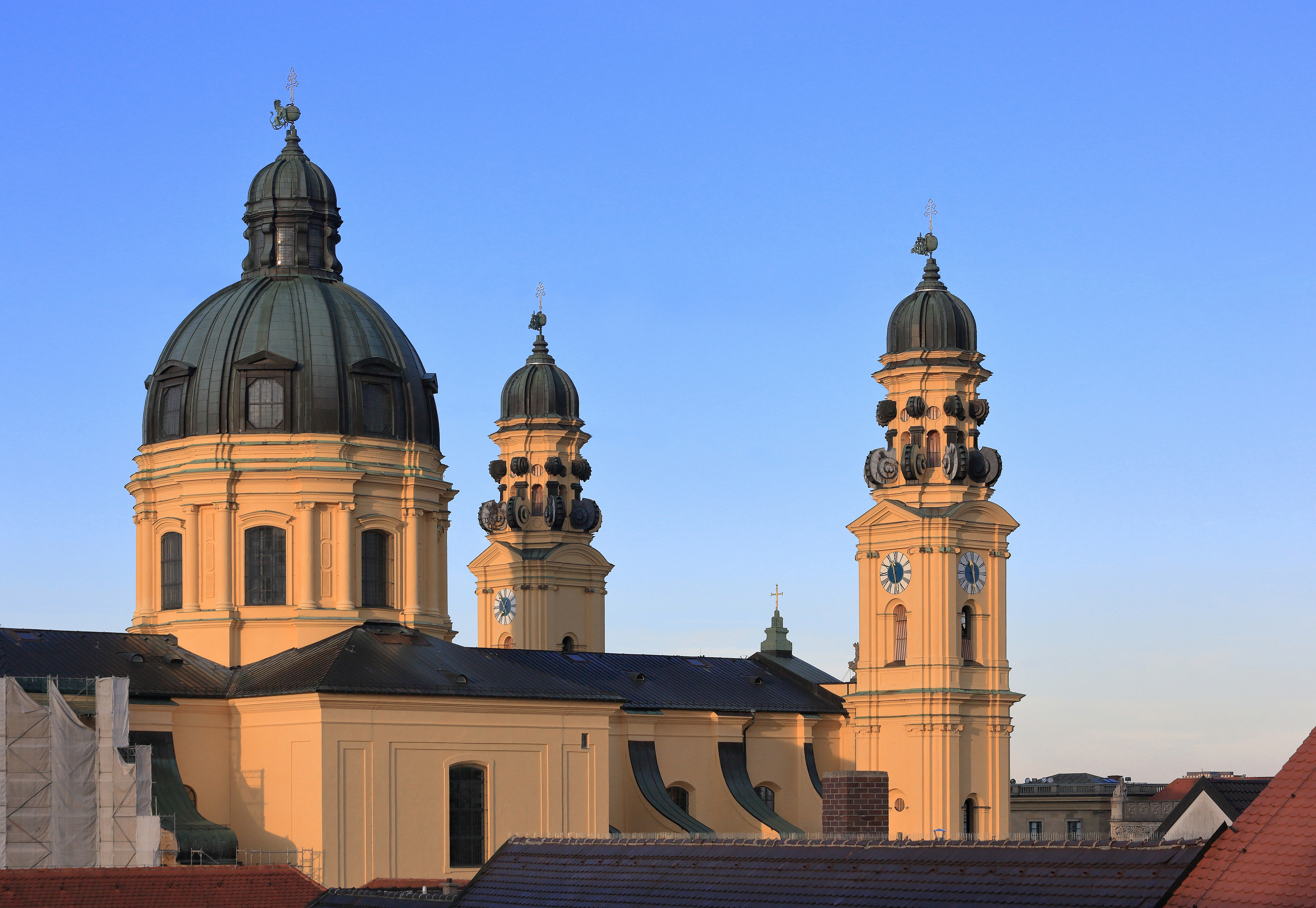
Theatinerkirche, view from the South (2018)

Following the birth of crown prince and (later) elector Max Emanuel on 11 July, 1662, Agostino Barelli (Bologna) received the design contract. The northeast corner of the Kreuzviertel, directly adjacent to the city wall and Schwabinger Tor, which lies opposite the Residence, was chosen as the building site for the church and monastery. The cornerstone was laid as early as 29 April, 1663. Barelli took as his model the Theatine mother church, Sant'Andrea della Valle in Rome. The chosen spatial type for the church was a domed basilica on a Latin cross plan.

During the construction work, disagreements arose between Agostino Barelli and his construction manager, Antonio Spinelli, who was himself a Theatine friar and the confessor of Henriette Adelaide of Savoy. These disagreements led to Barelli's temporary dismissal. In the end, Barelli completed the shell of the building in 1674 and then left Munich.

After that, Enrico Zuccalli took over the artistic direction. The focus of his work was the exterior design. Zuccalli determined the shape of the domed tambour and later also of the two towers. At the same time, Zuccalli also worked on the interior design from 1674. In the same year, Como artists Giovanni Nicolò Perti and Giovanni Viscardi, along with Abraham Leuthner, began the stucco work. Andreas Faistenberger created the large black pulpit (1686). The altarpieces were by Caspar de Crayer, Carlo Cignani, Georg Desmarées, and Joachim von Sandrart. Balthasar Ableithner created large statues of the Four Evangelists (1675), but only two statues (Mark and John) have survived the destruction of World War II.

The church was consecrated on 11 July, 1675, at which time it was still largely a shell. Discussions about the final design of the façade delayed completion. Enrico Zuccalli built the towers according to his own plans between 1684 and 1692; the interior design was completed in 1688. From 1692 until its completion, Giovanni Viscardi took over the construction management. Henriette Adelaide of Savoy died in 1676 and did not live to see the completion of the Theatinerkirche.

The double-tower façade of the Theatinerkirche remained unfinished for a long time. It was only about 100 years after the consecration that François de Cuvilliés the Elder designed a façade in Rococo style in 1765, with only slight changes, which his son François de Cuvilliés the Younger completed. The monastery was built in Zuccalli's style, under whose direction the master builder Lorenzo Perti constructed the buildings. By 1768, the work was completed.

When the Schwabinger Tor was demolished in 1817, the Theatinerkirche at Odeonsplatz became a significant focal point with the construction of Ludwigstrasse. The façade of the Ludwigskirche with two towers was later built as a counterweight to the Theatinerkirche, which is diagonally opposite.

== History ==
The Theatins gained a good reputation as pastors and scholars until the end of the 18th century, when increasing moral and financial decline became apparent. On 26 October, 1801, Elector Max IV Joseph, who later became King Max I Joseph, dissolved the monastery even before the secularization. During the secularization, the monastery and the church came into the possession of the state. They are therefore still the property of the Free State of Bavaria. The Theatinerkirche remained a collegiate and court church, while the convent building became the seat of the Elector's Finance, Justice and Spiritual Affairs departments (ministries), after the Department of Foreign Affairs had already moved into the still-existing Theatine monastery in 1799.

During World War II, particularly in 1944/1945, the church and monastery (except for the west wing) were severely damaged. The altarpiece "The Elector and his Wife Endow the Theatine Church" (Antonio Zanchi, 1675) was destroyed. Reconstruction began in 1946 and was largely completed by 1955. Since 1954, The rebuilding of the former monastery grounds was completed in 1973. The resulting building complex now houses the State Department for Education and Culture and the State Department for Science and Art. From 2001 to 2019, a step-by-step interior and exterior renovation of the church took place.

== Organs ==
There are three organs at Theatinerkirche: The main organ (1960/2009; 49 stops/68 ranks) behind the high altar in the choir, the antiphonal organ (1950; 17 stops/23 ranks) on the right gallery opposite the pulpit (playable from a two-manual console and the five-manual main console), and a four-stop chamber organ (2018).

== Burials ==
A small side chapel contains the tombs of King Maximilian II (reg. 1848-1864) and his consort Queen Marie. The crypt contains the Prince's Tomb, where (among others) the following members of the Wittelsbach Bavarian Royal Family were buried:

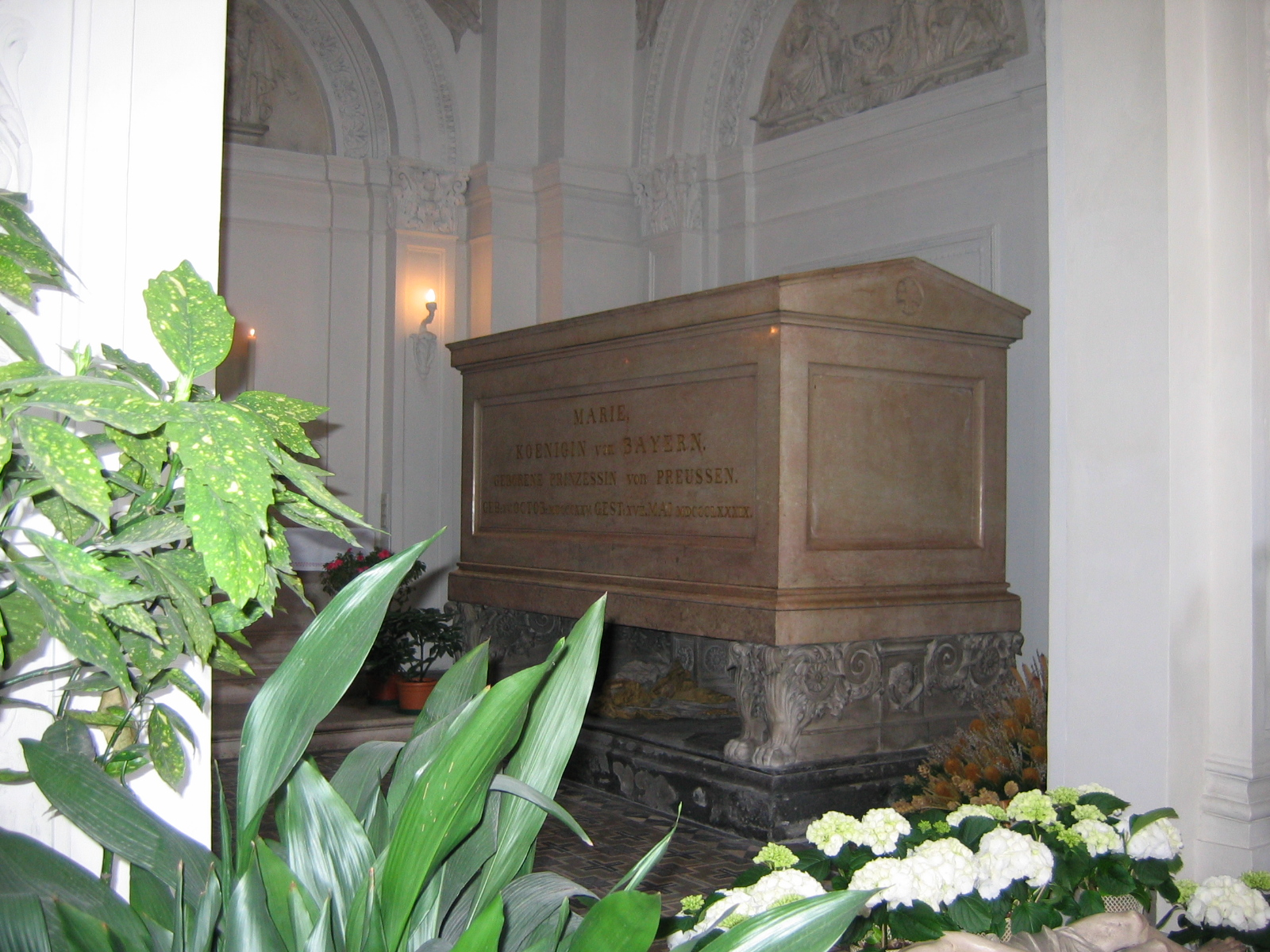
Tomb of Queen Marie of Bavaria

- Princess Henriette Adelaide of Savoy
- Ferdinand Maria, Elector of Bavaria, (reg. 1651-1679)
- Maximilian II Emanuel, Elector of Bavaria, (reg. 1679-1726)
- Charles VII, Holy Roman Emperor, (reg. 1726-1745)
- Maximilian III, Elector of Bavaria, (reg. 1745-1777)
- Charles Theodore, Elector of Bavaria, (reg. 1777-1799)
- King Maximilian I Joseph of Bavaria, (reg. 1799-1825)
- King Otto of Greece, (reg. 1832-1862)
- Luitpold, Prince Regent of Bavaria, (reg. 1886-1912)
- Princess Alexandra of Bavaria
- Rupprecht, Crown Prince of Bavaria
- Duchess Maria Anna Josepha of Bavaria
- Duchess Marie Gabrielle in Bavaria
- Prince Heinrich of Bavaria
