= Berlin Musical Instrument Museum =

Museum in Germany

Coordinates: 52°30′37″N 13°22′15″E

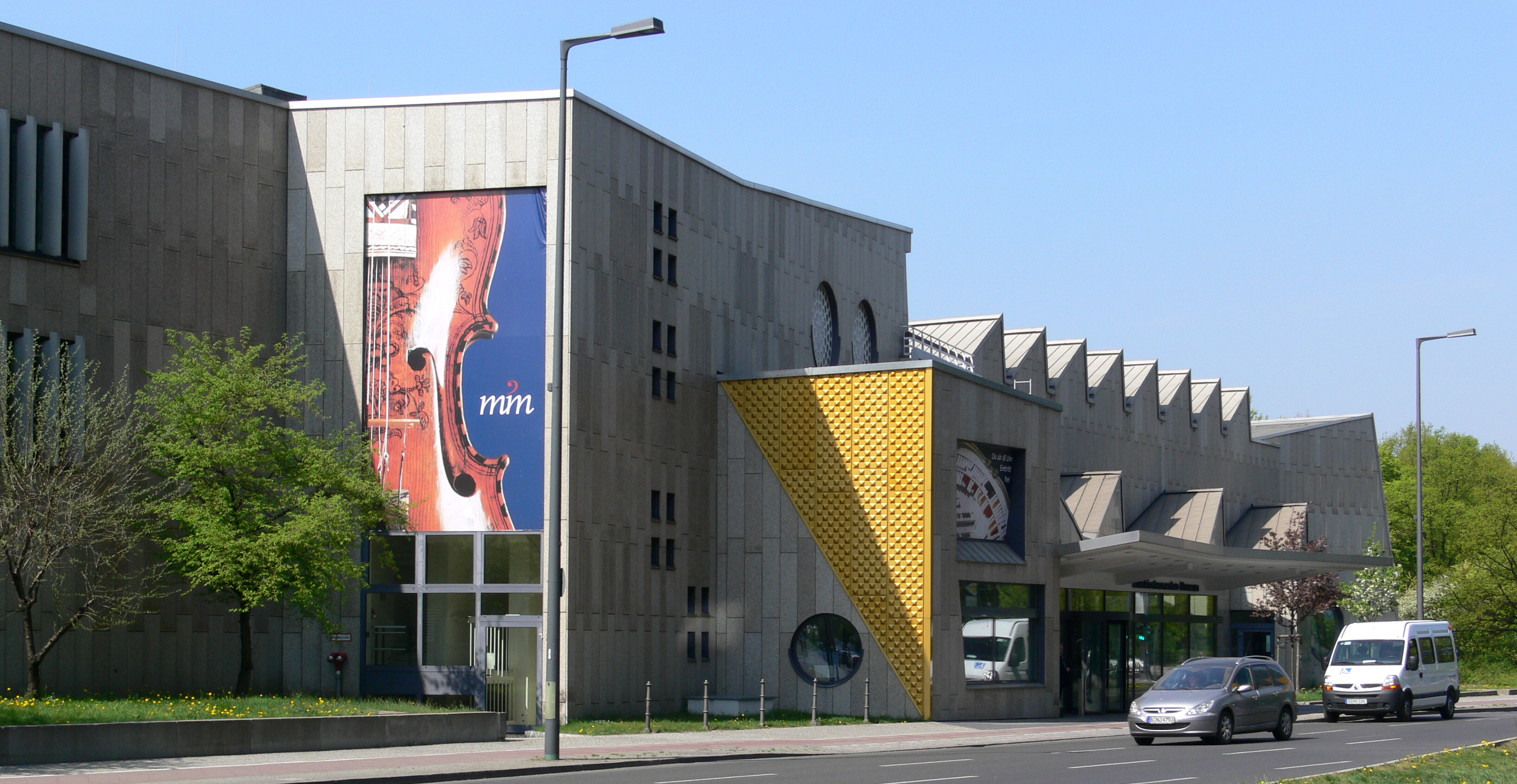
Exterior

Berlin Musical Instrument Museum, Berlin

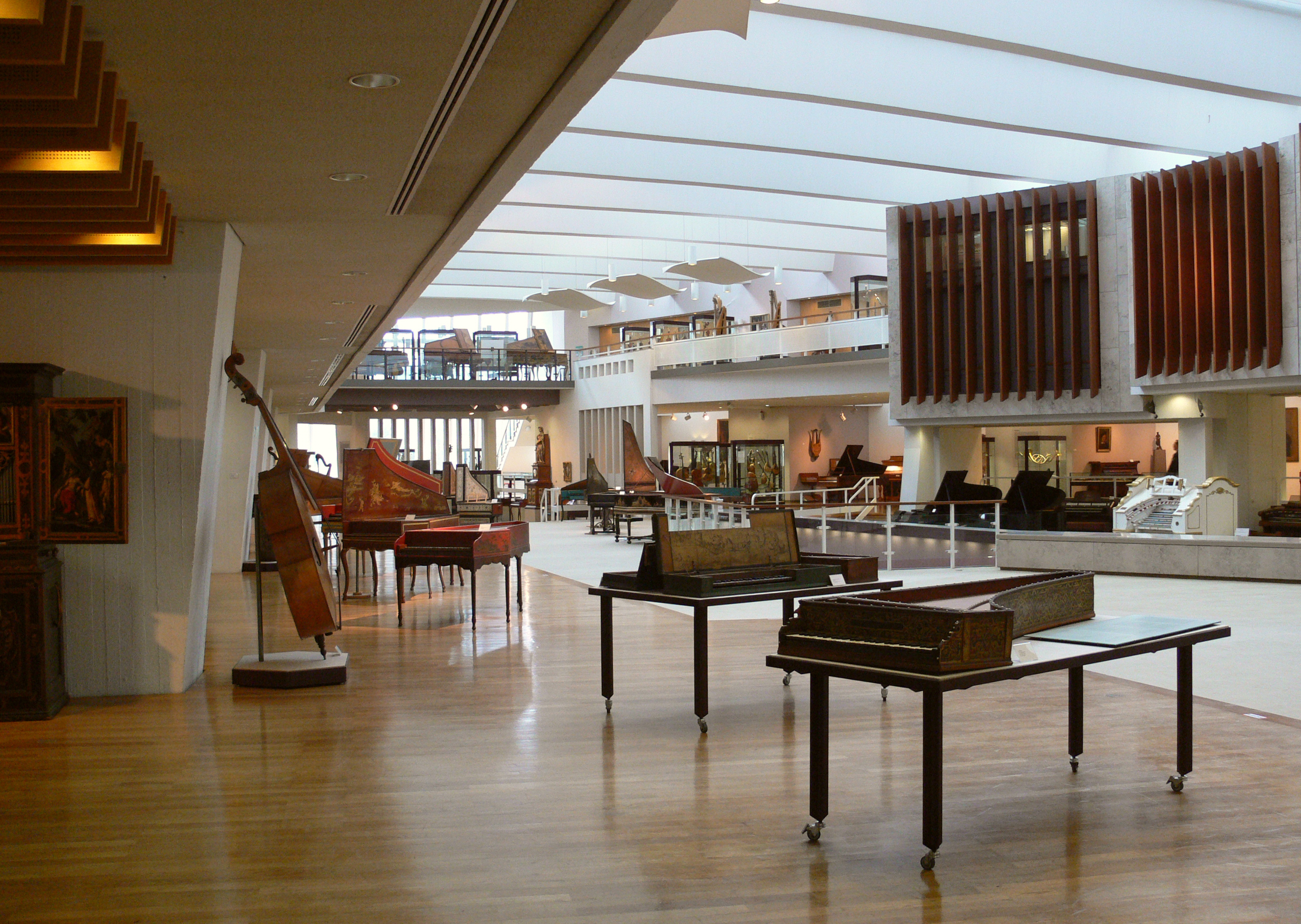
Interior

The Berlin Musical Instrument Museum (German: Musikinstrumenten-Museum Berlin) is located at the Kulturforum on Tiergartenstraße in Berlin, Germany. The museum holds over 3,500 musical instruments from the 16th century onward and is one of the largest and most representative musical instrument collections in Germany. Objects include a portable harpsichord once owned by Prussia's Queen Sophie Charlotte, flutes from the collection of Frederick the Great, and Benjamin Franklin's glass harmonica.

About 800 exhibits are presented in permanent exhibition. Those instruments that are still playable are played regularly. The Musical Instrument Museum (MIM) is part of the State Institute for Music Research, under the auspices of the Prussian Cultural Heritage Foundation.

== History ==
=== 19th century ===
The museum was founded in 1888 at the Royal Academy of Music in Berlin from a collection assembled by Philipp Spitta and Joseph Joachim. Thirty-four instruments from the Museum of Decorative Arts, which had once been heard at the state court of the Kingdom of Prussia, formed the basis of the collection. By 1890 the museum had purchased hundreds more from Leipzig publisher and music dealer Paul de Wit. The world famous "Bach Cembalo" is one of these.

=== 20th century ===
The largest acquisitions were made by Oskar Fleischer, first director from 1892 to 1919, with financial support from Wilhelm II. In 1902 over 1,400 instruments from the private collection Ghent Attorney César Snoeck were acquired, including four 17th century Ruckers harpsichords as well as one of the few original transverse flutes by Jean Hotteterre. Curt Sachs, director from 1919 to 1933, brought a scientific approach to the collections. He was one of the founders of modern organology (the study of musical instruments) and co-authored the Sachs-Hornbostel system of instrument classification. The museum rose to international importance and his catalogs form the basis of academic research papers to this day.

When the Nazis seized power in 1933, Sachs was dismissed from his post by the Nazi Party and forced to emigrate because he was Jewish. In 1935, the musical instrument collection was removed from the Academy to the new National Institute for German Music Research headed by Max Seiffert. The new Museum opened its doors at the Palais von Kreutz at Klosterstraße 36 in 1936, and by World War II it owned over 4,000 instruments. During the war, the museum and its collection was almost completely destroyed. In 1943, holdings were evacuated from Berlin to protect them from Allied bombing. Despite extensive security measures, a large portion was lost. In January 1945 "by decree of the Reich Minister for Science, Education and Public Education," the museum was closed. By war's end, the building was a ruin and only 700 instruments of the original collection survived.

In the immediate aftermath of the war, what was left of the museum and institute was directly administered by the government of West Berlin and in 1949 moved to temporary quarters at Charlottenburg Palace. Despite sparse funding, a painstaking effort was mounted to reconstruct the musical instrument collection. In 1950, on the 200th anniversary of the death of Johann Sebastian Bach, the institute held its first chamber concert on the museum's historical instruments in the Oak Gallery of the palace. Alfred Berner, director until 1975, largely succeeded in rebuilding the museum and in addition a comprehensive library focusing on organology.

In 1984, the museum moved to a Wisniewski-designed building at the Kemper Platz, next to the Berlin Philharmonic on the Kulturforum.

== Building ==
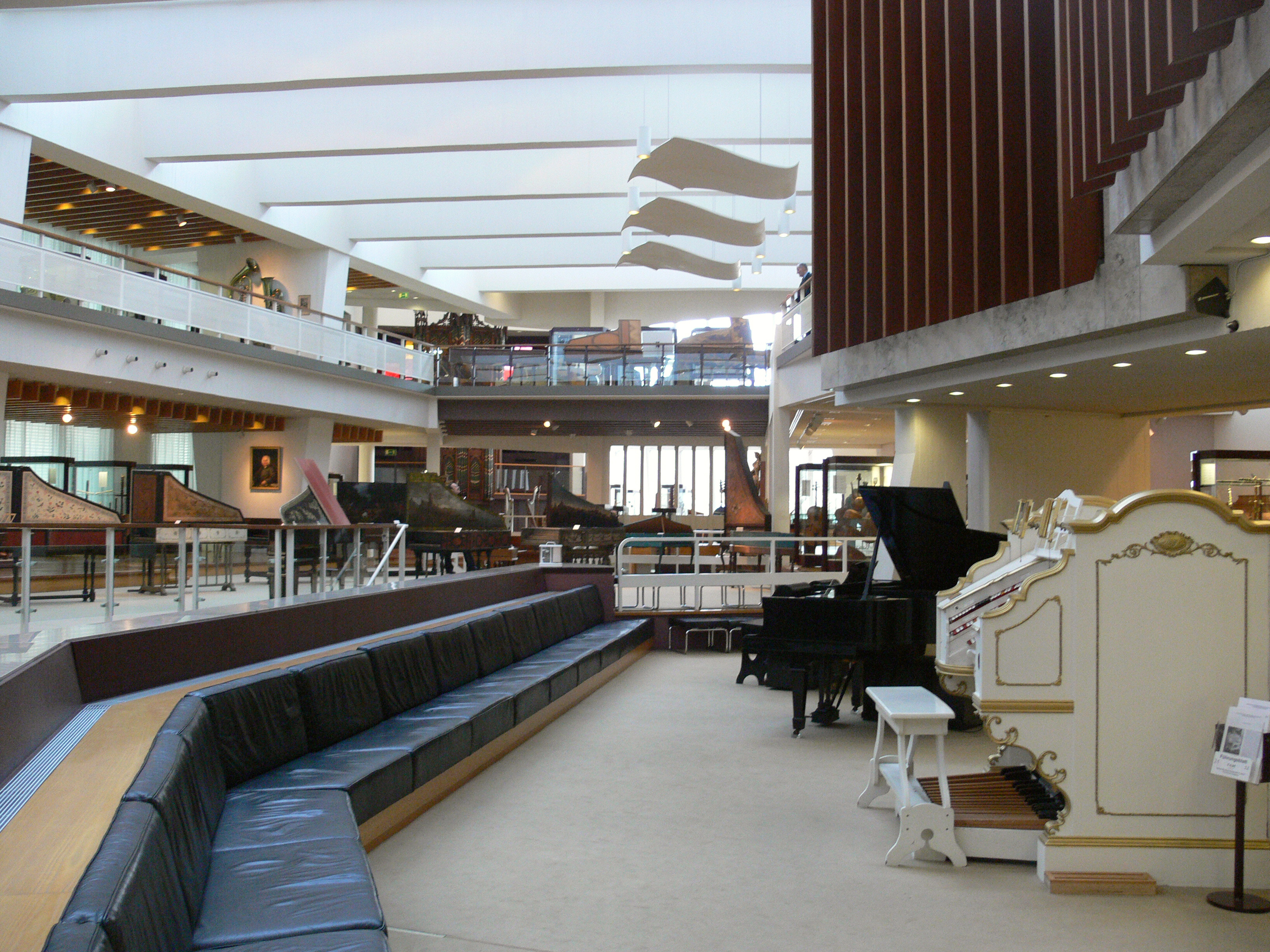
Interior

The Musical Instrument Museum (MIM) and the State Institute for Music Research (SIM) form a unit in Berlin. Their common building was constructed between 1979 and 1984 by Edgar Wisniewski after the designs of architect Hans Scharoun, who had died in 1972.

The museum is one of the few places where a theater organ can be heard live: the 1929 Mighty Wurlitzer organ (with 1228 pipes, 175 stops and 43 pistons). It had formerly been in the concert hall of Ferdinand Werner von Siemens's villa, the grandson of the Siemens founder. After the guided tour every Thursday after 6 pm and every Saturday at noon the instrument is played publicly. The museum also has its own concert hall, the Curt-Sachs-Saal, where chamber concerts take place regularly.

== Collection ==
- Keyboard Instruments
  - The "Bach Cembalo"
  - Fortepianos, virginals and clavichords
  - Bechstein upright pianos and grand piano
  - Ruckers Harpsichords from the first half of the 17th century
  - "Weber-Flügel": from Vienna workshop Joseph Brodmann, on this pianoforte Carl Maria von Weber composed his "Freischütz".
  - A Moór-Duplex piano
- Organs
  - The Mighty Wurlitzer Theater organ
  - Gray Organ: An English master instrument of the early 19th century.
- String Instruments
  - Master Violins by Antonio Stradivari, Amati and Guarneri.
  - Master Violins from the Northern Alpine region
  - Instruments of the Viennese Classical period
  - Möckel violins
- Wind Instruments
  - Flutes owned by Frederick the Great
  - Moritz brass
  - Naumburg Wind Instruments: from the Naumburg town church of St. Wenceslas.
  - Rare wind instruments from the Baroque period
- Automatic musical instruments: (music boxes, orchestrion)
- Electronic musical instruments: Hammond organ and Trautonium
- Glass Harmonica of Benjamin Franklin
- Musical Curiosities
  - Aeolian harp: A favorite of Goethe's
  - Arpeggione: An instrument-making experiment that would have been forgotten, had Franz Schubert not composed a Sonata for it
  - Sausage Bassoon and Bush Trumpet
  - Travel-harpsichord: a rarity at the Prussian Court

== Gallery ==
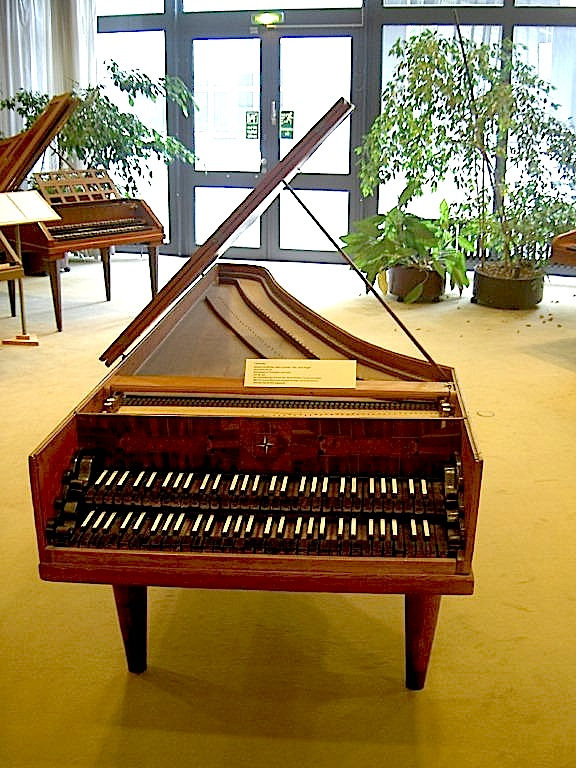
Harpsichord possibly used by J.S. Bach

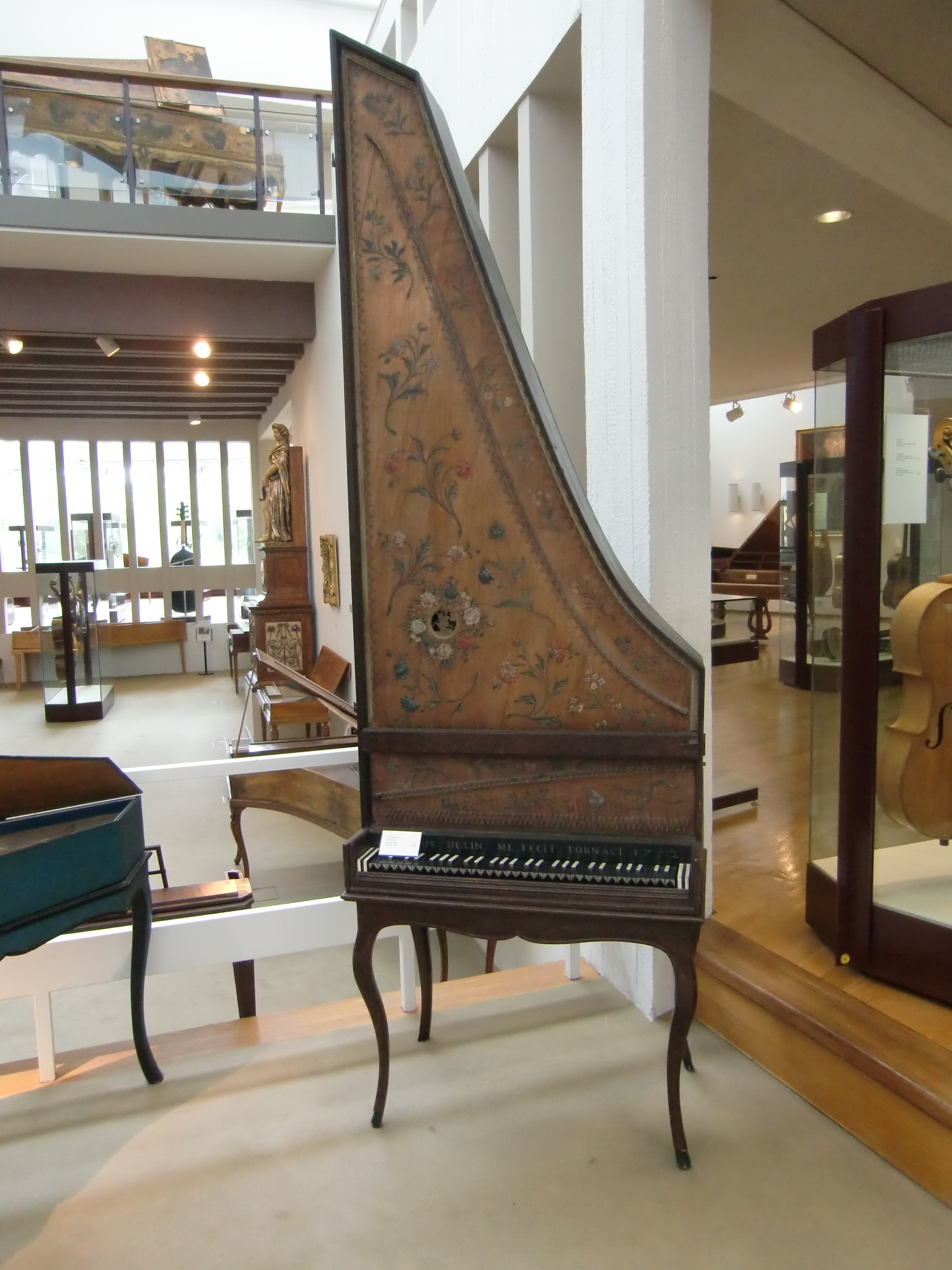
A clavicytherium by A. Delin

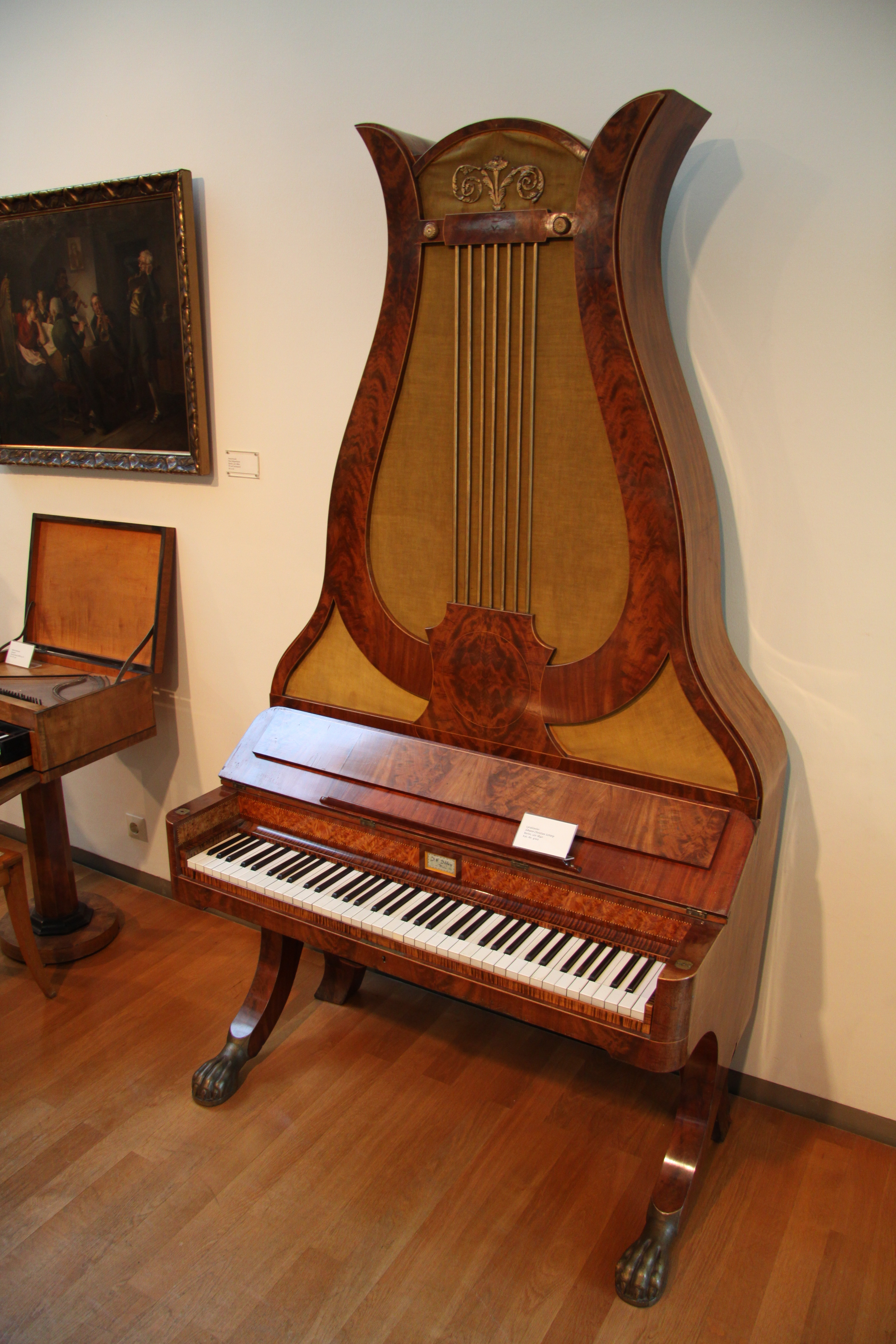
Lyre piano

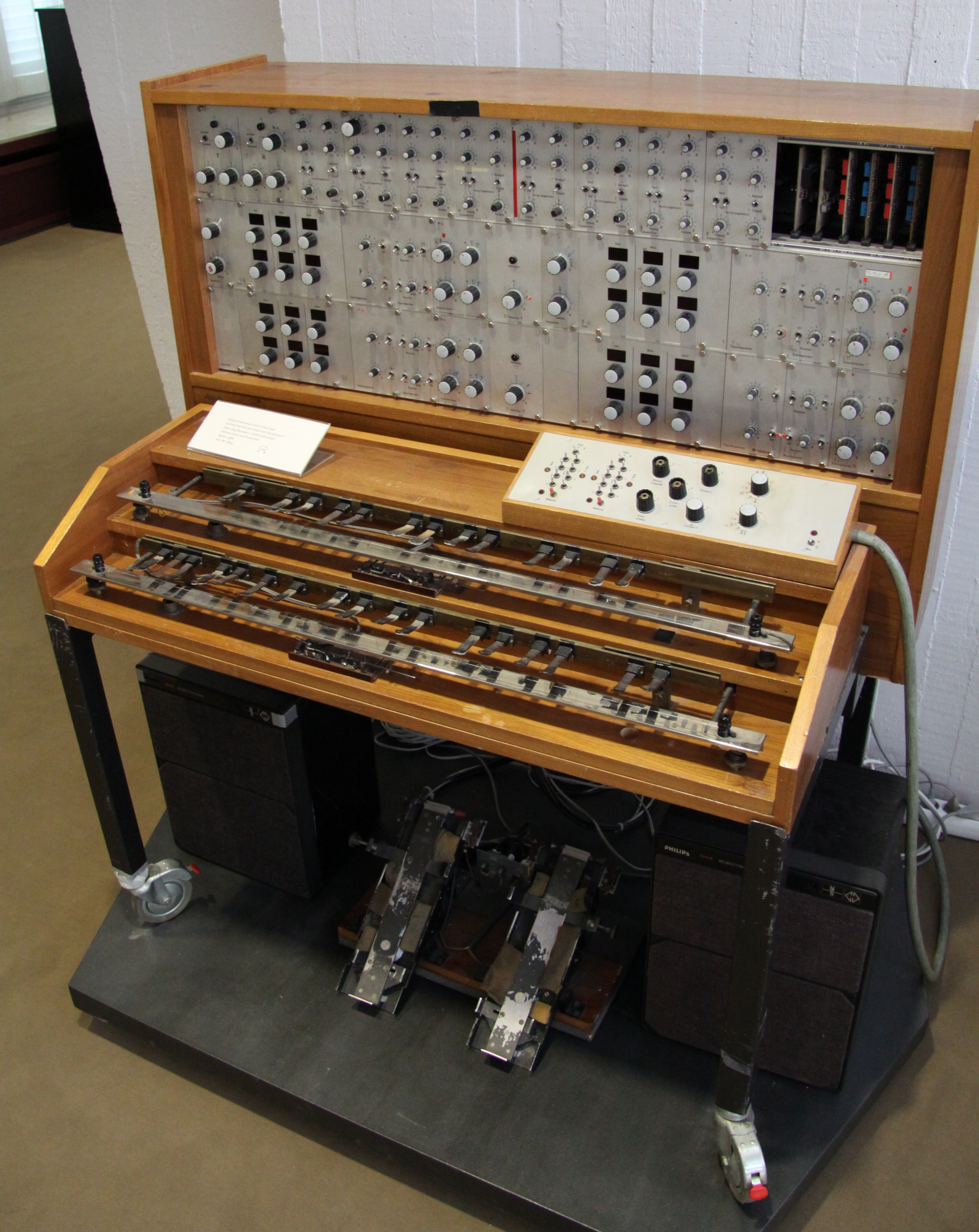
Mixtur-Trautonium

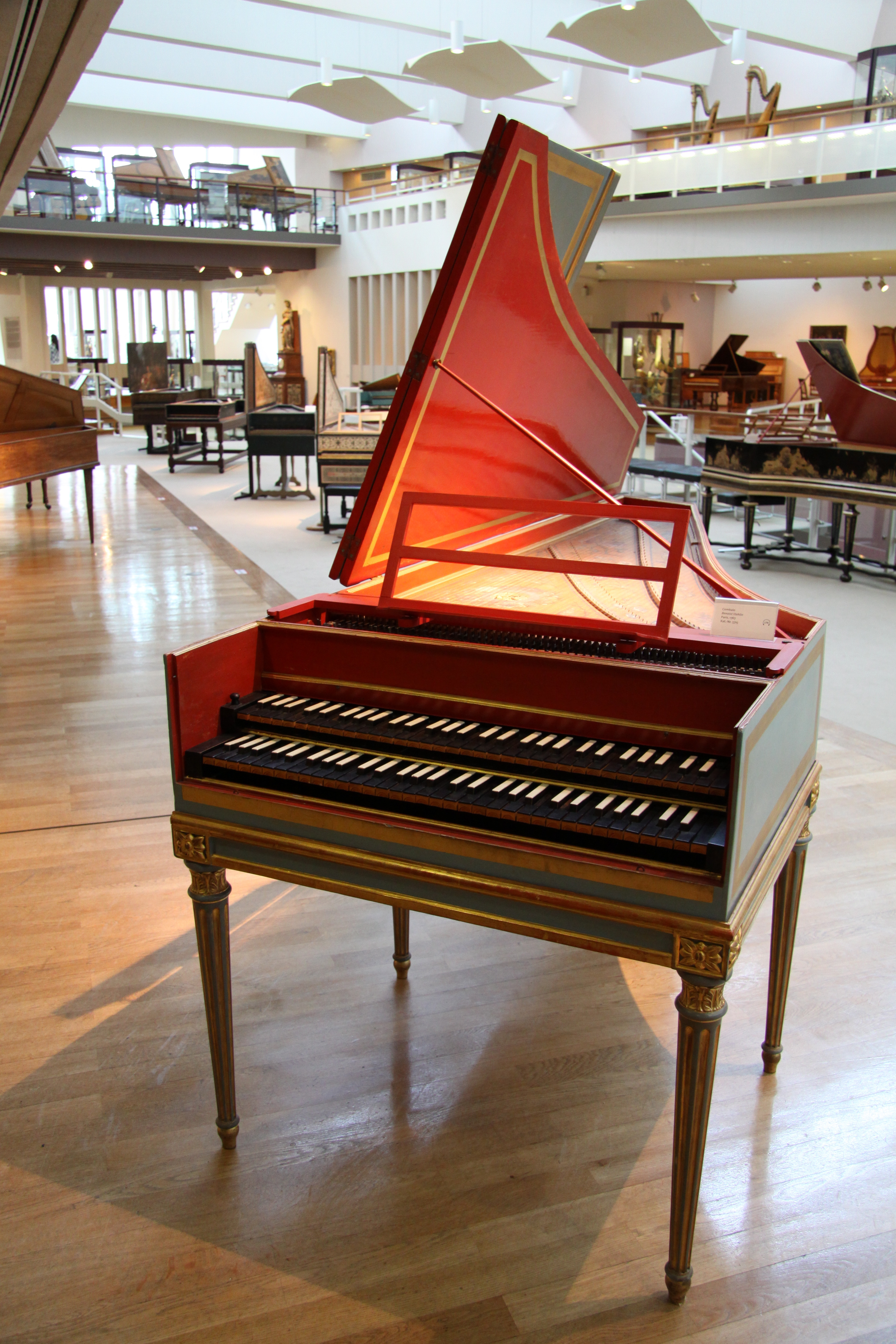
French harpsichord

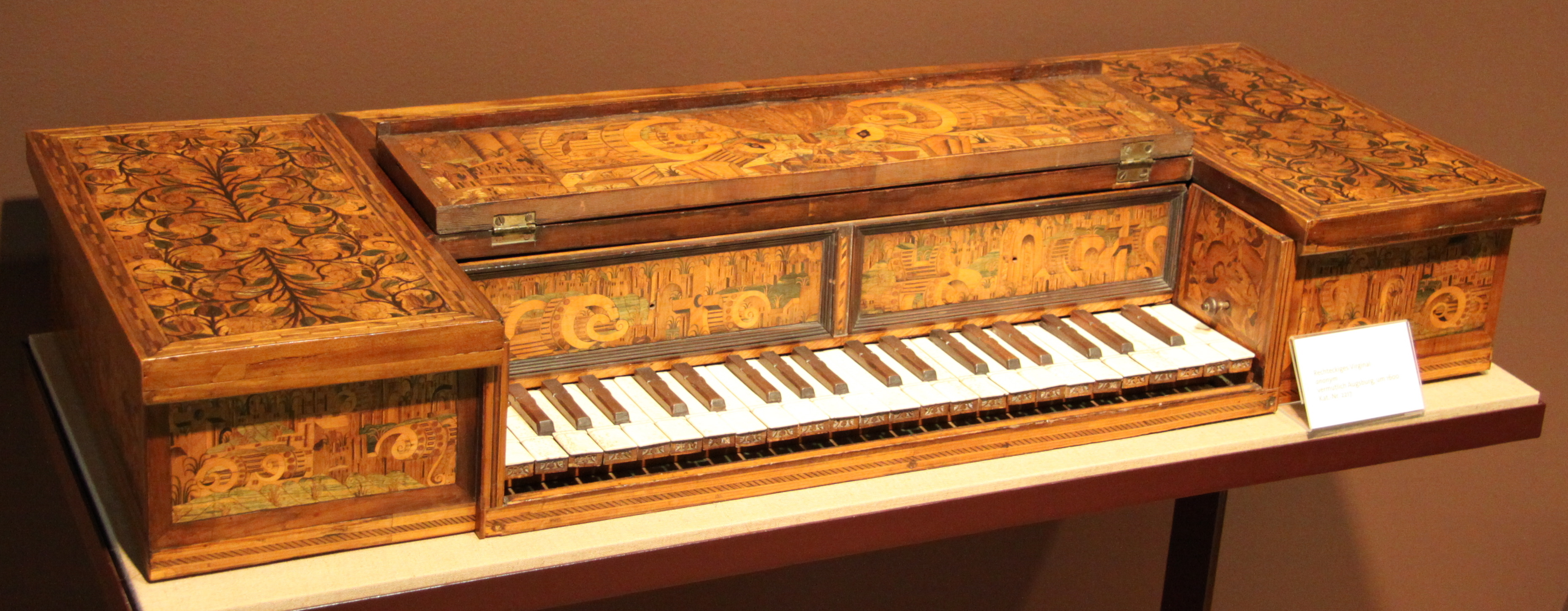
German virginal

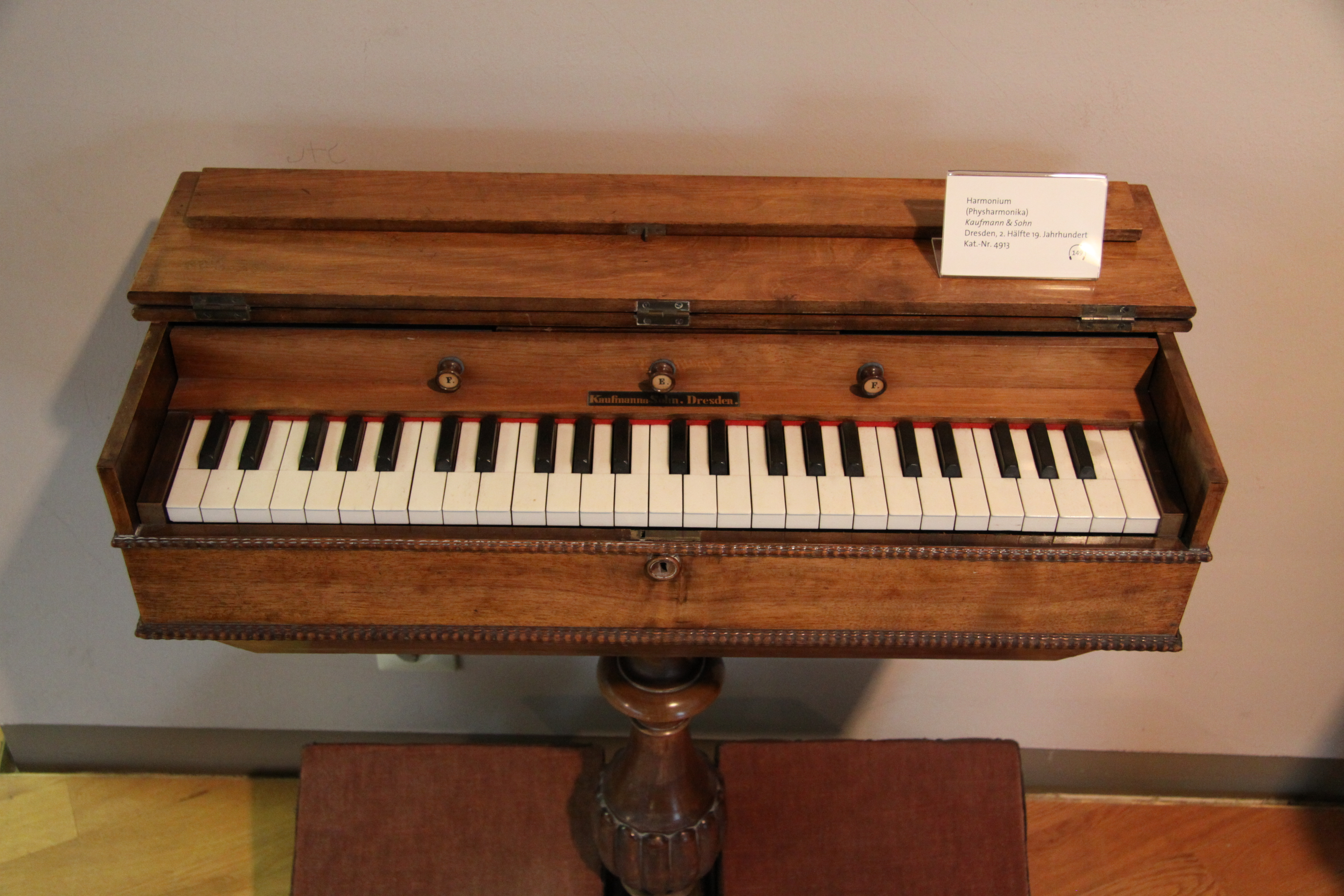
Harmonium

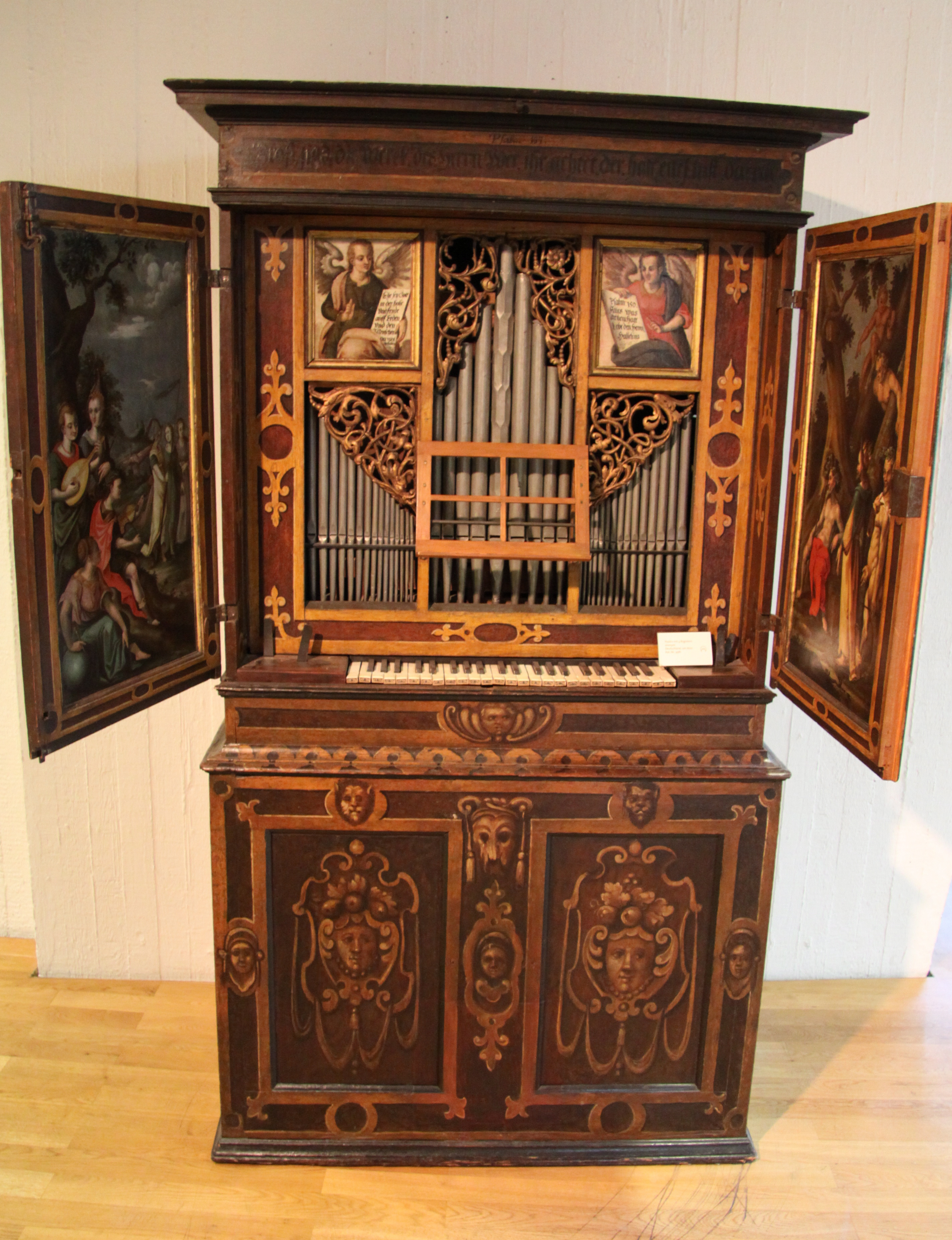
Organ

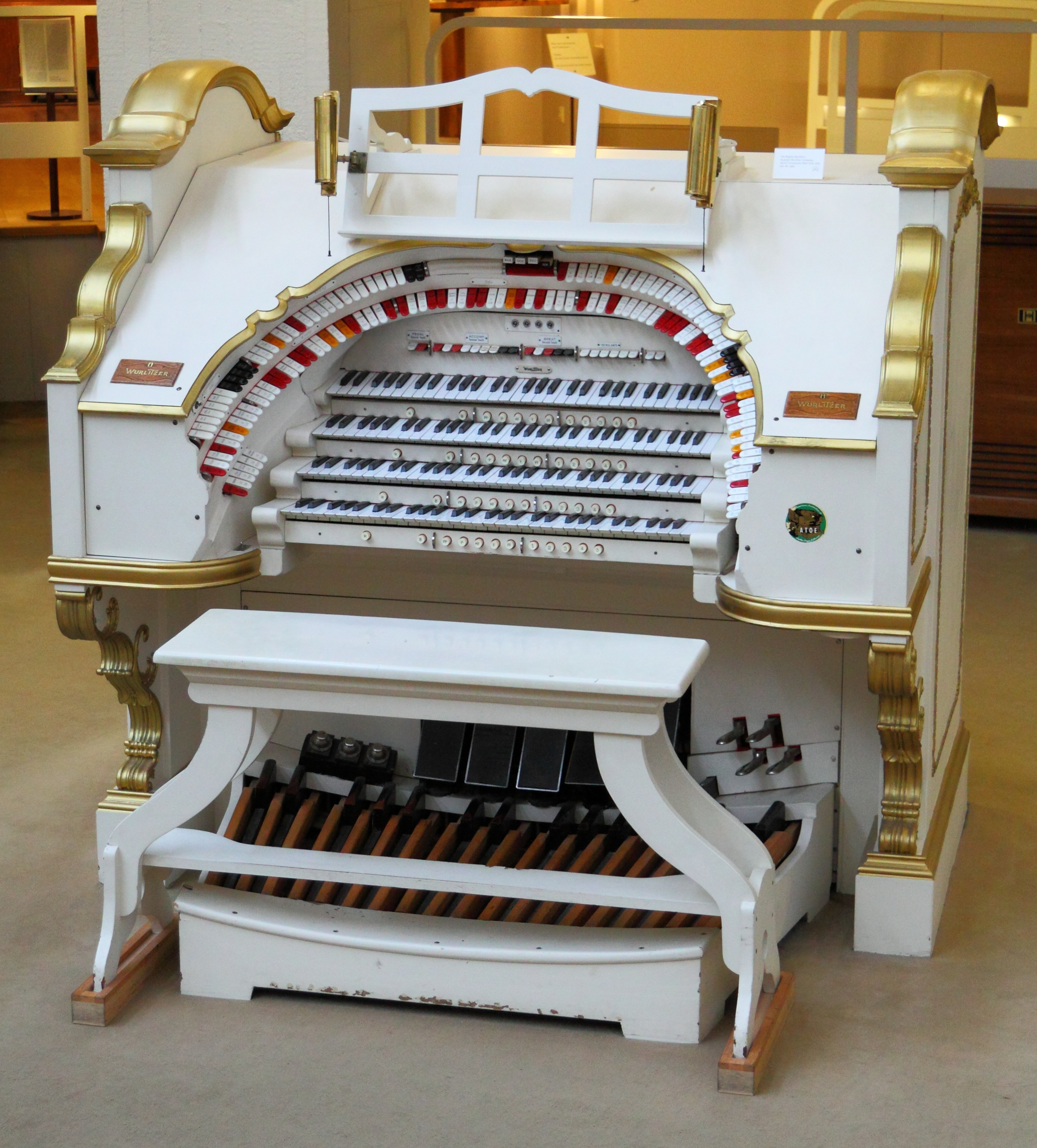
Mighty Wurlitzer

== See also ==
- List of music museums
