= Bundesstraße 96 =

Federal highway in Germany

B 96
- Bundesstraße 96

Route information
- Length: 520 km (320 mi)

Major junctions
- South end: Zittau
- North end: Sassnitz

Location
- Country: Germany
- States: Saxony, Brandenburg, Berlin, Mecklenburg-Vorpommern

Highway system
- Roads in Germany; Autobahns; List; Federal; List; State; E-roads

The Bundesstraße 96 (B 96) is a federal highway in Germany. It begins in Zittau in Saxony, close to the tripoint between Germany, Poland, and the Czech Republic, heads north through Berlin and ends in Sassnitz on the island of Rügen in the Baltic Sea. Some sections of B 96 form a part of the European route E22.

== History ==
Before the formation of East Germany, the highway was known as Reichsstraße 96.

The former F (Fernverkehrsstraße) 96 was the longest road in the GDR and a major route in north-south direction. When the Berlin Wall was built in 1961, the route of the F 96 was altered so that it went through Mahlow just south East Berlin and Birkenwerder just north of East Berlin. This section is now called B 96a. South of Berlin was the B 96 different from today's route at Klausdorf Mellensee (both now at the municipality Am Mellensee) because of a diversion around Wünsdorf and Zossen the site of the headquarters of the Supreme Command of the Group of Soviet Forces in Germany. In the 1960s and 1970s additions were made to the route between Greifswald and Stralsund to bypass narrow cobblestone village streets and a new parallel route to the west was built to transport tourists to the island of Rügen.

Due to historic and cultural similarities it became referred to as ostdeutsche "Route 66" by locals.

In 2015 the German rock band Silbermond dedicated a song to the road which passes through their hometown of Bautzen.

== Route ==
Starting from its southern end in Zittau, the road passes through Ebersbach, Bautzen, Hoyerswerda, Senftenberg, Großräschen, Finsterwalde, Luckau, Zossen, and enters Berlin's Lichtenrade quarter. In Berlin, the road runs in the north-south direction through the German capital, among others as Lichtenrader Damm, Mariendorfer Damm, Tempelhofer Damm, Mehringdamm, Hallesches Ufer, Tempelhofer Ufer, Heidestraße, Fennstraße, Reinickendorfer Straße, Markstraße, Residenzstraße, Roedernallee, Oranienburger Straße. On 26 March 2006 part of the route was redirected with the opening of the Tunnel Tiergarten Spreebogen, connecting Reichpietschufer with Minna-Cauer-Straße passing under the central quarters of Potsdamer Platz and the government district.

North of Berlin, the road passes through Glienicke/Nordbahn, Oranienburg, Fürstenberg/Havel, Neustrelitz and Neubrandenburg. Between Neubrandenburg-east and Süderholz, the B96 is replaced by the Bundesautobahn 20. From there, it continues through Stralsund, where it crosses over the Rügenbrücke to the island Rügen. It passes through Samtens and Bergen auf Rügen, and ends in Sassnitz.

Although it is now also partly rebuilt as the A20 Highway with interchange north of Greifswald it is still one of the major highways in Germany.

== See also ==
- Bundesstraße
- List of federal highways in Germany
