= Edgar Wisniewski =

German architect

- Born: 4 September 1930; Stolp, Farther Pomerania, Weimar Germany
- Died: 25 April 2007 (aged 76); Berlin, Germany
- Resting place: Waldfriedhof Zehlendorf
- Education: Technische Universität Berlin
- Occupation: Architect

Edgar Wisniewski (4 September 1930, in Stolp, Germany (now Słupsk, Poland) – 25 April 2007, in Berlin) was a German architect. He was a student and later business partner of Hans Scharoun.

== Life ==
Wisniewski was born in 1930 as the younger of two children (his sister Roswitha Wisniewski was born in 1926) to architect Bruno Wisniewski and pianist Edith Wisniewski (née Berndt) in Stolp. After World War II and the subsequent expulsion of Germans from Poland, the family escaped to Berlin in September 1945. His interest in music and architecture developed at home with his parents. He justified his decision to undertake architectural studies as a "more rational solution, because architecture seemed to me less of a professional risk than music."

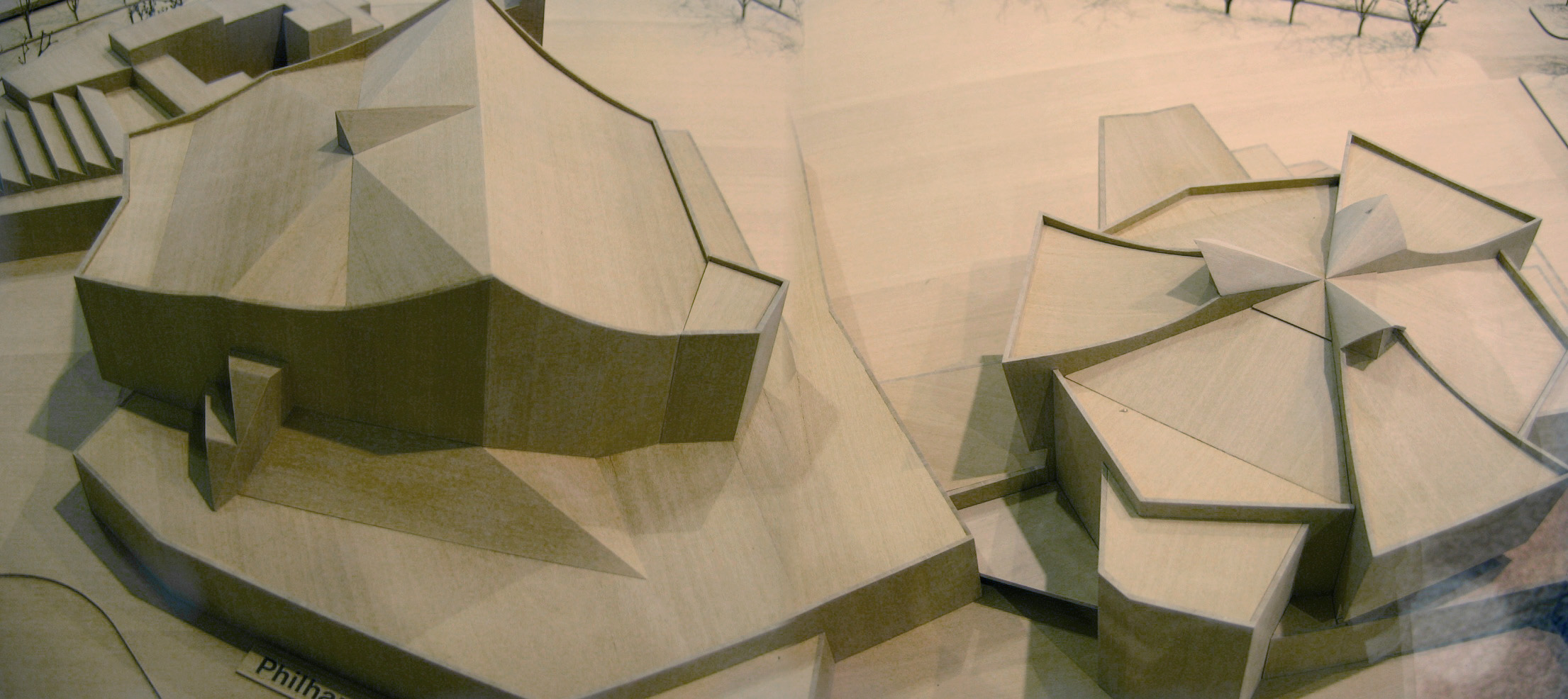
Model of the Philharmonie (left) and Kammermusiksaal (right)

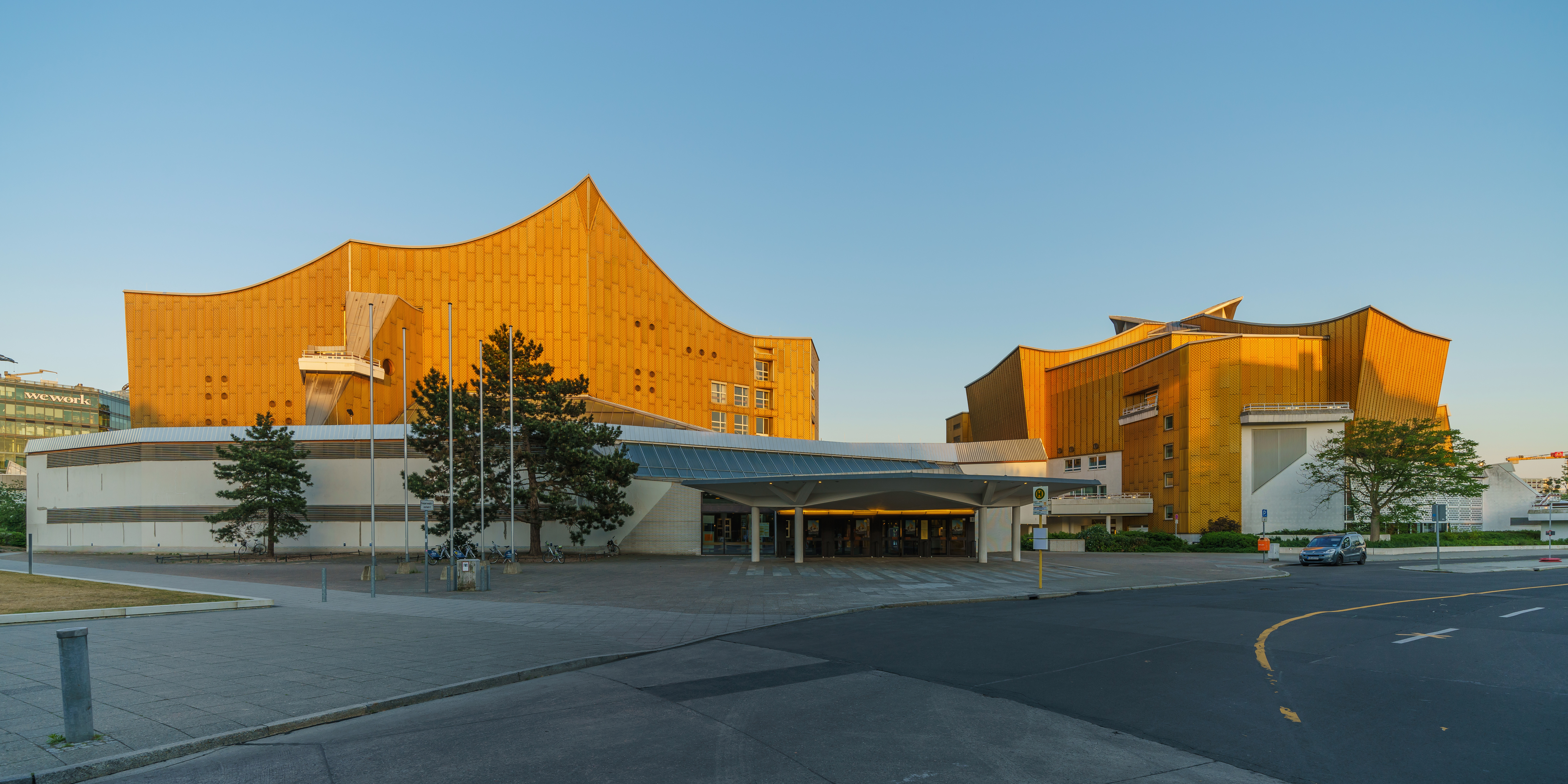
Kammermusiksaal (right) and Philharmonie in Berlin

Wisniewski studied from 1950 to 1957 at Technische Universität Berlin with Hans Scharoun, afterwards becoming his colleague and, later, business partner. He was involved from the beginning in the planning of the urban regeneration project of the Kulturforum in Berlin. In 1963, the Berliner Philharmonie was the first building to be completed, and Wisniewski was the lead partner for this. It was followed in 1978 by the opening of the Berlin State Library. During the planning phase in 1972, Scharoun died. There was a contractual agreement between Wisniewski and Scharoun which said that in the event of the death of one or other partner, the remaining partner would continue the work.

From 1979 to 1984 the State Institute for Music Research and the Berlin Musical Instrument Museum were established. Wisniewski planned and realised the Berlin chamber music hall between 1984 and 1987 following Scharoun's original project sketches. Until then, many years of debate had taken place in the State Parliament House of Berlin until Richard von Weizsäcker, as the mayor, finally reached a decision for the construction. In addition to the central theme of "Music in the Centre", Wisniewski was particularly interested in the architectural requirements for the performance of contemporary music, e.g., through the use of mezzanine spaces for chamber music. For this he consulted with composers such as Luigi Nono, who also wrote works for the building and the possibilities it offered. The outstanding acoustics of the hall have been praised by numerous ensembles and conductors worldwide.

The fall of the Berlin Wall, which was in the immediate vicinity of the Kulturforum, and the reconstruction of the Potsdamer Platz, completely changed the overall urban building context in Berlin. A number of Scharoun's original designs were never realised a result, including the Senate guest-house for artists, which was part of the competition for the construction of the state library. Nevertheless, Wisniewski continued until the end to complete his overall concept, which had many critics since the beginning and triggered numerous debates.

In addition to his work for the Berlin Kulturforum, Wisniewski also developed housing projects. In the late 1970s, he planned a terrace house group in Berlin-Schlachtensee (Kirchblick 12a-c), where Wisniewski and his family themselves lived.

After Reunification, Wisniewski planned the reconstruction and development along organic principles of post-war prefabricated buildings in the former GDR, especially in Prenzlau. Extensive plans for Neubrandenburg, however, were not realised.

== Honors ==
- 1997 Officer's Cross of the Order of Merit of the Federal Republic of Germany

== Literature ==
- Wisniewski, Edgar (1993). Die Berliner Philharmonie und ihr Kammermusiksaal (in German). Berlin: Gebr. Mann Verlag. ISBN 3-7861-1714-4.
- —— (1984). "Ratio und Kontemplation. Ein neuer Bau für die Musik im Kulturforum". Wege zur Musik, hrsg. anlässlich der Eröffnung des neuen Hauses [zum 14. Dezember 1984] (in German). Berlin: Staatliches Institut für Musikforschung Preußischer Kulturbesitz. ISBN 3-922378-04-8.
