= Kemperplatz =

Square in Berlin, Germany

Coordinates: 52.5114°N 13.3711°E

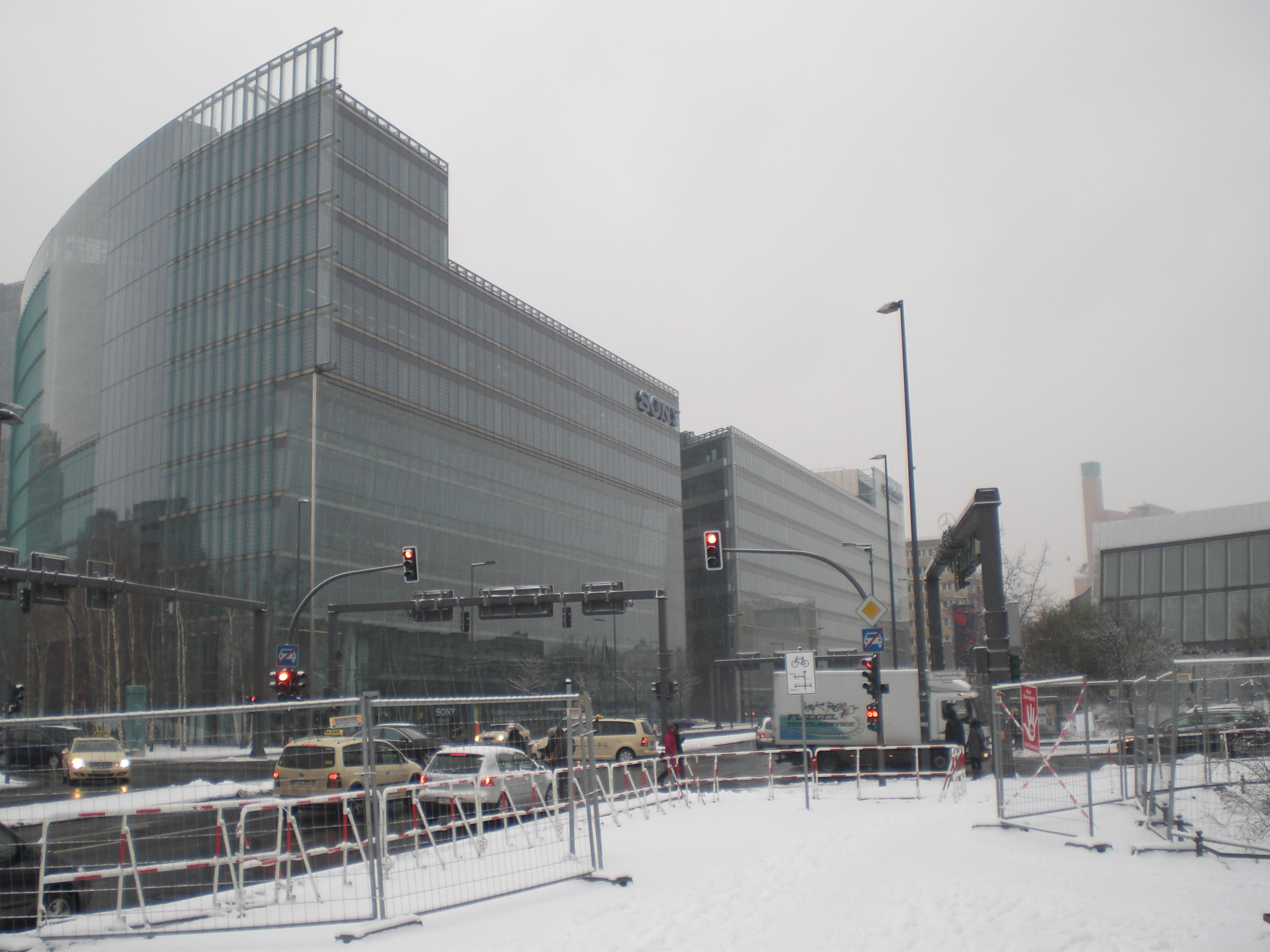
Kemperplatz in winter

Kemperplatz is situated in the Tiergarten subdivision of the Mitte district in Berlin, Germany. It leads to Lennéstraße, Ben-Gurion-Straße, Tiergartenstraße, and connects to the Tiergarten Spreebogen Tunnel.

== History ==
Kemperplatz was given its name in 1858 after Johan Wilhelm Kemper (1766–1840), the operator of the bar Kempers Hof. The place became popular with the founding of the Architects Association of Berlin in 1824 in Kempers bar. The Lawless Society of Berlin, created by the editor and philologist Philip Karl Buttmann (1764–1829), also held meetings here. After the Nazi regime seized power in 1933, the name of the square was changed to Skagerrakplatz taking its name from the battle of Jutland (Skagerrakschlacht in German) which took place during the First World War. The square regained its original name on 25 October 1946.

The naming of the place coincided with the building of enormous villas by rich Berliners in the 19th century, thus creating the Tiergarten district of Berlin. Some notable Berliners included the actor and artistic director August Wilhelm Iffland, whose house was built in the middle of the forest in 1800.

In 1877, the late-classical Wrangelbrunnen was installed at the Kemperplatz. The fountain which is now located at the corner of Urbanstraße and Grimmstraße in the Berlin district of Kreuzberg had to be relocated to make way for the Rolandbrunnen in 1902. With its new monumental fountain installation, the Kemperplatz of Wilhelmine Berlin formed the end of the southern part of the Siegesalle in the Großer Tiergarten. The Rolandbrunnen was heavily damaged during World War II and was completely dismantled in 1950.

== Today ==
Kemperplatz is known for being the location of the Berliner Philharmonie. It is considered the most important concert hall in Berlin with the concert hall situated on the Gendarmenmarkt and is home to the Berlin Philharmonic. The building of the Philharmonic began in the 1960s with the development of the Kulturband Idea which planned for a loose grouping of cultural installations on the spot of the Kemperplatz. For this, all historic buildings along with their foundations were demolished, even the street layout was changed.

Between 1984 and 1991, the Kemperplatz was the northern terminal station of the M-Bahn test track. In 2000, the seven buildings of the Sony Center were completed in the area between Potsdamer Platz, Kemperplatz and Ben-Gurion-Straße. The European headquarters of Sony is located at the north-west point of the complex.

== Sources ==
This article was translated from the German article Kemperplatz.
