= Tiergartenstraße =

Street in Berlin, Germany

- Tiergartenstrasse
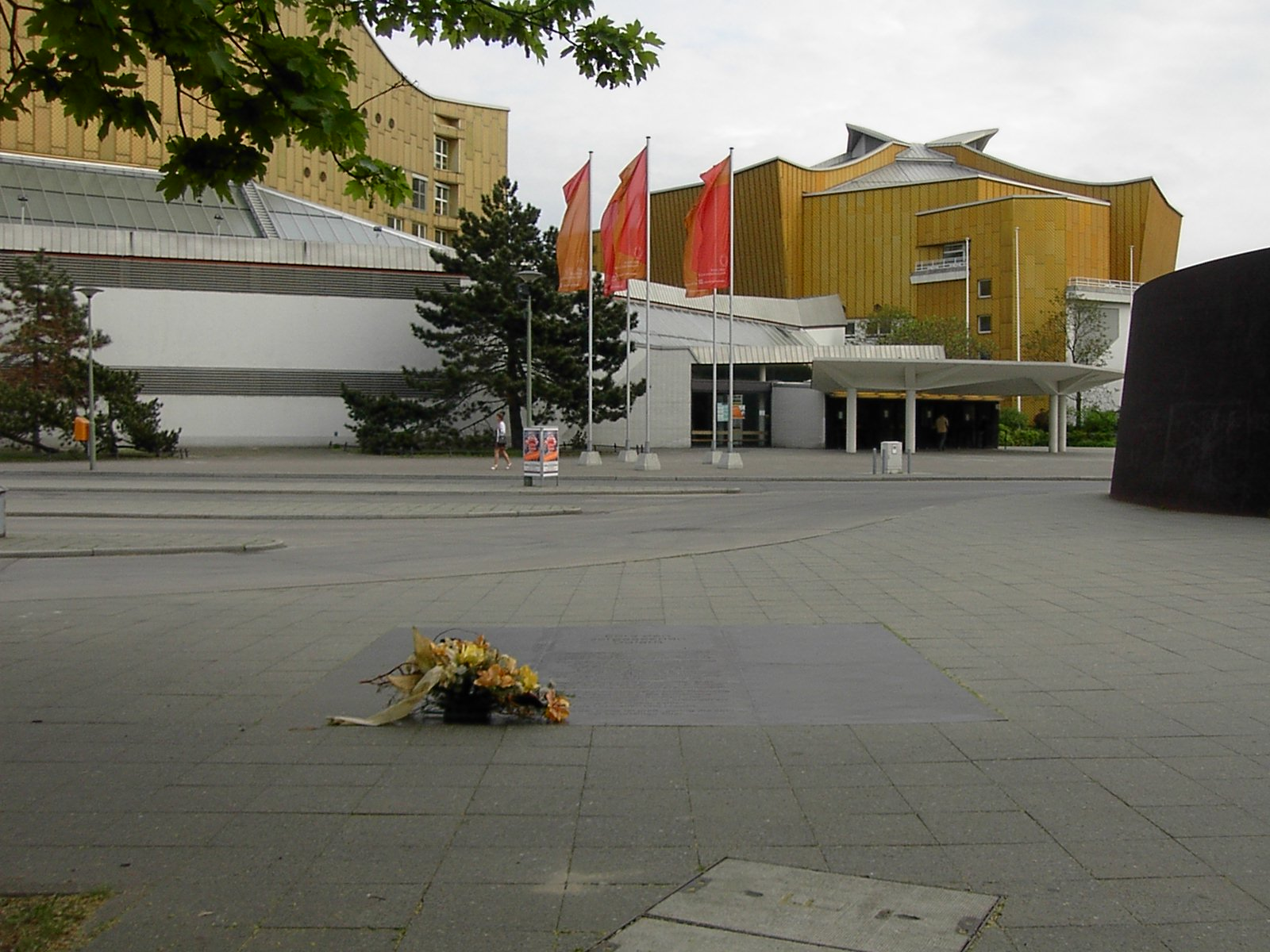
- Bus terminal at the Philharmonie, in the foreground a plaque is set into the pavement to commemorate the victims of Aktion T4
- Interactive map of Tiergartenstraße
- Former names: Kanonenweg; (18th century–1831)
- Namesake: Großer Tiergarten
- Type: Street
- Location: Berlin, Germany
- Quarter: Tiergarten
- Nearest metro station: Potsdamer Platz
- Coordinates: 52°30′35″N 13°21′40″E
- East end: Lennéstraße; Kemperplatz; Tiergarten Spreebogen Tunnel; Ben-Gurion-Straße
- Major junctions: Herbert-von-Karajan-Straße; Stauffenbergstraße; Hildebrandstraße; Hiroshimastraße; Clara-Wieck-Straße
- West end: Helmut-Kohl-Allee; Klingelhöferstraße; Stülerstraße

Tiergartenstraße, or Tiergartenstrasse (see ß), is a street in the Tiergarten district in central Berlin, the capital of Germany. The street runs east-west along the southern edge of the Großer Tiergarten park from Kemperplatz and Ben-Gurion-Straße near Sony Center and Potsdamer Platz in the east to the intersection of Helmut-Kohl-Allee and Klingelhöferstraße in the west. On the street’s southern side, the street intersects with (from east to west), Herbert-von-Karajan-Straße, Stauffenbergstraße, Hildebrandstraße, Hiroshimastraße and Clara-Wieck-Straße.

The neighbourhood was incorporated into the City of Berlin in 1861, soon after the 1871 Unification of Germany it developed into an affluent residential area and later into the capital's diplomatic quarter.

== Notable sights ==
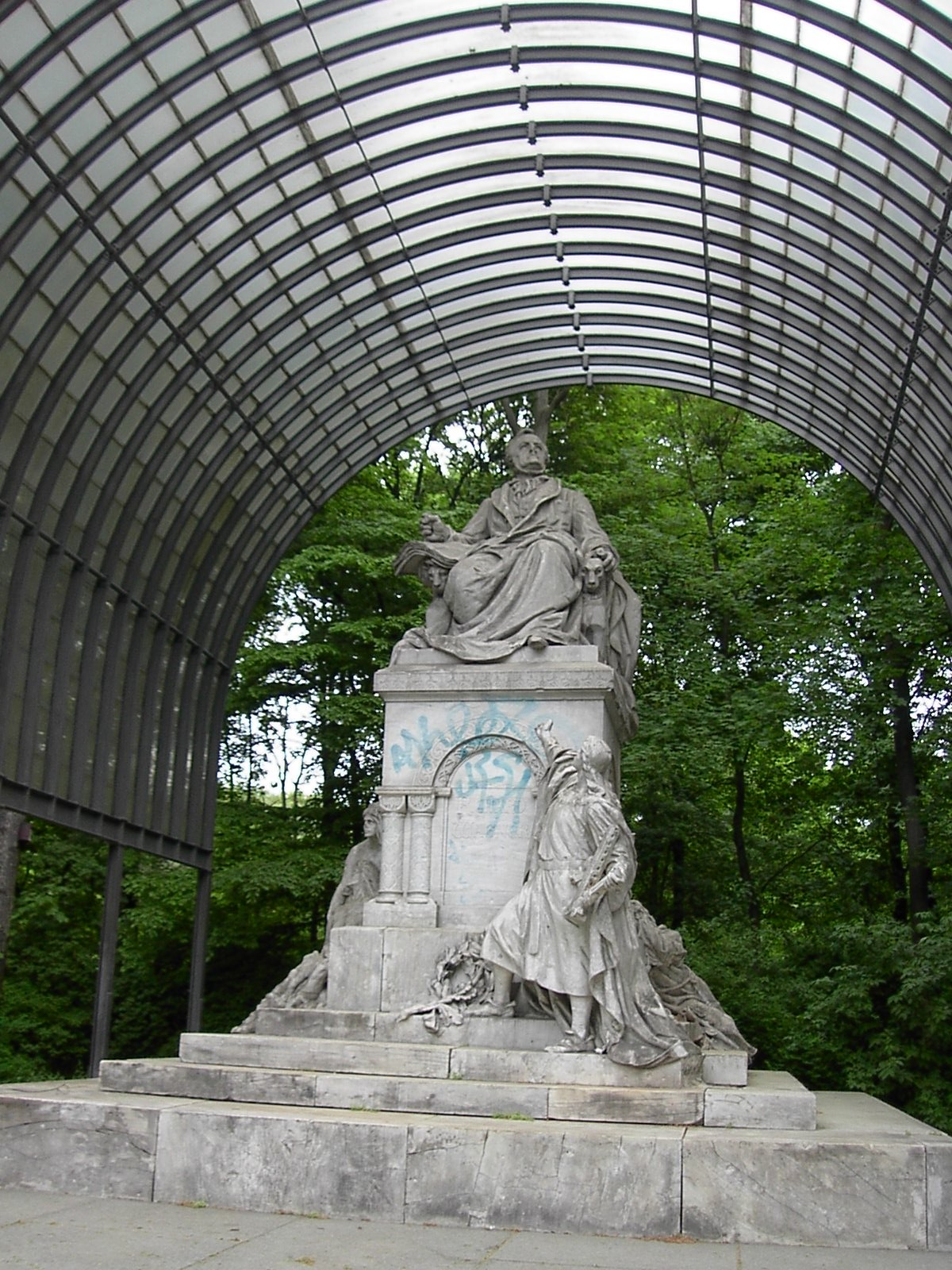
The statue of Richard Wagner

The Kemperplatz at the eastern end formerly marked the starting point of the Siegesallee boulevard running northwards through the park to Königsplatz in front of the Reichstag. On Tiergartenstaße No. 1 is the Berlin Musical Instrument Museum and the adjacent building of the Berliner Philharmonie behind it, a major centre for musical performances.

On the western corner on Tiergartenstraße No. 6 is the Berlin Museum of Applied Art and next to it the Berlin Art Library, both part of the Kulturforum cluster of the Berlin State Museums. On the intersection with Stauffenbergstraße on No. 12 is the Austrian embassy, erected in 2001 according to plans designed by Hans Hollein. Further diplomatic missions follow: the Indian (Embassy of India, Berlin) South African embassies (on No. 18), the Turkian (Embassy of Turkey, Berlin) as well as the Italian and Japanese representations at the corner of Hiroshimastraße, both as former Axis powers located at vast buildings from about 1941/42 that have been reconstructed after World War II. A number of other embassies are located along nearby streets.

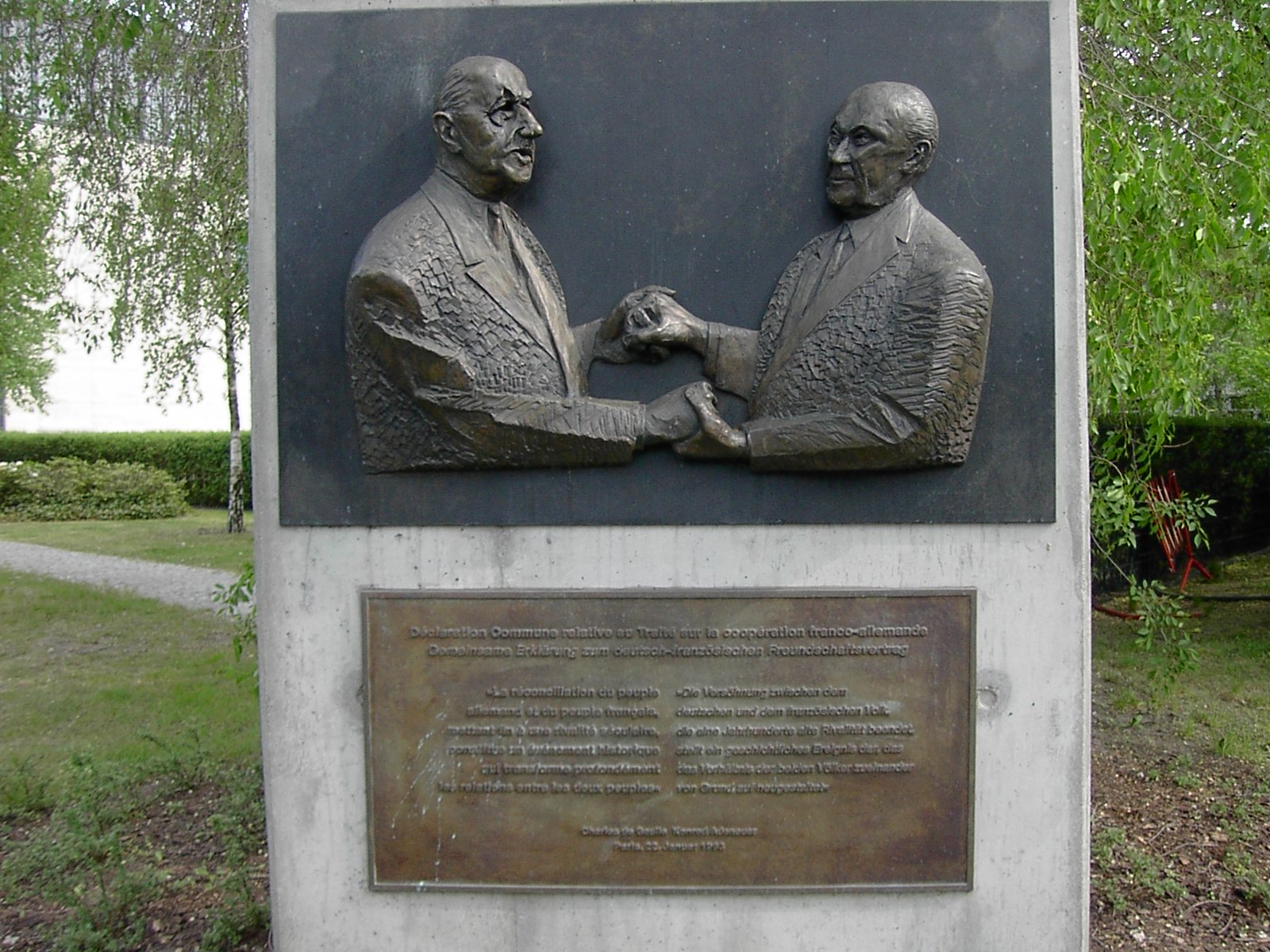
Sculpture of Charles de Gaulle and Konrad Adenauer

At the western end of Tiergartenstraße are the Jesuit Canisius-Kolleg gymnasium in the building of the former Krupp representative office on No. 30, the Saudi Arabian embassy and finally the offices of the Christian Democratic Konrad Adenauer Foundation. On the corner of Klingelhöferstraße is a sculpture depicting Konrad Adenauer and Charles de Gaulle shaking hands, symbolising their role in overcoming the centuries-long French–German enmity and laying the groundwork for the Franco–German Friendship after World War II.

On the north side of Tiergartenstraße just west of Stauffenbergstraße is a large seated statue of the composer Richard Wagner in the Tiergarten park. A glass canopy has been erected over the statue to protect it from the elements.

== Tiergartenstraße No. 4 ==
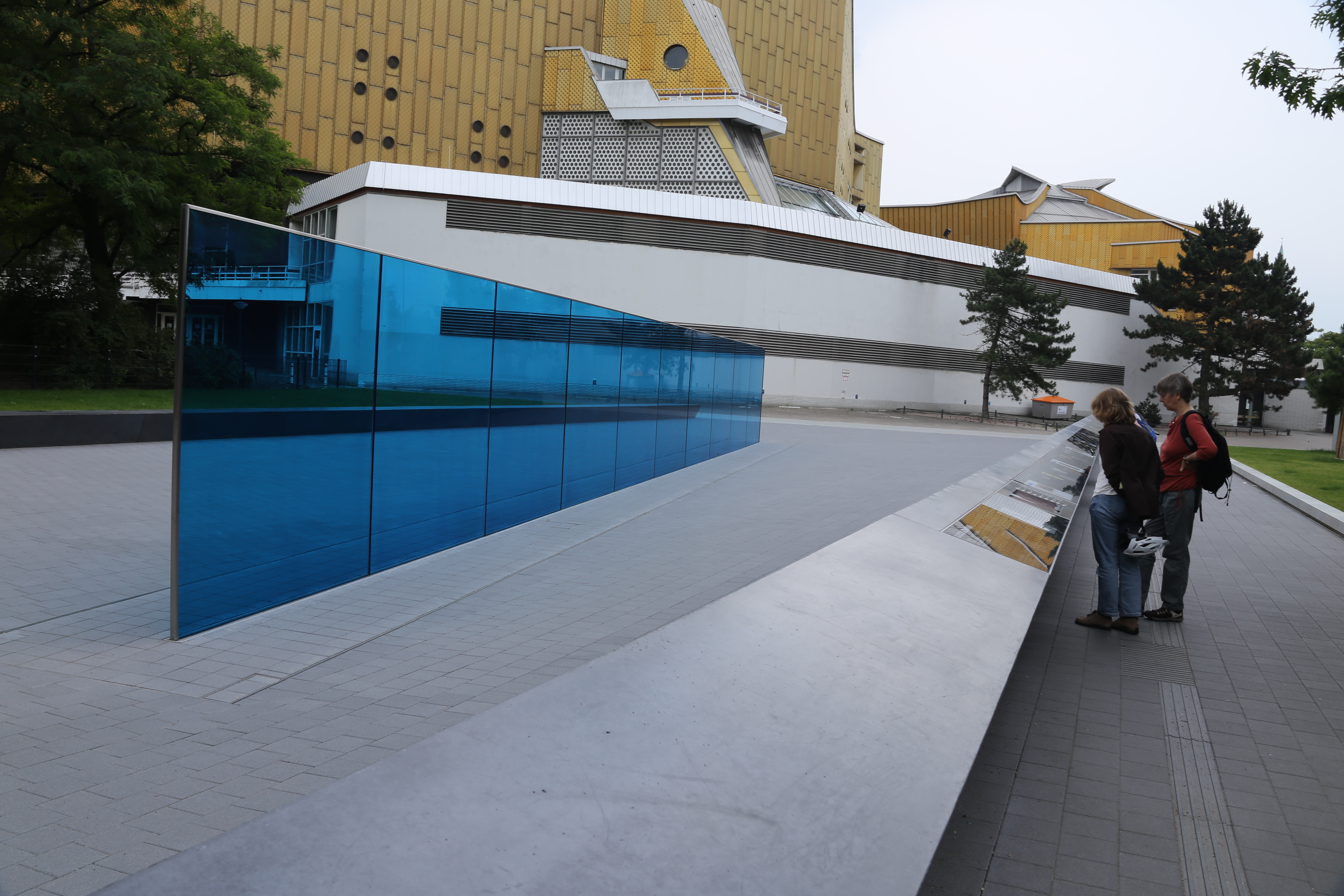
Aktion T4 memorial at Tiergartenstraße 4

The bus terminal at the corner Herbert-von-Karajan-Straße was formerly the site of the villa Tiergartenstraße No. 4, the headquarters of the Nazi "euthanasia" program (the mass murder of disabled people and others), codenamed Aktion T4 in reference to this address. Although the building from which this program was administered no longer exists, a monument by Richard Serra and a plaque set into the pavement commemorates its estimated 200,000 victims.

On September 1, 2014, the victims of the direct medical killings by the Nazis were given their own memorial, consisting of a 24-metre-long (79 ft) wall of blue tinted glass. The memorial was designed by architects Ursula Wilms and Heinz Hallmann, and artist Nikolaus Koliusis.
