= Albert Delin =

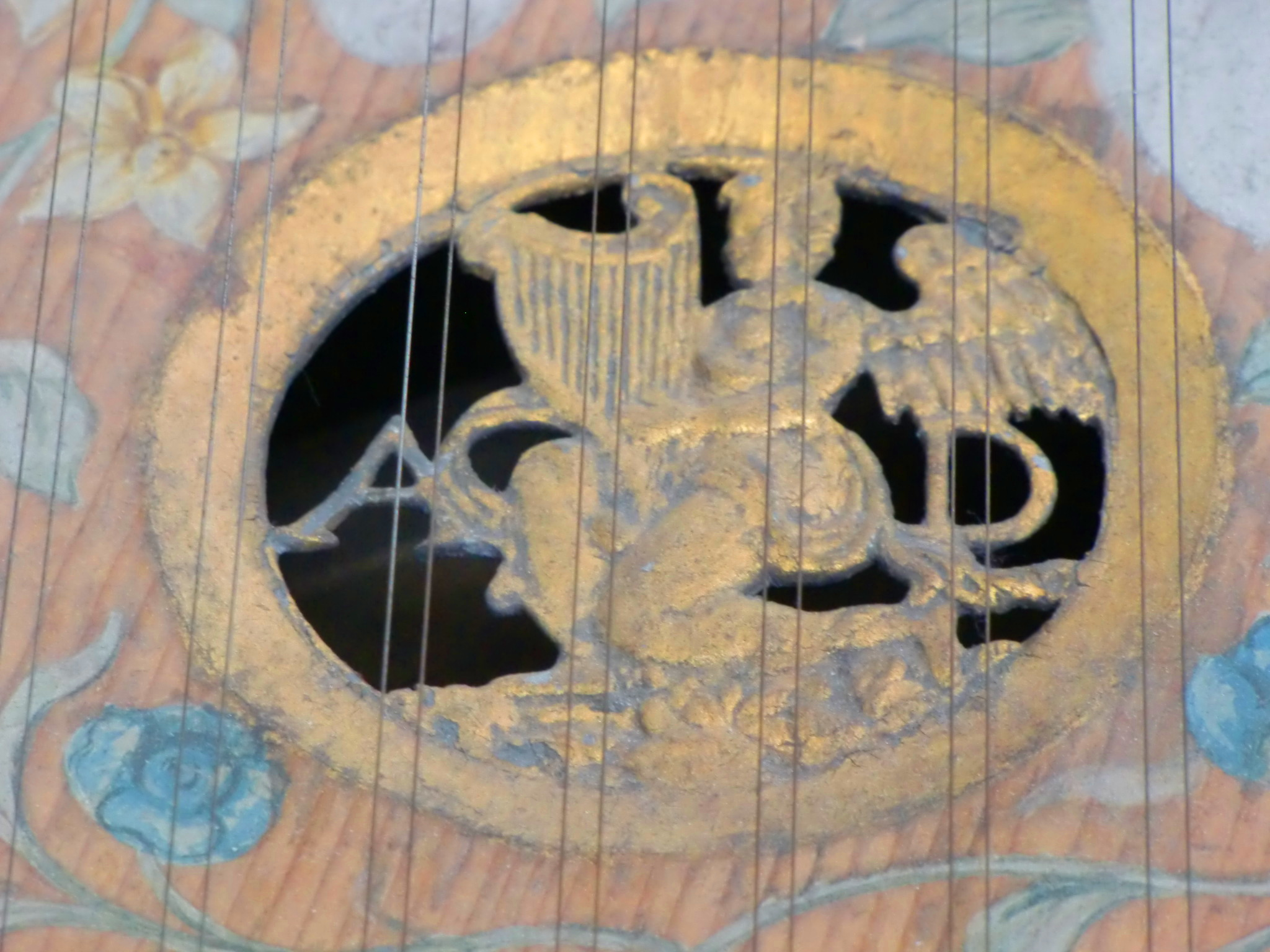
The rose of a 1750 harpsichord by Albert Delin, now preserved in Berlin

Albert Delin (17 April 1712, Ath – 26 November 1771, Tournai; also known as Albertus Delin) was a harpsichord maker in the Austrian Netherlands.

== Biography ==
Born in Ath in Southern Netherlands (now in Belgium), he soon moved to the nearby town of Tournai to practice his trade. Little is known of his training but a remarkable number of his instruments have survived. His building style is quite contrary to his more famous contemporaries, like his neighbours Dulckens in Antwerp, the Hass family in Hamburg or the Taskins of Paris, that at the time created complex machines with an extensive variety of registers and knee levers. Delin's surviving instruments are simple, reminiscent of the old Ruckers instruments of a century before and of good workmanship as witnessed by the number of surviving instruments.

== Surviving instruments ==
- Two surviving harpsichords (1750 and 1768), both have a single manual and have only two 8' choirs and a buff stop, with all battens protruding through the instruments side, similar to original Ruckers instruments.
- Kottick mentions four bentside spinets (1763, 1765, 1766, 1770), all with a single 8' choir. A colorful fifth bentside spinet signed "A.D. 1738" and bearing a rose with the initials AD, has been attributed to him as well.
- Three clavicytheria (1751, 1752, 1760), strung like his harpsichords with two 8' registers, and guidebattens protruding through the cheek. The clavicytheria have an elegant pivot mechanism of Delins' own design, needing no spring action and only gravity for the return. Chung describes Delins clavicytherium thus: "[he] succeeded in overcoming the difficulties of building an upright harpsichord better than any other builder. His three instruments, which are considered by many to be the finest of all surviving clavicytheria, have an amazingly fine touch that is achieved by a special action that upon the release of the keys allows the jacks to return without the need of springs or additional weights."
- The last surviving instrument is even more old fashioned than the rest, a small, hexagonal, octave spinet (1750).

== Decor of the instruments ==
Delin's original case decor seems to have been simple, but some of his instruments later received "makeovers". Most notably his 1760 clavicytherium, was retrofitted with an extravagant gilded, rococo door. The 1738 spinet is elaborately painted with a forest scene on the inside of the lid, while the case is covered with a menagerie of monkeys playing musical instruments.

The soundboard paintings in Delin's instruments are typical Flemish floral motifs, with visible outlines, flat coloring and little detail, a style similar to the Ruckers.

== Bibliography ==
J. Tournay, "À propos d’Albertus Delin (1712-1771). Petite contribution à l'histoire du clavecin", in La facture de clavecin du XVe au XVIIIe siècle, Louvain-la-Neuve, 1976, pp. 139–232.

J. Tournay, "The Double Orientation in Harpsichord Building in the Low Countries in the Eighteenth Century", in The Harpsichord and its Repertoire, Utrecht, 1990, pp. 21–45.

== Image gallery ==
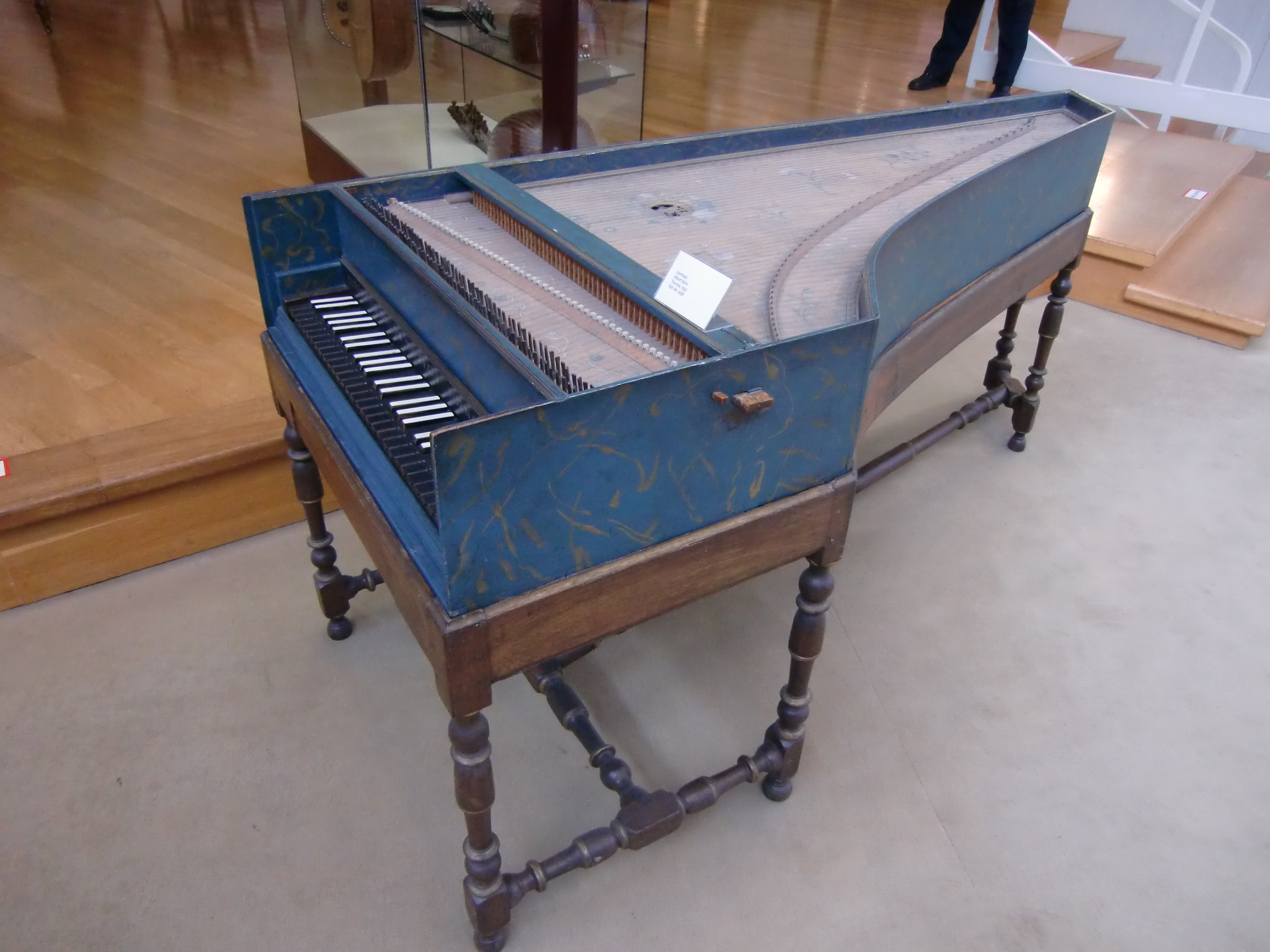
The 1750 harpsichord in the musical instrument museum in Berlin

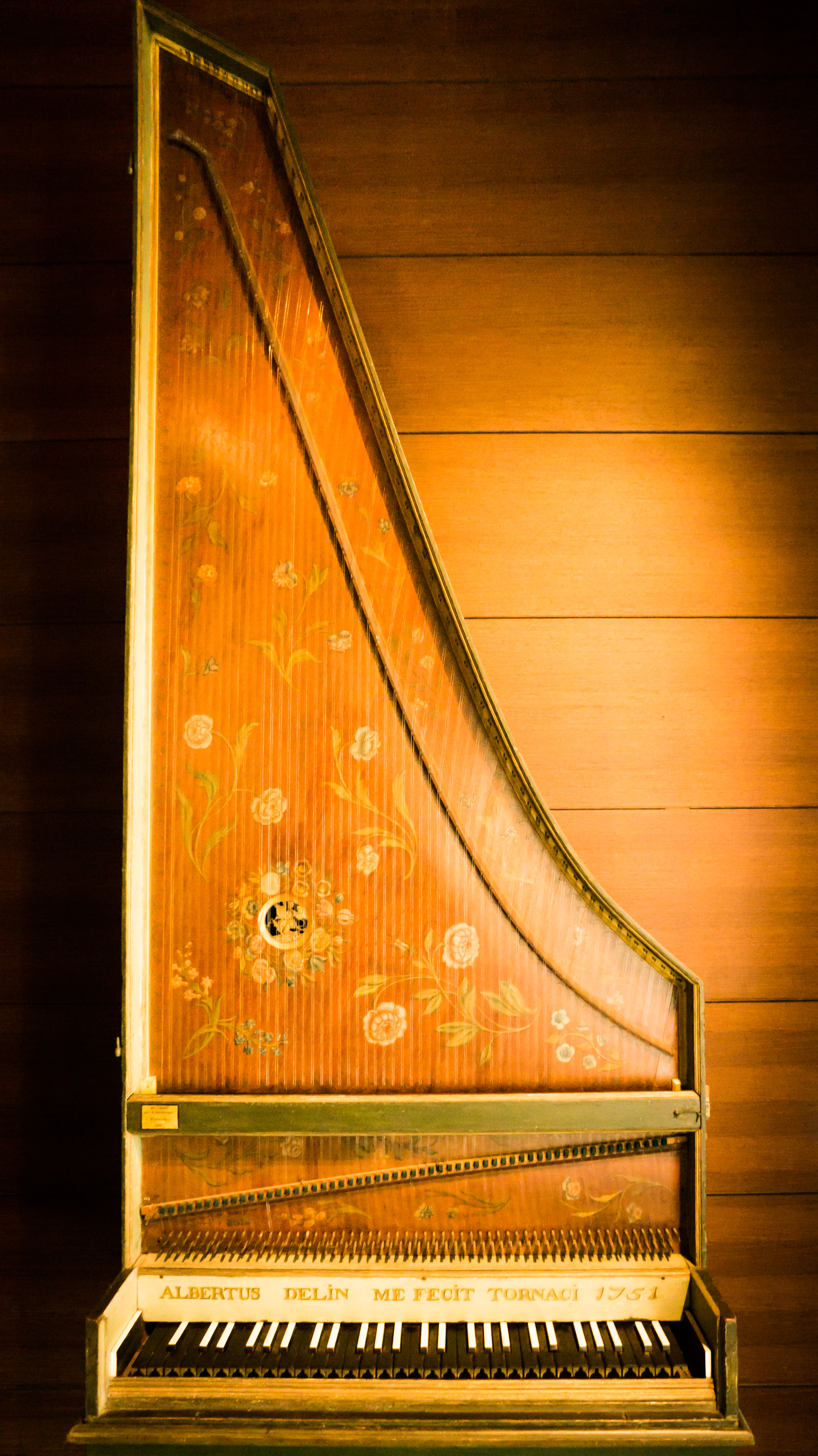
The 1751 clavicytherium in the musical instrument museum in Brussels

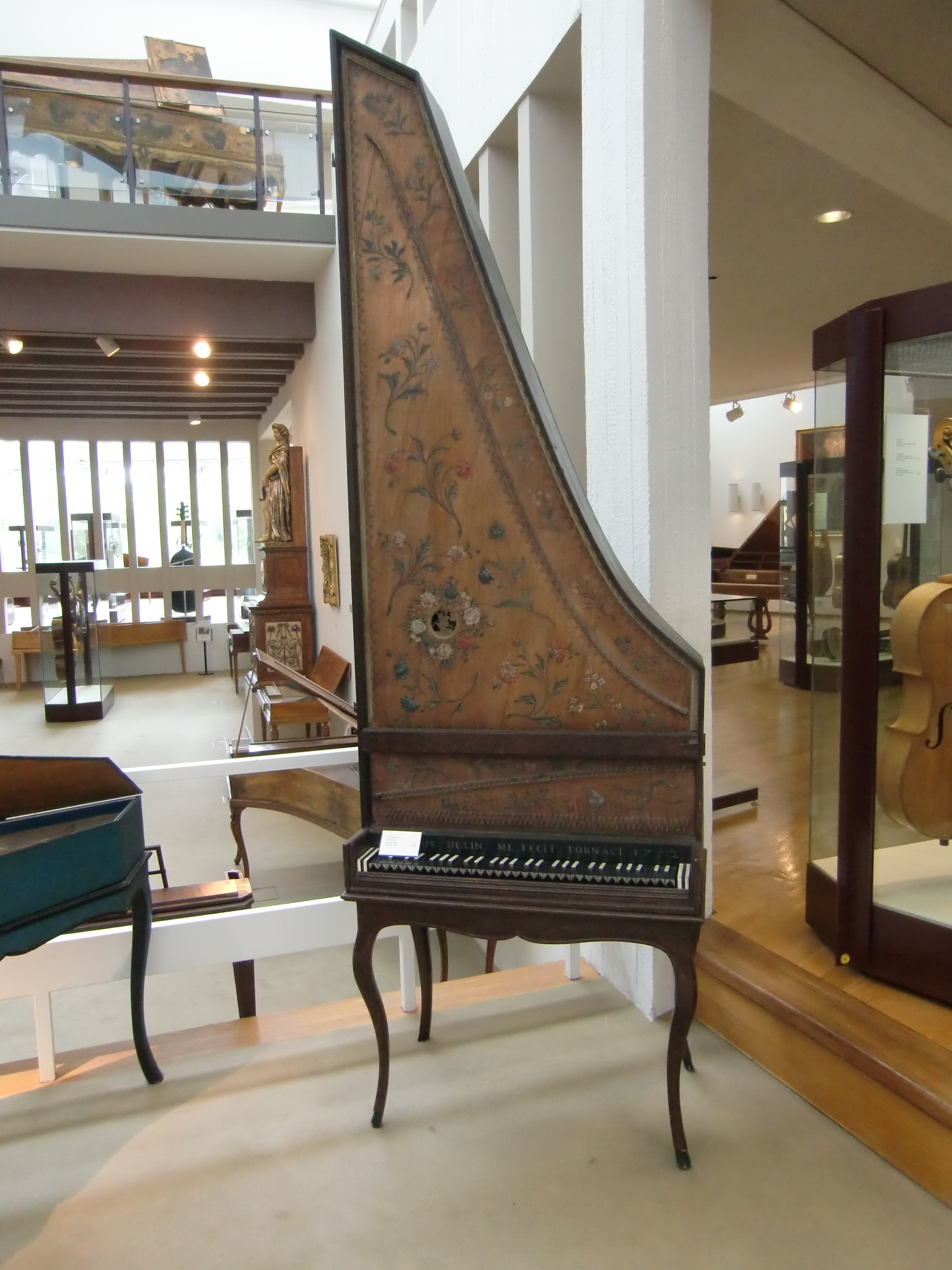
The 1752 clavicytherium at the musical instrument museum in Berlin

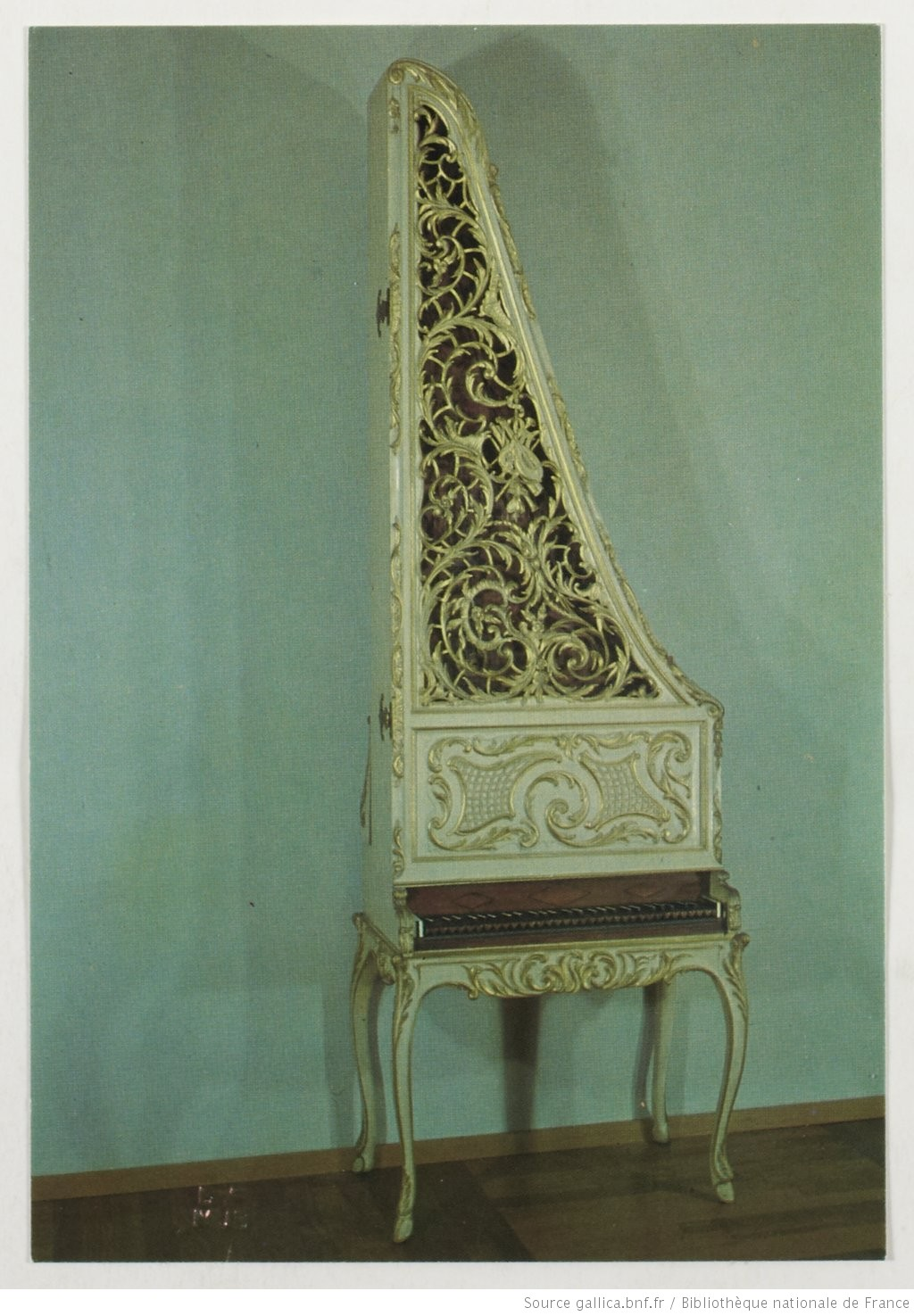
The 1760 clavicytherium in Gemeentemuseum in the Hague

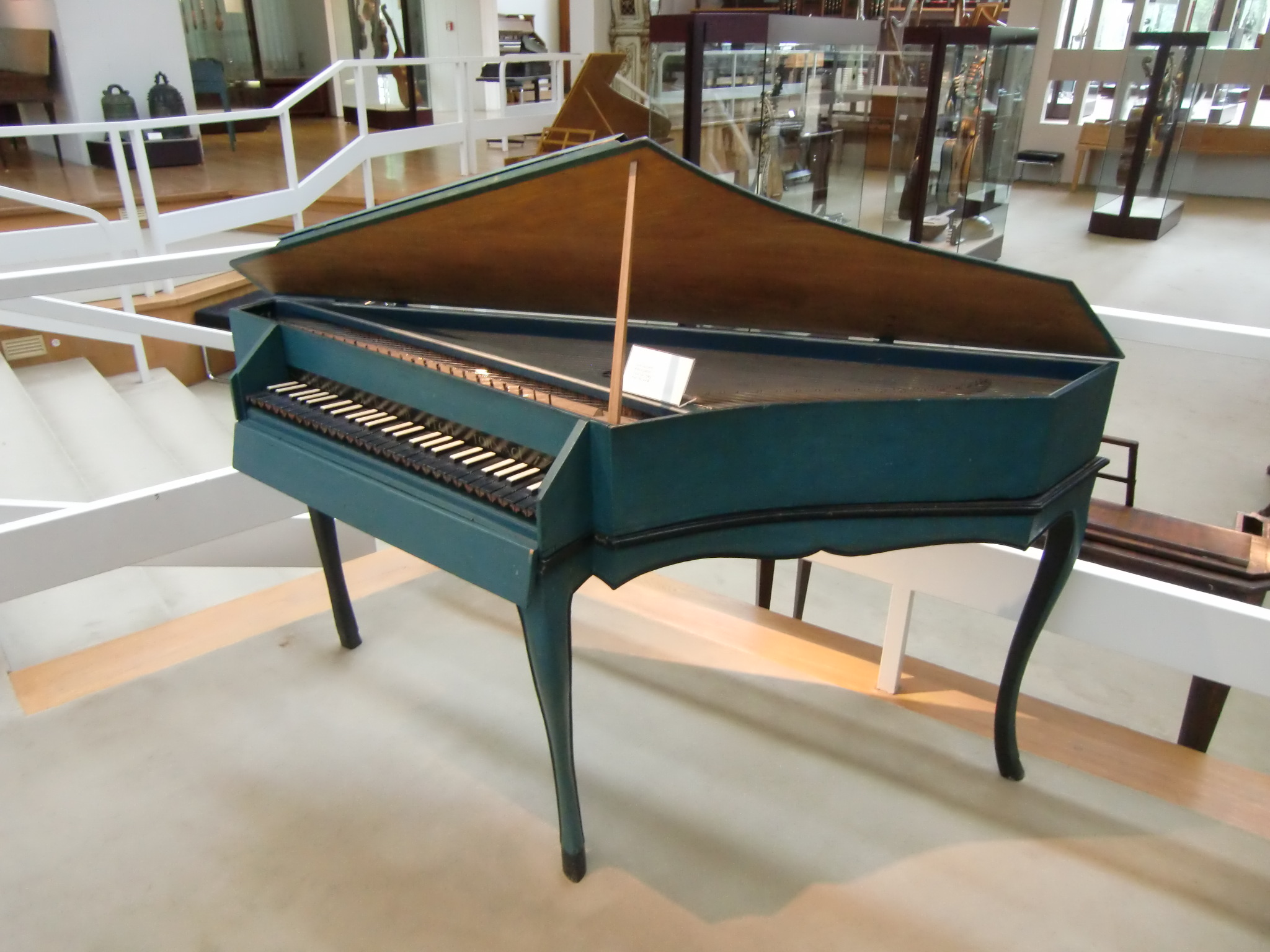
The 1765 bentside spinett in the musical instrument museum in Berlin

== See also ==
- List of historical harpsichord makers
- Harpsichord
- History of the harpsichord
- Spinet
- Octave spinet
- Clavicytherium

== Sources ==
- A History of the Harpsichord, Kottick EL, 2003, Indiana University Press, pp. 290–296
