= Tiergarten Spreebogen Tunnel =

Road tunnel in Berlin

The Tunnel Tiergarten Spreebogen is a 2.4 km long road tunnel in Berlin which connects Berlin Hauptbahnhof and Tiergarten. It is known as Tiergartentunnel.

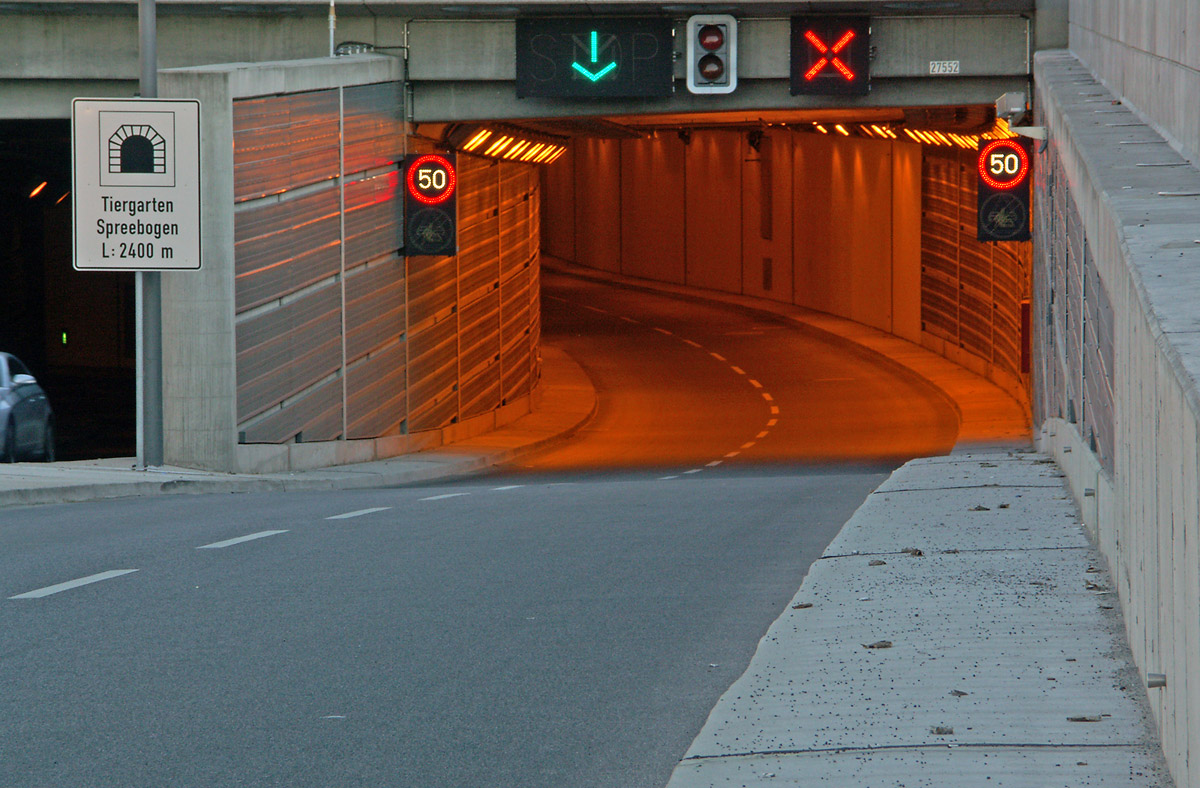
Tiergarten Tunnel entrance

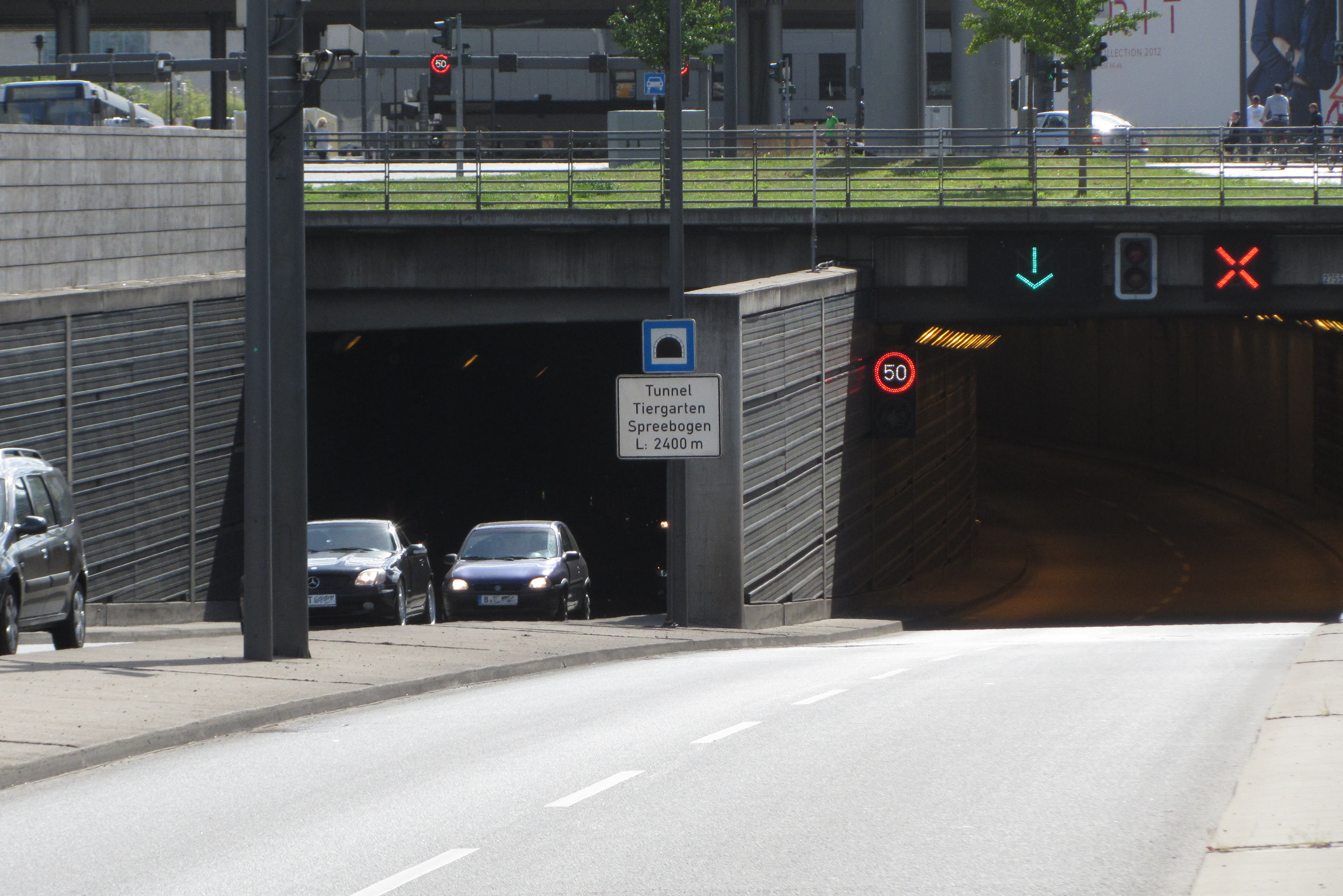
The northern portal

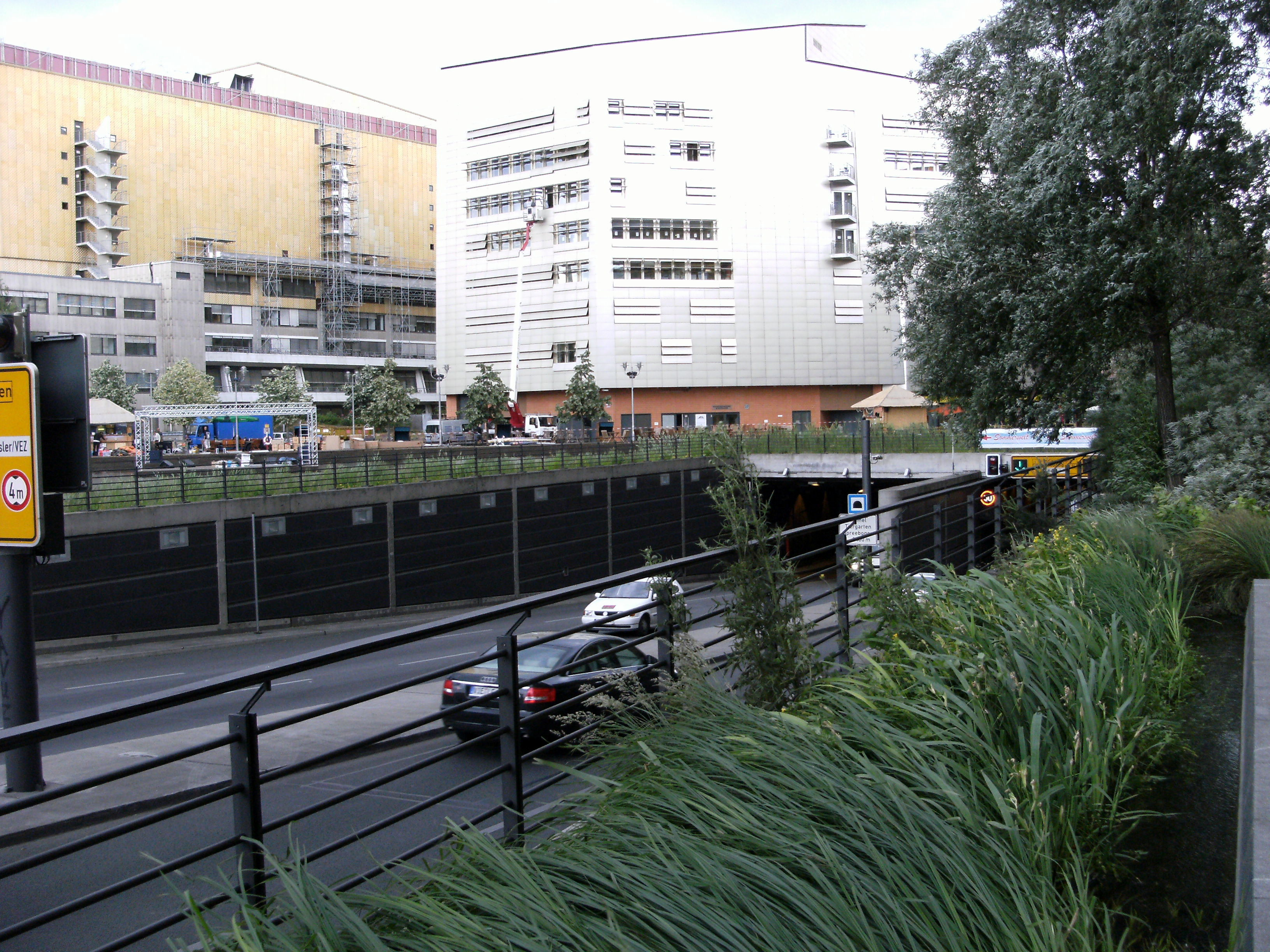
The southern portal

Each section has two lanes and a narrow standing strip. At the northern end there are access roads to Minna-Cauer-Straße and Invalidenstraße. The southern access roads are on Tiergartenstraße and the Reichpietschufer / George C. Marshall Bridge. It is part of the Bundesstraße 96 and the Inner Ring Road (Innenstadtring).

It was opened on 26 March 2006. Construction began in 2002. A similar tunnel is the SMART Tunnel in Kuala Lumpur.

== In popular culture ==
In 2004 – two years before it commissioned, the tunnel was used to film parts of The Bourne Supremacy.
