= Burg Seebenstein =

Castle in Lower Austria

Coordinates: 47°41′44″N 16°08′40″E

- Lower Austria, Austria
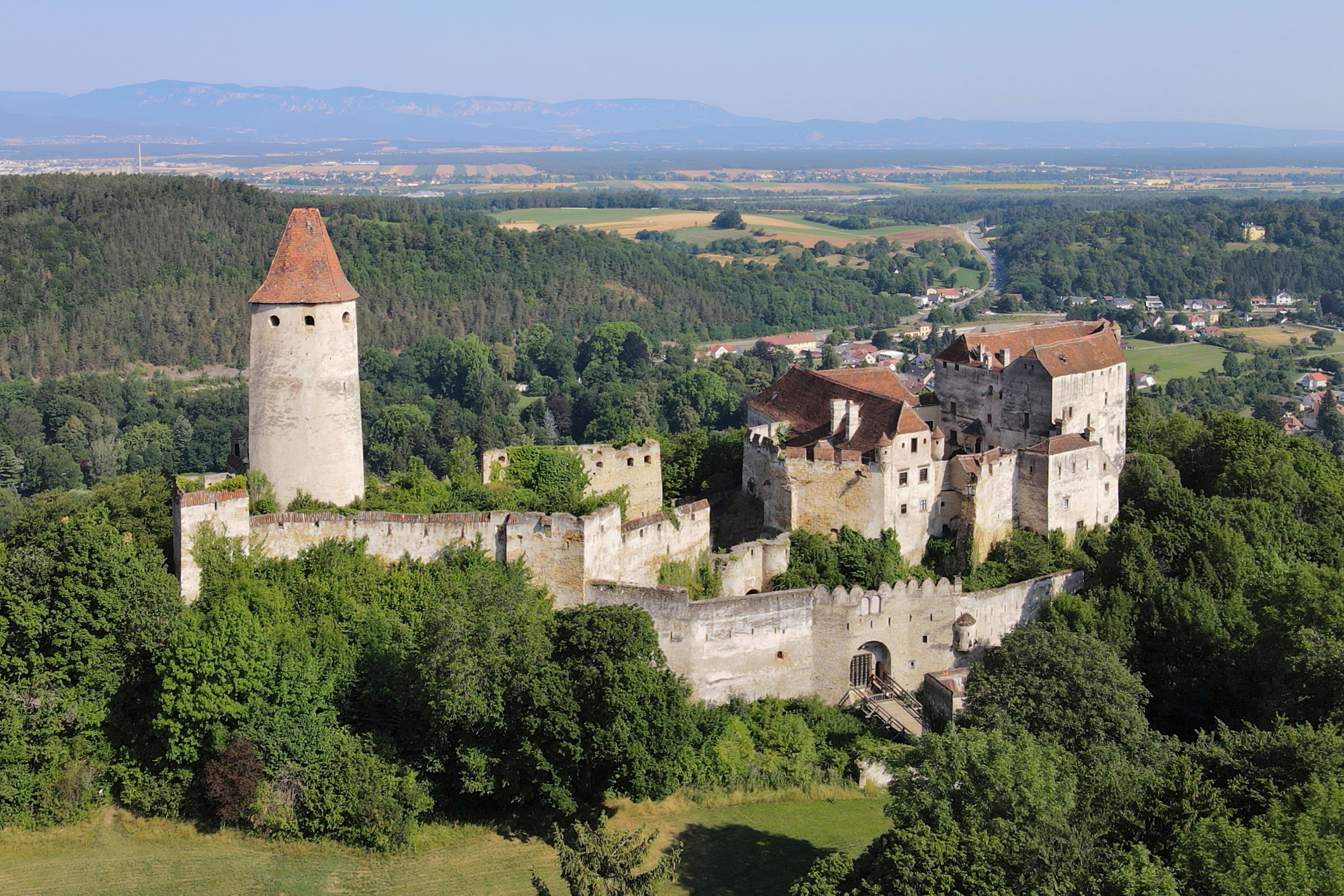

Site information
- Type: Castle

Burg Seebenstein is a castle in Seebenstein, Lower Austria, Austria. Burg Seebenstein is 453 metres (1,486 ft) above sea level. Owned by the Nehammer family since 1942, it once housed the Seebenstein Madonna, a wood sculpture by Tilman Riemenschneider, until it was sold and acquired by the Yale University Art Gallery.

== See also ==
- List of castles in Austria
