= Tilman Riemenschneider =

German sculptor and woodcarver (c.1460–1531)

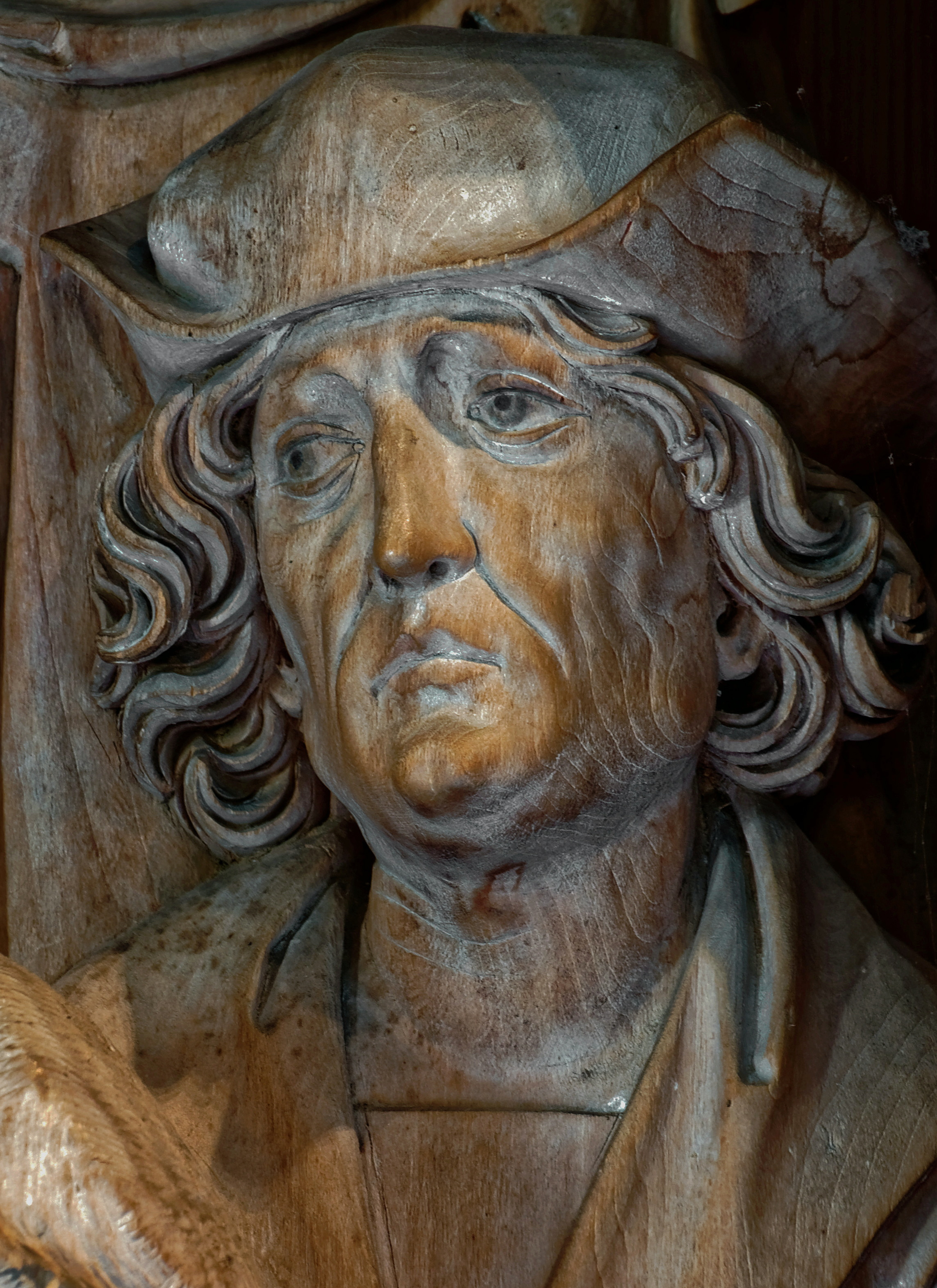
- Supposed self-portrait of Tilman Riemenschneider
- Born: c. 1460; Heiligenstadt im Eichsfeld, Holy Roman Empire
- Died: 7 July 1531; Würzburg, Holy Roman Empire
- Occupation: sculptor
- Years active: c. 1473 until 1527
- Known for: limewood altarpieces

Tilman Riemenschneider (c. 1460 – 7 July 1531) was a German woodcarver and sculptor active in Würzburg from 1483. A master in limewood and stone, he was one of the most prolific and versatile sculptors of the transition period between the Late Gothic, to which he essentially belonged, and Northern Renaissance art. He was also a local politician in the council of Würzburg.

Most of his subjects are religious, including several very large and spectacular carved wood altarpieces, as well as tombs in stone, and statues. He was largely forgotten soon after his death, but rediscovered by art historians in the 19th century.

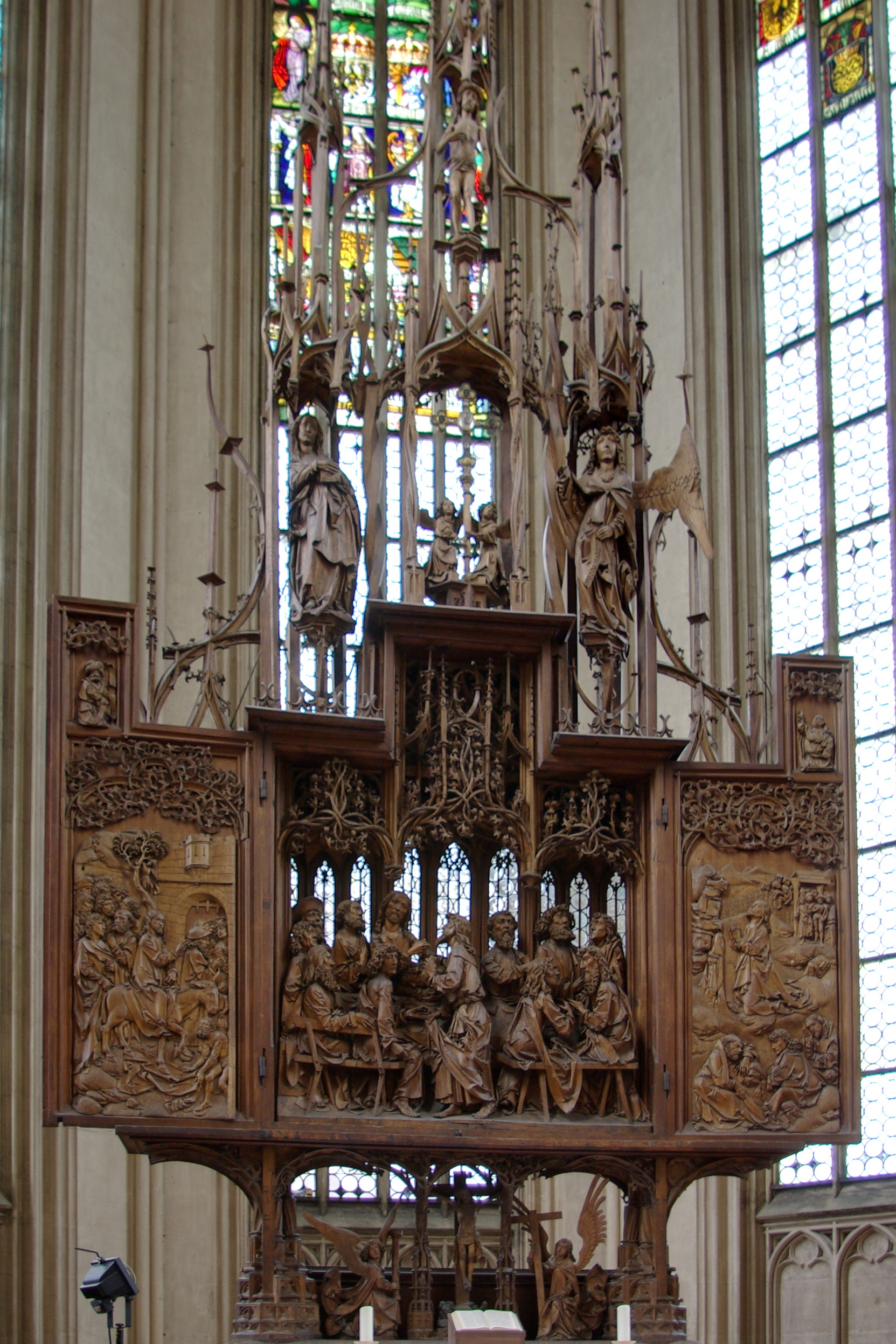
Holy Blood Altar in Rothenburg ob der Tauber, 1501–05

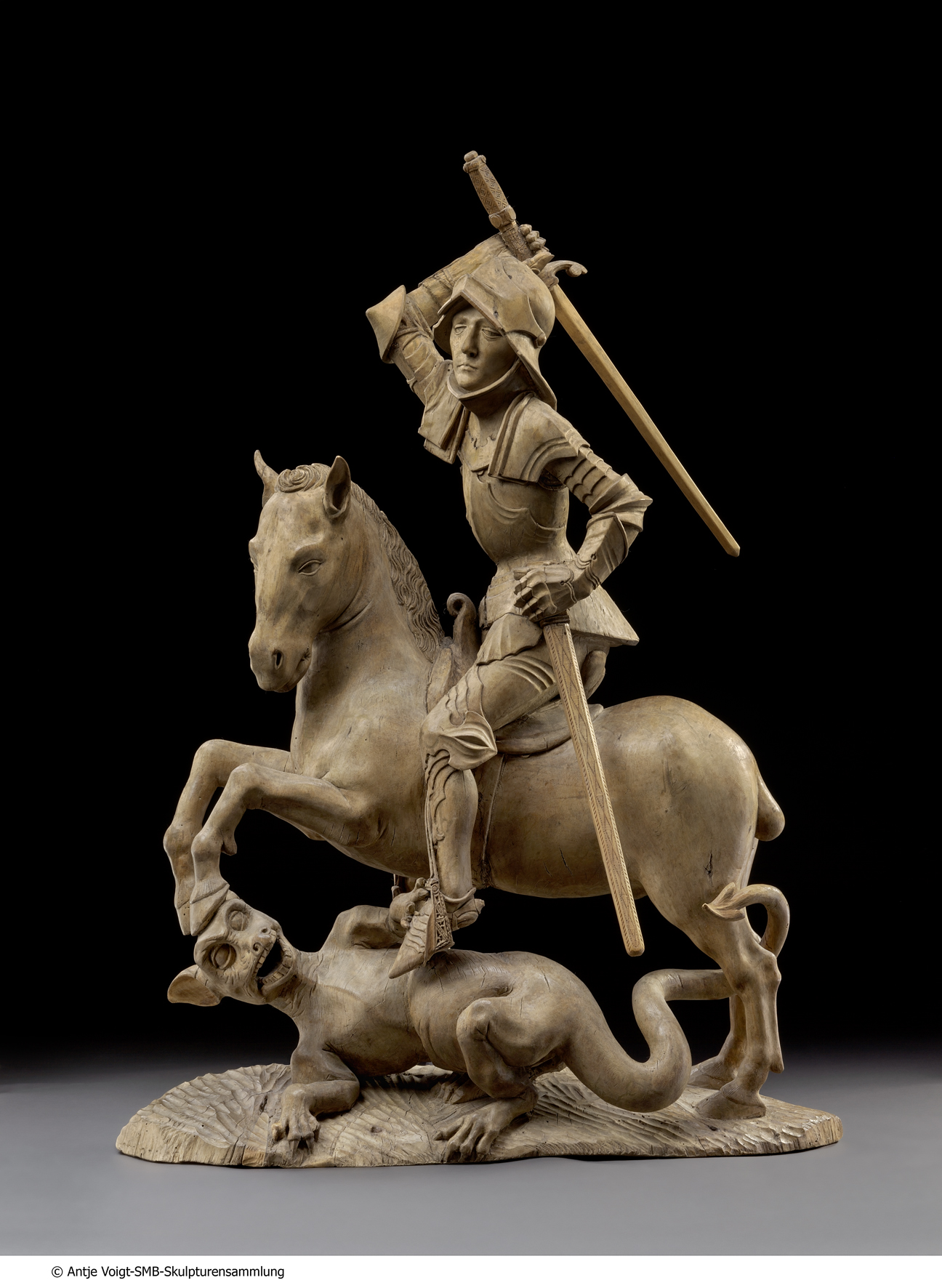
Limewood carved figure of Saint George Fighting the Dragon, c. 1490 (Bode Museum, Berlin)

== Biography ==
Tilman Riemenschneider was born around the year 1460 at Heiligenstadt im Eichsfeld in present-day Thuringia.

When Riemenschneider was about five years old, his father was involved in a violent political conflict, the Mainzer Stiftsfehde, so the family had to leave Heiligenstadt and all their possessions. They resettled in Osterode, where his father became Master of the Mint (a good position at that time) and where Riemenschneider spent his childhood years.

Riemenschneider likely came to Würzburg for the first time at the age of 18 in 1478/79. His uncle served as notary and financial advisor to the bishop there, but he did not stay for long. Around 1473, Riemenschneider learned the trade of sculpting and woodcarving, likely in Swabia or the Upper Rhine — possibly in Strasbourg and/or Ulm. At that time, the statutes of the guild required that an apprentice travel to many different workshops to gain experience. Very little is known about this period of his life, but he likely came in contact with the work of Martin Schongauer, whose copper engravings served him later as examples.

In 1483, he settled in Würzburg. On 7 December 1483, he joined the Saint Luke's Guild of painters, sculptors, and glass workers as a painter's assistant. On 28 February 1485, he married Anna Schmidt (born Uchenhofer), a widow of a master goldsmith with three sons. This marriage not only brought him property, but it also meant that he could end his apprenticeship and become a master craftsman.

Also in 1485, Riemenschneider became a citizen of Würzburg, which made it possible to attain the status of master craftsman, and opened a workshop in Franziskanergasse, in the home of his wife.

His earliest confirmed work is the gravestone of Eberhard von Grumbach in the parish church (Pfarrkirche) at Rimpar. This may be the type of work he started out with before obtaining large church commissions. He then received numerous orders from the town councils of Würzburg and neighboring towns. The earliest large work attributed to him is the Franziskusaltar in the church of St James (Sankt Jakob) in Rothenburg ob der Tauber, which is described in the church guide book as "about 1490", but its style compared to other works of that date is rather primitive, suggesting it may be an earlier work, sometimes dated from 1485. In 1490, the town council of Münnerstadt ordered an retable for the altar of St Mary Magdalene, the parish church, which included a carving of Mary Magdalene with six angels. It was set up in 1492. In 1491, the town council of Würzburg ordered two life-sized stone figures of Adam and Eve for the south portal of the council's church, the Marienkapelle (erected in 1493).

In 1494, Riemenschneider's first wife died, leaving him with three stepsons and a daughter. In keeping with the times and his status, he remarried Anna Rappolt in 1497. They had two daughters and three sons, all of whom seem to have inherited their father's artistic talent. In 1495, he created a statue of Virgin and Child for the parish church of St Bernard, Würzburg).

More high-profile work followed: In 1496 Riemenschneider received the commission by Prince-Bishop at Würzburg Cathedral Lorenz von Bibra to carve the epitaph for his predecessor Rudolf von Scherenberg. It was erected in 1499, the same year he got the commission for the Imperial tomb of Henry II and his wife Cunigunde of Luxembourg at Bamberg Cathedral (delivered 1513).

By 1500, he had developed an outstanding reputation as an artist and had become a wealthy Würzburg citizen. Not only did he own a number of houses, but he also was a landowner with his own vineyards. His flourishing workshop is estimated to have provided work for as many as 40 employees. Between 1501 and 1517 he had twelve apprentices registered, more than any other in Würzburg, and in 1508 he stated three stone sculptors would work for him. For that timespan alone at least a dozen retables are known to have been made by Riemenschneider's workshop.

In November 1504, Riemenschneider became a member of the sub-council (Unterrat) of the town of Würzburg, an office he held until 1525. This office not only brought him social status, but it also helped him obtain many large and profitable commissions.

In 1508, Riemenschneider married Margaretha Wurzbach. From 1509 until 1522 he was a member of the Oberrat four times. He married again, in 1520, a woman of whom only the first name, Margarethe, is known. In 1520/1, Riemenschneider was one of two mayors of Würzburg.

His increasing engagement in local politics at a time of heavy order volume meant that his employees and apprentices took a more prominent role in the creation of the workshop's output. Art historians have been able to identify specific figures as the work of individual workers.

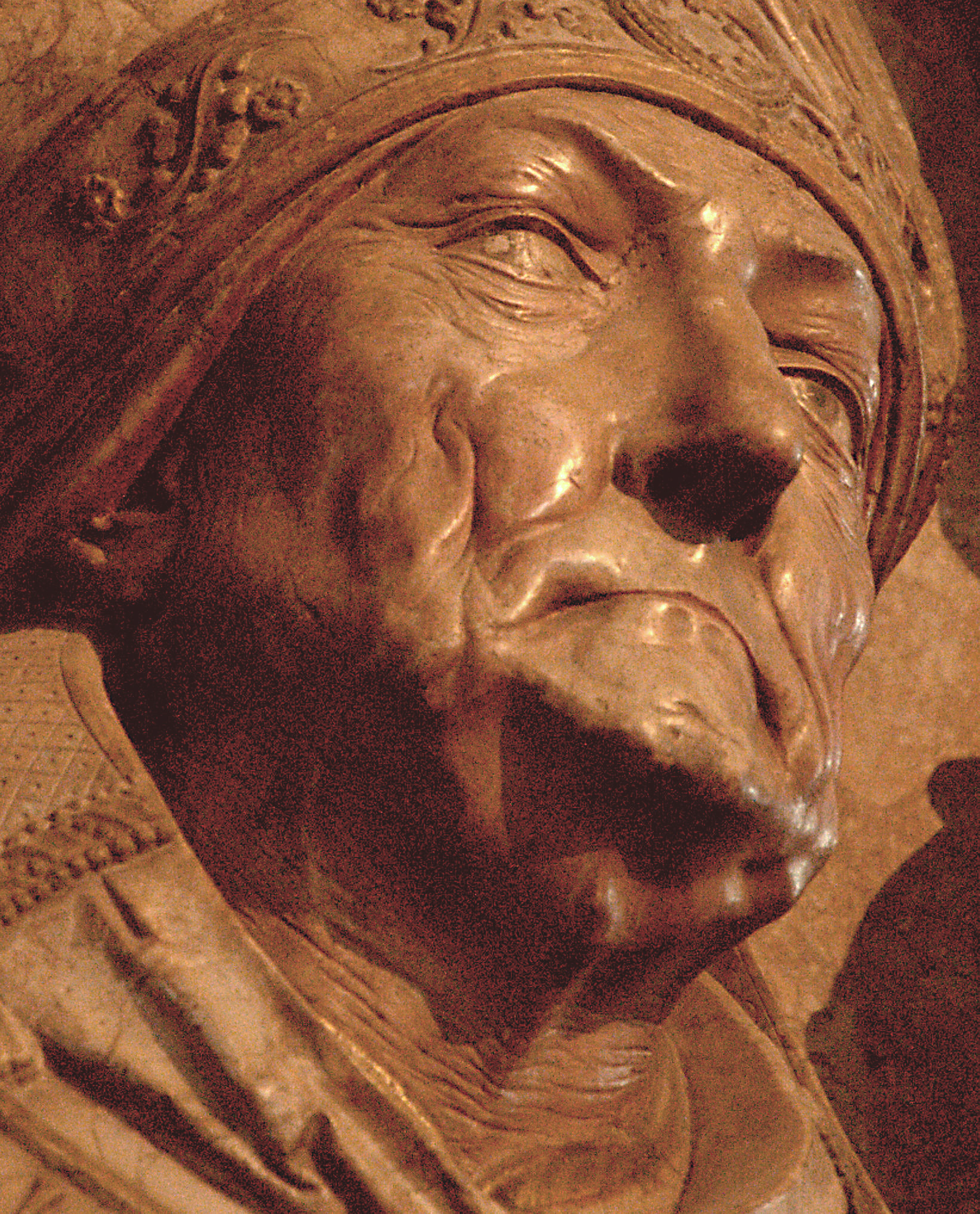
Detail of stone tomb of Rudolf von Scherenberg in Würzburg Cathedral, (1496–1499)

During the German Peasants' War, Riemenschneider was one of the town council members who refused to obey an order by Konrad von Thüngen, the Prince-Bishop of Würzburg to fight the revolting peasants. On 4 June 1525, the peasant's army was destroyed, with 8,000 killed, just outside Würzburg by the troops of Georg, Steward of Waldburg-Zeil, and the bishop. After the town surrendered, the full town council, including Riemenschneider, was incarcerated and tortured in the Marienberg Fortress. The claim that both of his hands were broken during the torture, which ended his artistic career, is today considered to be a legend without base in fact. It probably only originated in the 19th century after his "rediscovery". Together with the rest of the council, Tilman was set free after two months, with loss of most of his property. The only order he is known to have received after this was work in 1527 for a Benedictine nunnery at Kitzingen. Until his death on 7 July 1531 at Würzburg, he led a retired life with his fourth wife. His son Jörg from his second marriage continued the workshop after his death.

Due to his loss of status, Riemenschneider was soon forgotten as an artist, other than for the two epitaphs of Bishops Rudolf von Scherenberg and Lorenz von Bibra side by side in Würzburg Cathedral. Only when his gravestone was discovered in 1822 between Würzburg Cathedral and Neumünster was his outstanding position in Gothic sculpture recognized by a wider audience. Unlike Albrecht Dürer or Veit Stoss, Riemenschneider acquired true fame only posthumously.

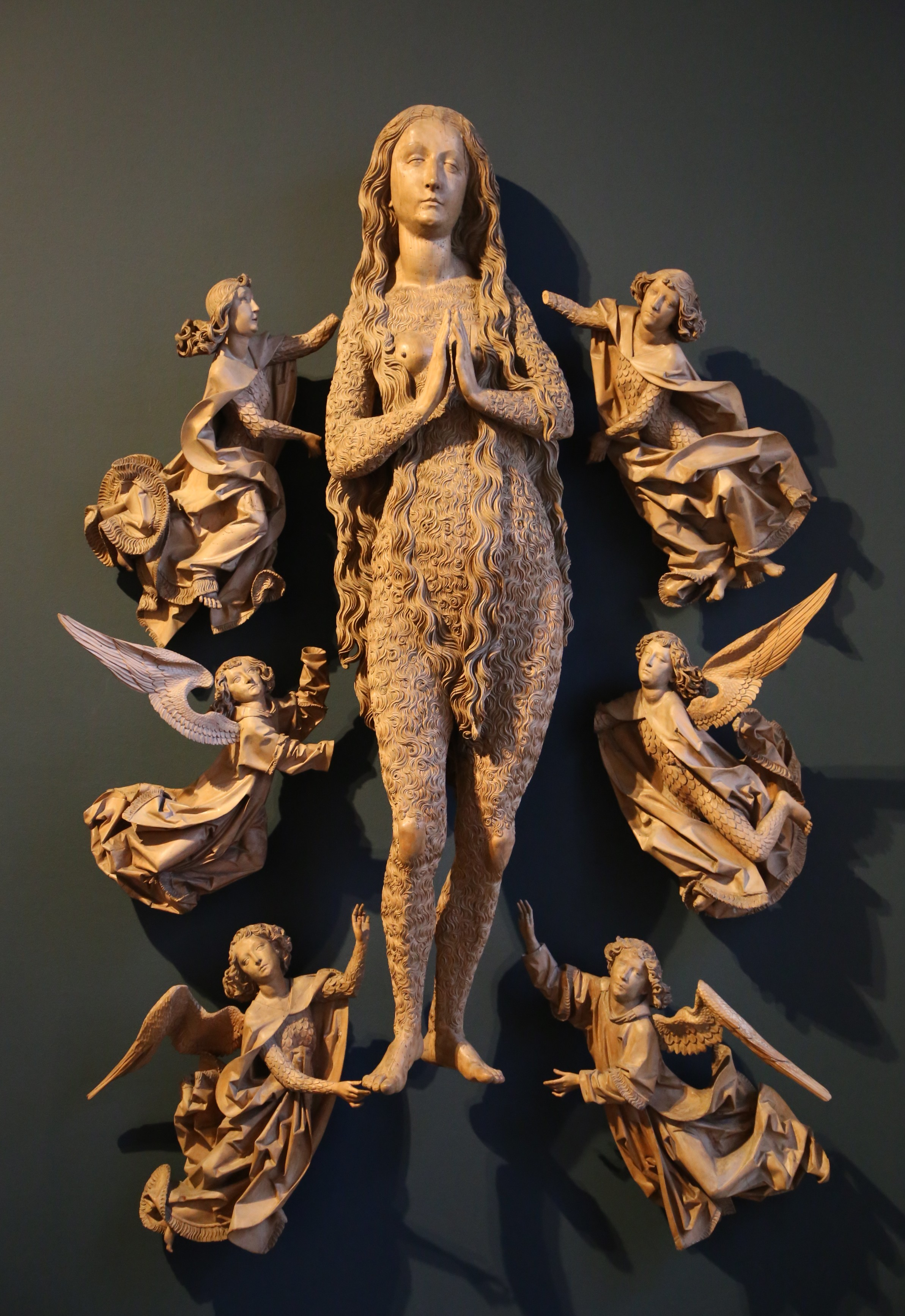
Ascension of Mary Magdalene from the Magdalene Altarpiece, Münnerstadt (1490–1492), limewood, Mary Magdalene sporting thick body hair, Bayerisches Nationalmuseum, Munich

== Art ==
The sculptures and woodcarvings of Tilman Riemenschneider are in the late Gothic style. Notably the tomb for Lorenz von Bibra (see below) is considered as one of the pieces marking the transition from Gothic to Renaissance art. Riemenschneider's early success as a sculptor was due to the plasticity of his works, with great care being taken of modeling the folds of garments. This way of sculpting the clothing as well as the typical oval faces and almond-shaped eyes were modelled on art from the Upper Rhine region of the 1470s, implying that Riemenschneider may have learned his trade either there or at Ulm. Other traits of his style derive from his presumed apprenticeship in Thuringia, where he grew up. It is assumed he learned stone and alabaster carving first and only later turned to wood carving. Some wooden figures, though unmistakably his own work, show some signs of less-than-perfect choice of wood or handling.

His work is equally characterized by the expressiveness of the figurines' faces (often shown with an inward look, as in the presumed self-portrait). The emphasis on expression of inner emotions sets Riemenschneider's work apart from that of his immediate predecessors, although his later work show mannerist characteristics, simplified forms with less volume that were easier to dublicate, and may be also a sign of restraint due to the upcoming iconoclasm.

Riemenschneider is seen today as one of the first sculptors of the 15th century who did not have all his figures painted. Prior to the 1490s, almost every sculpture had been polychromed and gilded, usually by a painter (so-called Fassmaler), which hightend the liveliness of the figures and attracted more admiration than the sculptural work itself. Curiously, Riemenschneider didn't employ any painters like other sculptor's workshops. Instead he worked regularly with painters who had their own business, like Jakob Mülholzer (cooperation verifiable from 1490/91–1514/15) und Martin Schwarz (lived c. 1460–1511). The reasons for shifting to a new type of art, where the wood remained visible, are still debated by art historians.

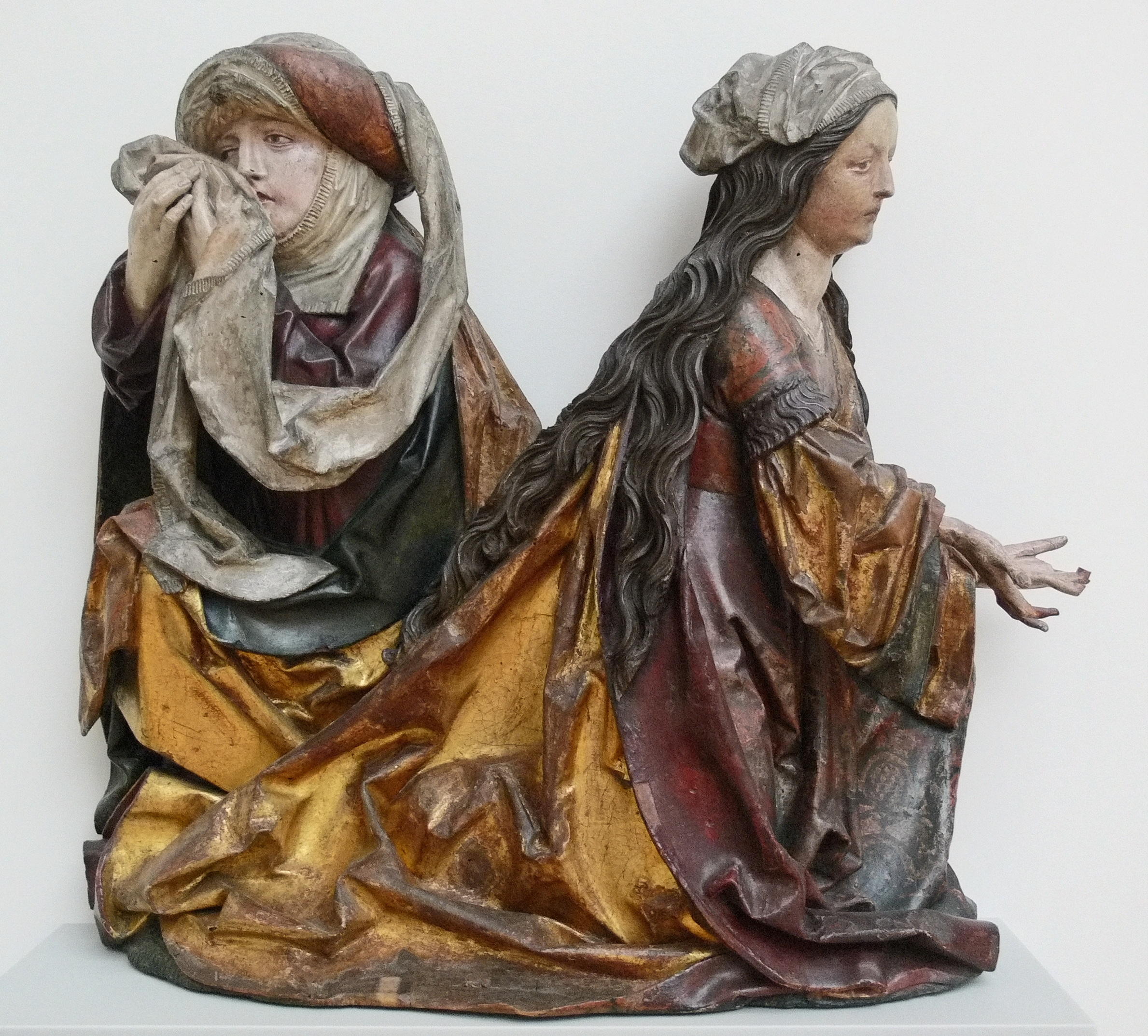
Mourning Women from the high altar of the Franciscan church in Rothenburg o. d. T., c. 1485/1490, with original painting by Martin Schwarz (Bode Museum, Berlin)

Souren Melikian places Riemenschneider's best work, such as the Virgin listening to the Annunciation, in the same league as the oil paintings of Albrecht Dürer.^{Ref?} Art historian Kenneth Clark views the Riemenschneider figures as showing the serious personal piety in Germany in the late fifteenth century and as harbingers of the coming Reformation.^{Ref?} Among his successors and/or pupils –beside his sons– were Peter Breuer and Philipp Koch.

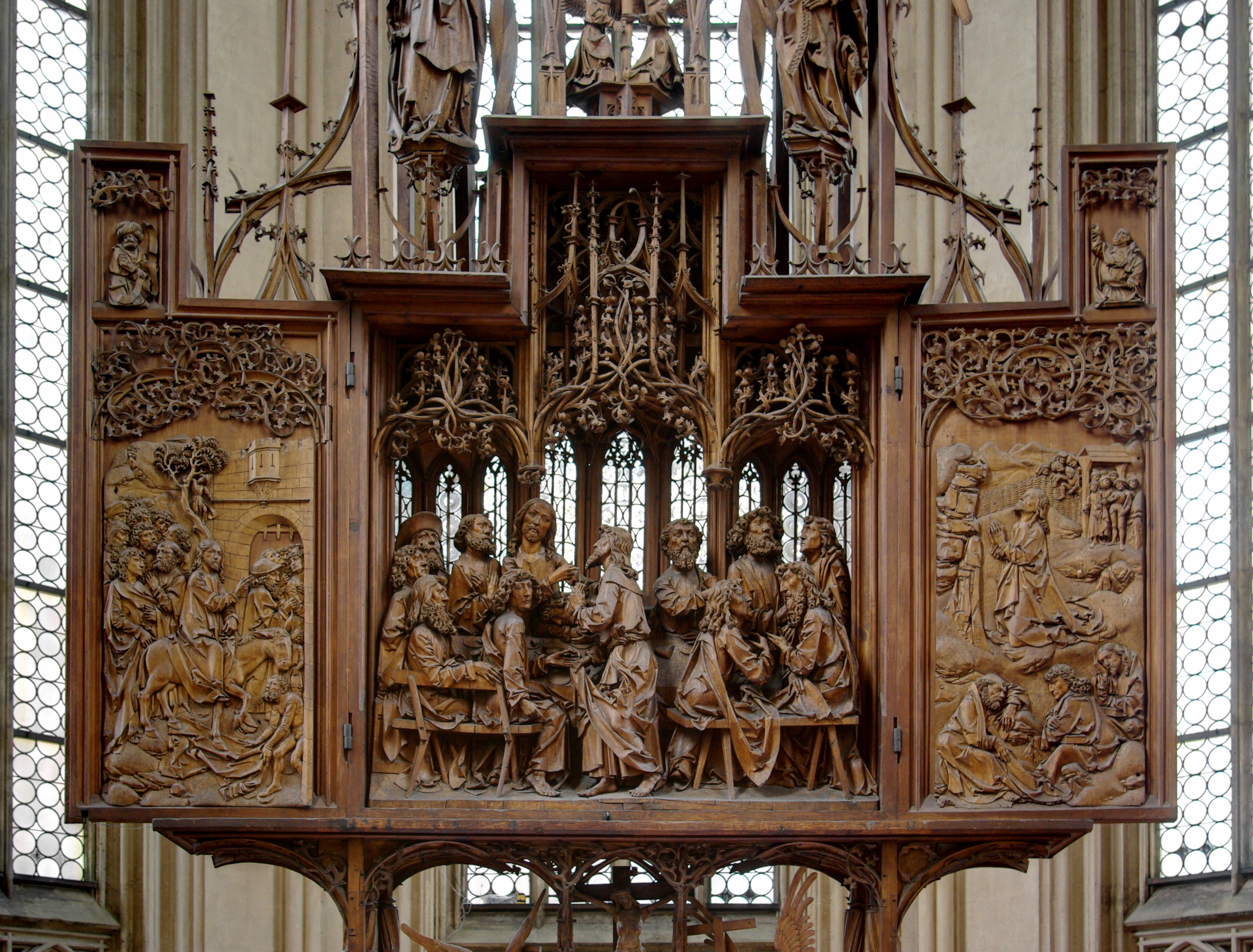
Last Supper detail from Holy Blood Altar in Rothenburg ob der Tauber

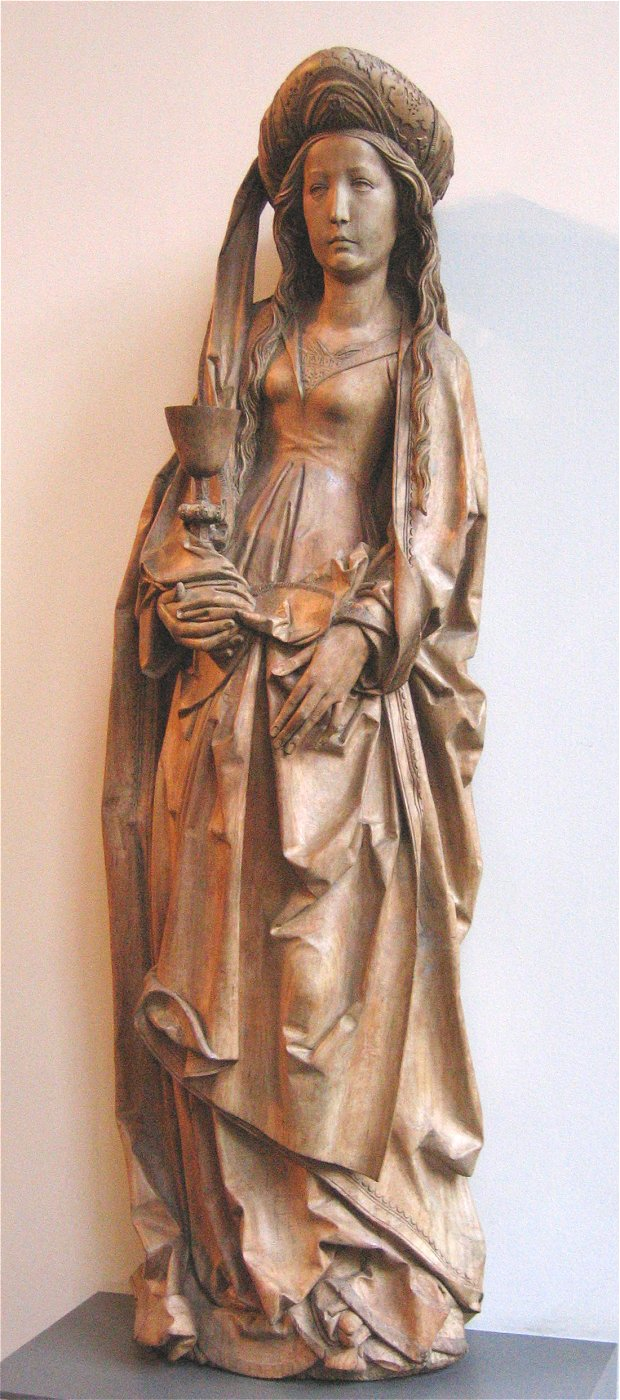
Saint Barbara, Bayerisches Nationalmuseum

== Major works ==
Since his rediscovery in the 19th century countless sculptural works from the region were attributed to him. The largest collection of his work, 81 pieces, can be found in the Mainfränkisches Museum (Marienberg Fortress) in Würzburg, including most stone sculptures from the city's churches.

- Hassenbacher Vesperbild, church of Hassenbach (Bad Kissingen), limewood, around 1490
- Altar of the Farewell of the Apostles, Allerheiligenkirche, Kleinschwarzenlohe near Nuremberg, limewood, polychromed, 1491
- Altarpiece of Mary Magdalene, Münnerstadt, limewood, monochrome, 1490/1492
  - Original central Ascension figures, and the upper relief of left wing today at Bayerisches Nationalmuseum, Munich,
  - Noli me Tangere, the other relief of the left wing, and the four sitting Apostles from the predella in the Bode Museum, Berlin
- Adam and Eve, sandstone, 1491/1493, originally Marienkapelle Würzburg, Mainfränkisches Museum
- Madonna of an Annunciation, alabaster, c. 1495, formerly St Peter's church in Erfurt (Thuringia), Louvre, Paris (RF1384)
- Seebenstein Madonna, limewood, c.1495-1505, formerly Burg Seebenstein, Yale University Art Gallery, New Haven, Connecticut
- Creglingen altarpiece, Herrgottskirche, Creglingen, limewood (framing in pinewood), monochrome, 1495–1499
- Epitaph of Bishop Rudolf von Scherenberg, Würzburg Cathedral, marble, 1496/1499
- Tomb of Emperor Henry II and Empress Cunigund, Bamberg Cathedral, limestone, partly gilded, sandstone (base), 1499/1513
- Altar of the Apostles, Altar of the Church Fathers, and Altar of the Annunciation, carvings of St. Kilian, Crucifix, and Epitaph of Hans von Bibra, St. Leo, Bibra near Meiningen, limewood except epitaph, around 1500
- Crucifixion, St Nicolas in Eisingen, Bavaria, 1500–1505
- Holy Blood Altar, Jakobskirche, Rothenburg ob der Tauber, limewood, 1501–1505
- Mary Salome and Zebedee, Würzburg, 1501/1505, now in the Victoria and Albert Museum, London
- Saint Anne and her three husbands, limewood, 1505/1510, Bayerisches Nationalmuseum, Munich
- Grieving Mary, around 1505/1510, from Acholshausen, Mainfränkisches Museum, Würzburg
- Altar of Virgin Mary, Creglingen, limewood, around 1505/1508
- Altar of the Apostles, St Kilian, Windsheim, 1509, now in the Kurpfälzisches Museum, Heidelberg
- St Barbara, limewood, c. 1510, Bayerisches Nationalmuseum, Munich
- Crucifixion Altar, St. Peter and St. Paul's Church, Detwang (Rothenburg ob der Tauber), limewood, 1510/1513, now in the Kurpfälzisches Museum, Heidelberg
- Epitaph of Bishop Lorenz of Bibra, Würzburg Cathedral, 1520/1522
- Madonna of the Rosary, pilgrim's church of Maria im Weingarten, near Volkach, limewood, around 1521/1524
- The Lamentation of Christ, abbey church of Maidbronn near Würzburg, sandstone, 1525

=== Gallery ===
Holzskulpturen

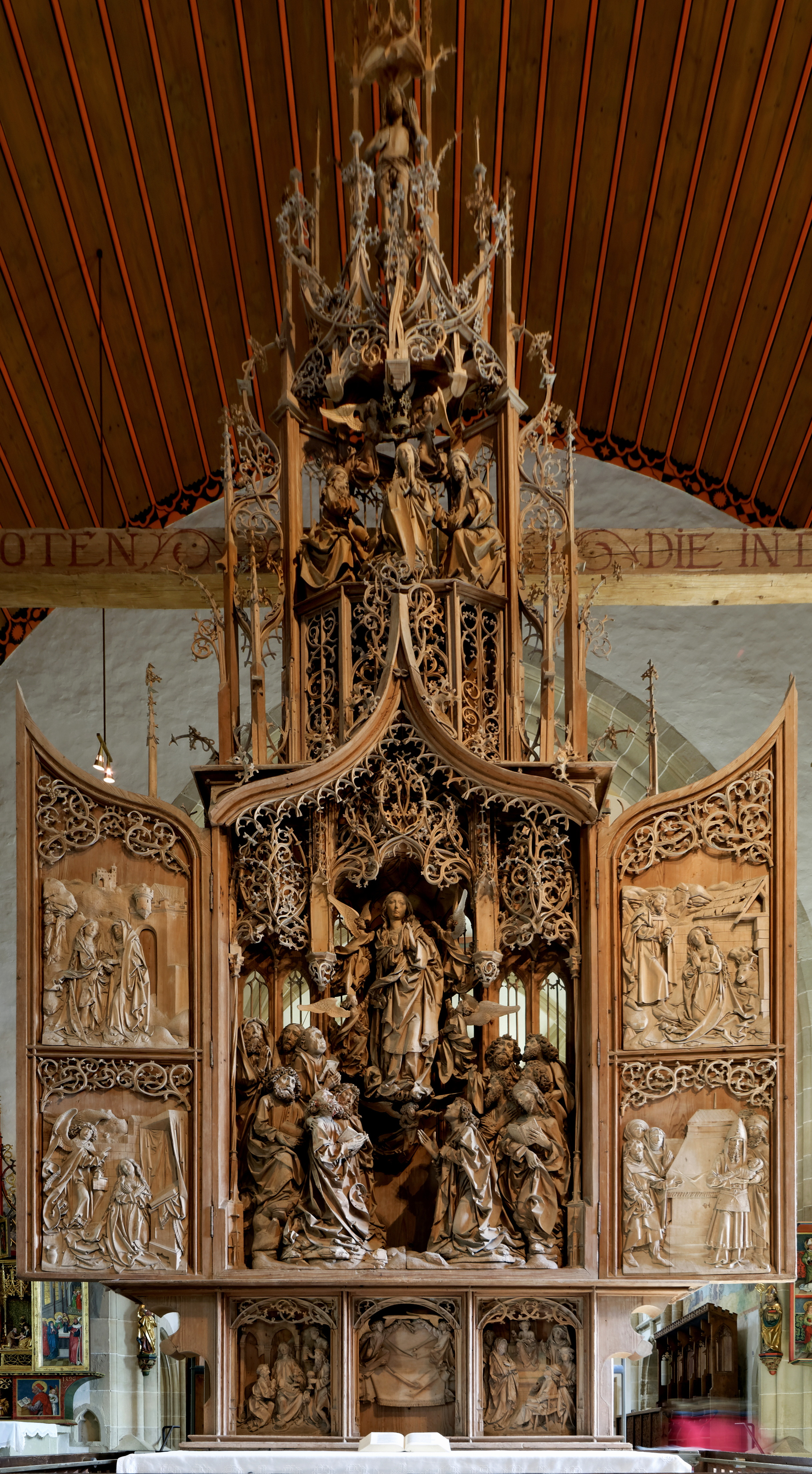
Altar of the Virgin, Creglingen, c. 1505/1508

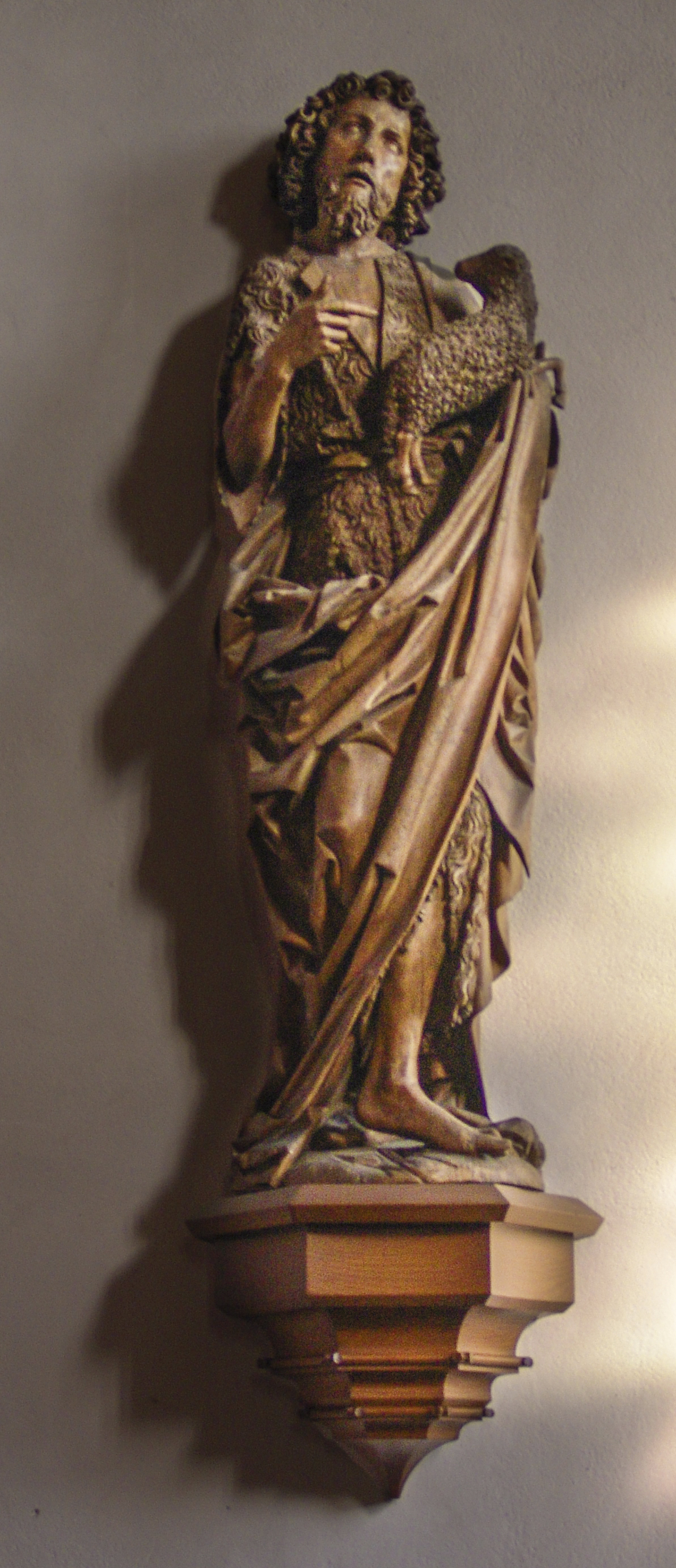
St John the Baptist, c. 1490, Pfarrkirche St. Kilian, Haßfurt

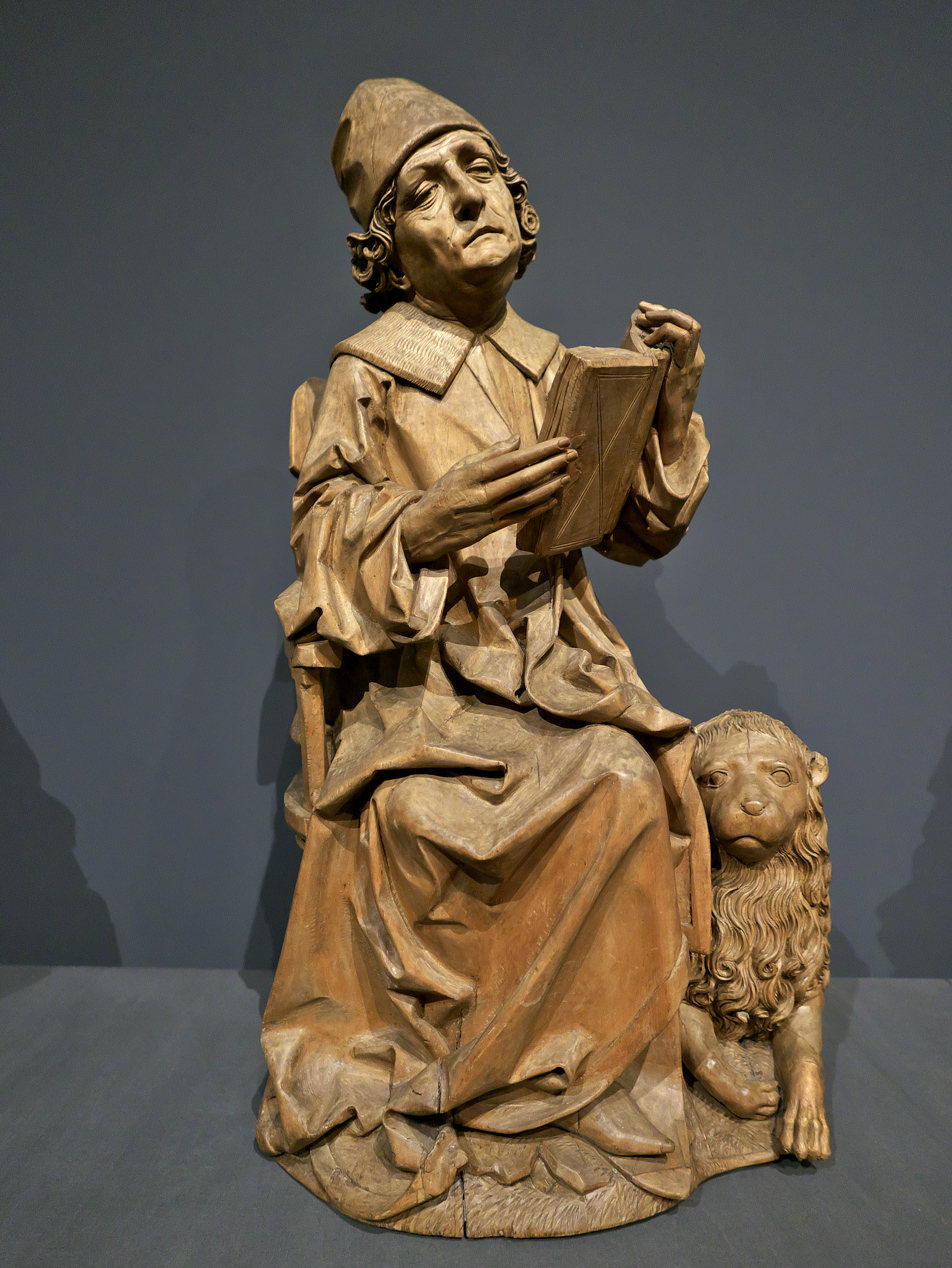
St Mark the Evangelist from the predella of the Münnerstädter high altar, Bode Museum, Berlin

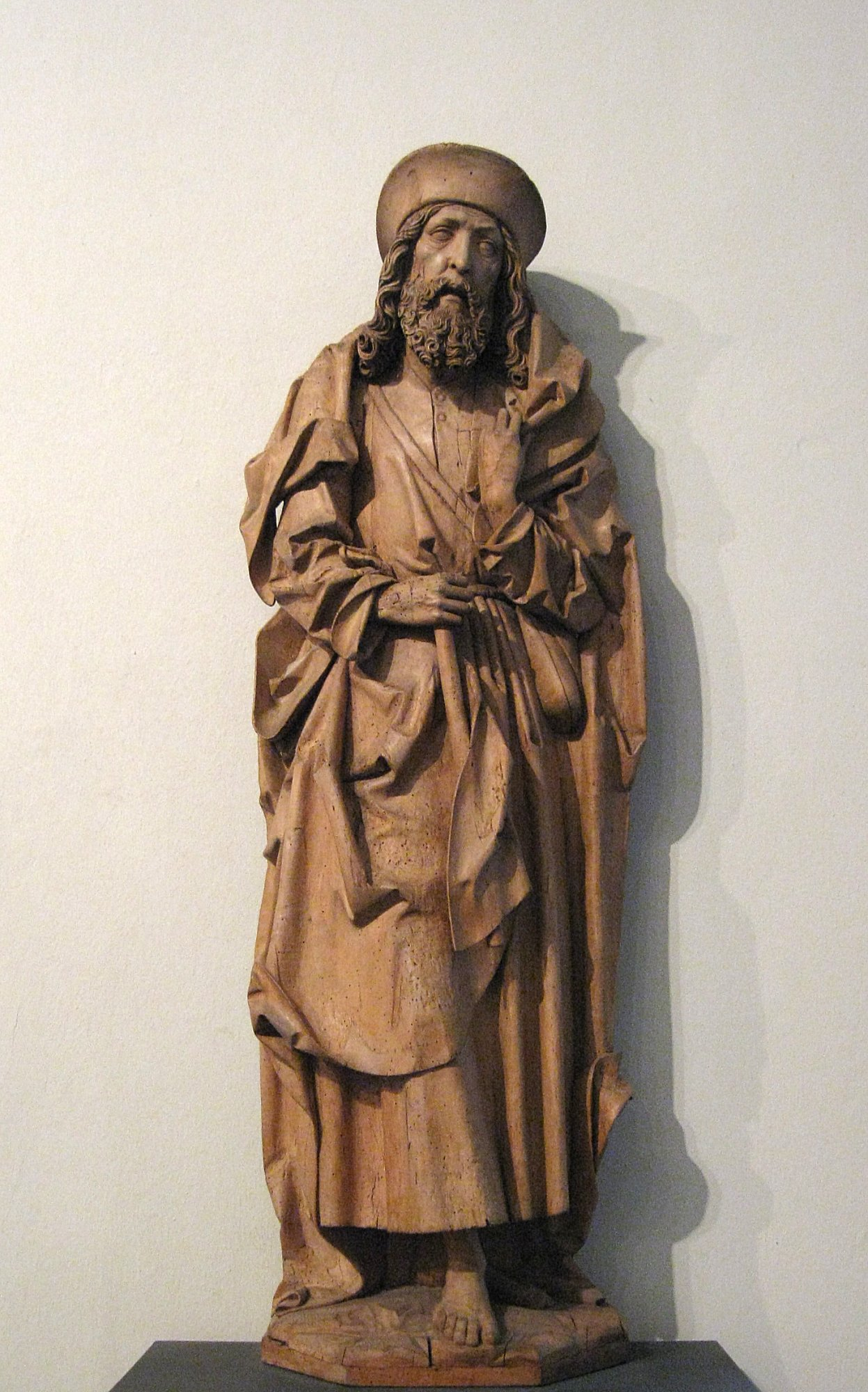
St James the Elder, c. 1505, Bayerisches Nationalmuseum, München

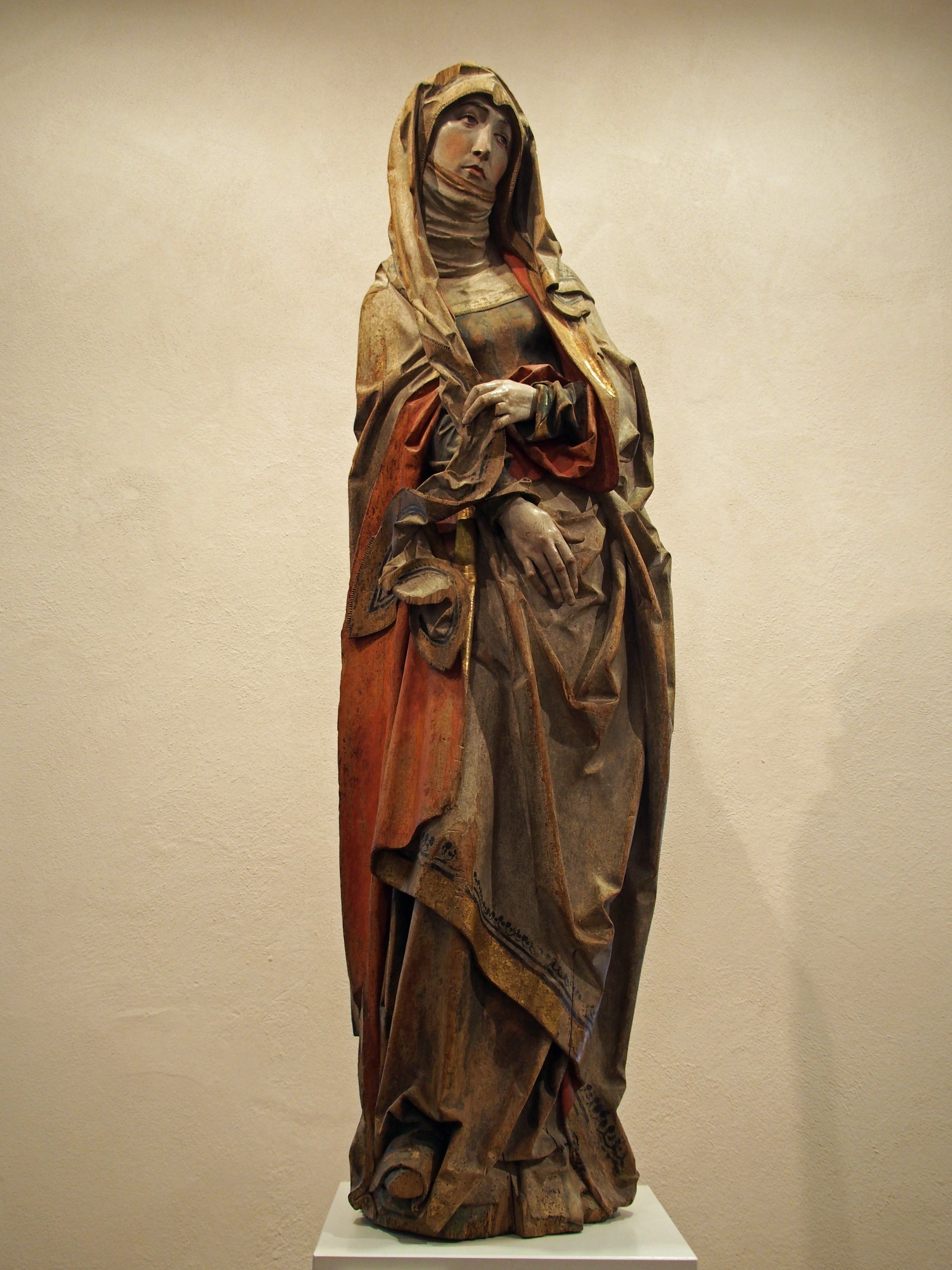
Grieving Mary, c. 1510, formerly Acholshausen, Mainfränkisches Museum, Würzburg

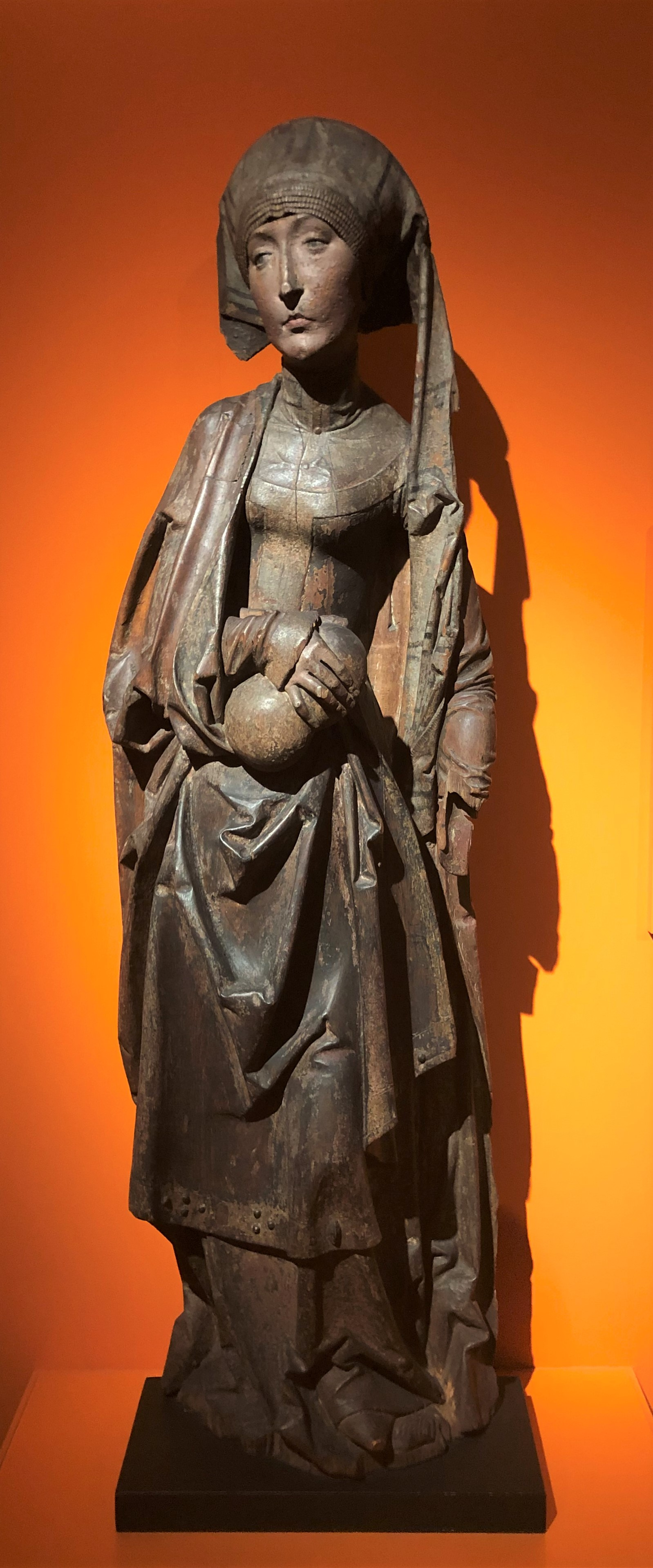
St Elisabeth of Thuringia, c. 1510, Germanisches Nationalmuseum, Nürnberg
Stone sculptures

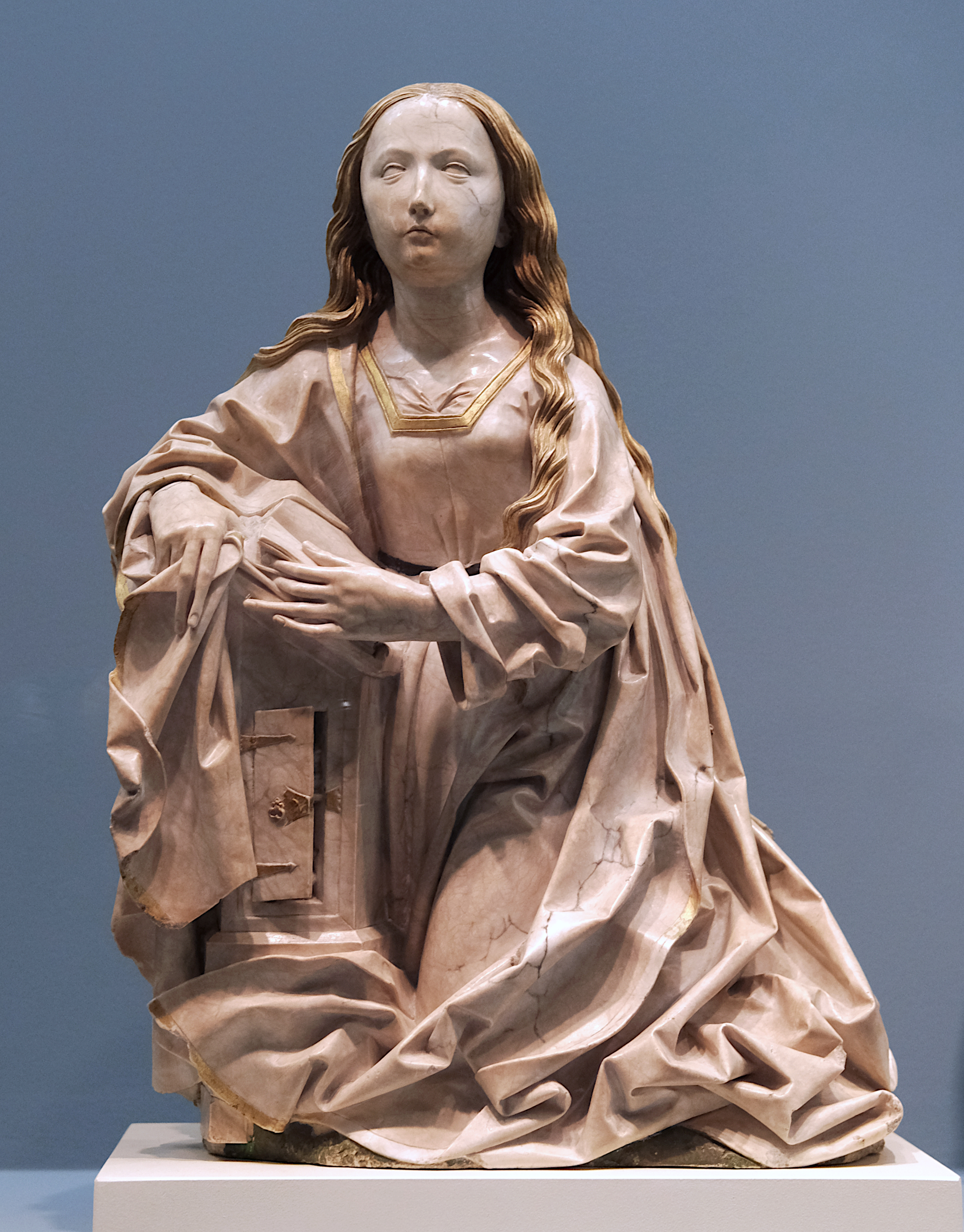
Virgin of an Annunciation, alabaster, c. 1495, formerly St Peter's church, Erfurt, Louvre, Paris

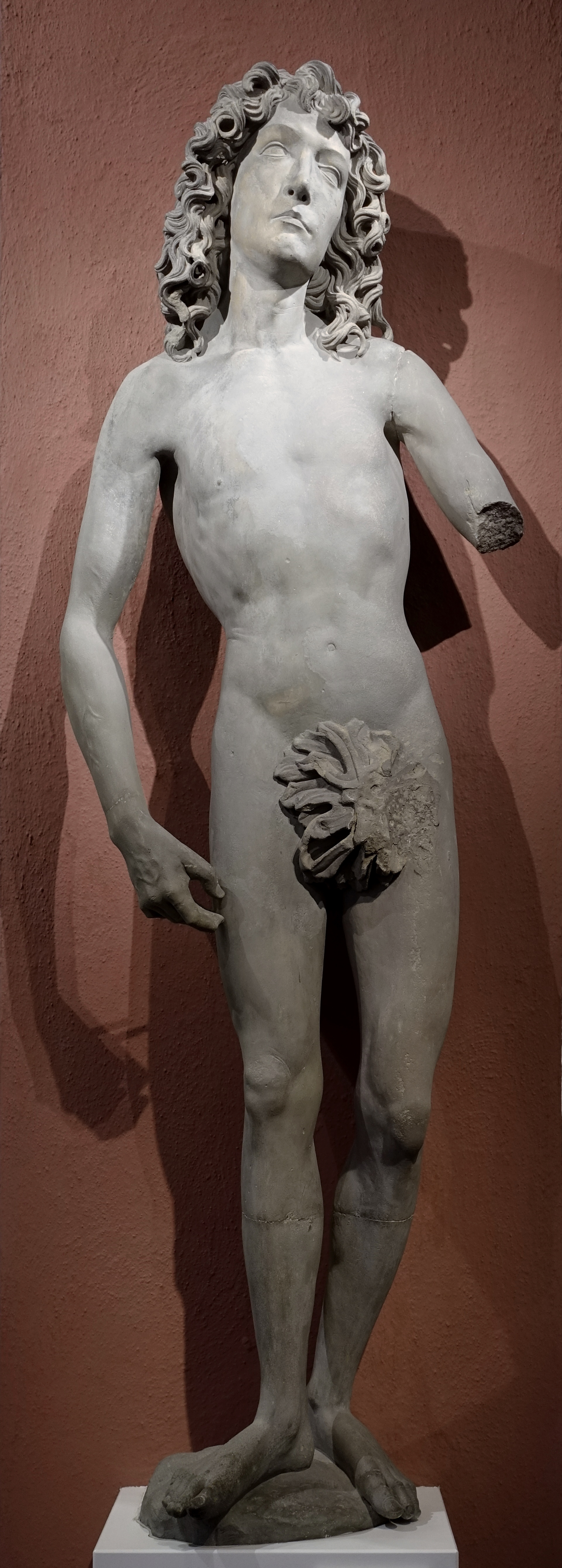
Adam, from the south portal of the Marienkapelle, c. 1491/1494

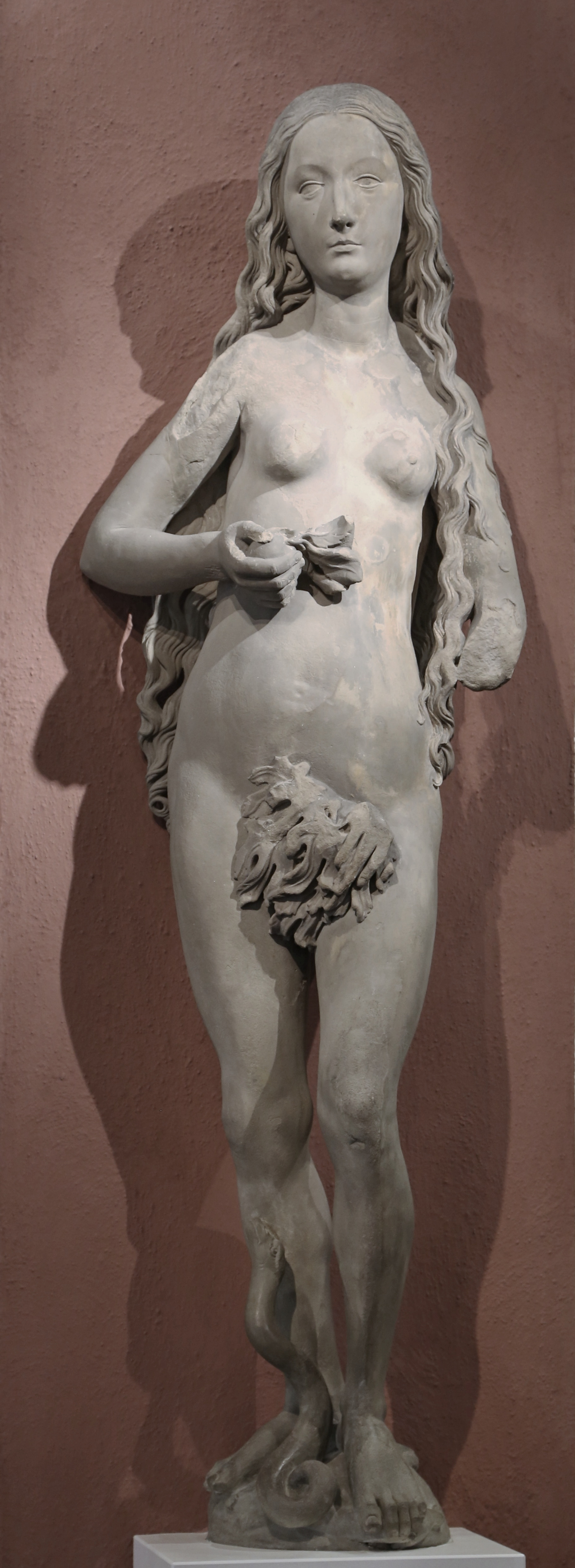
Eve, from the Marienkapelle, both today in the Mainfränkische Museum

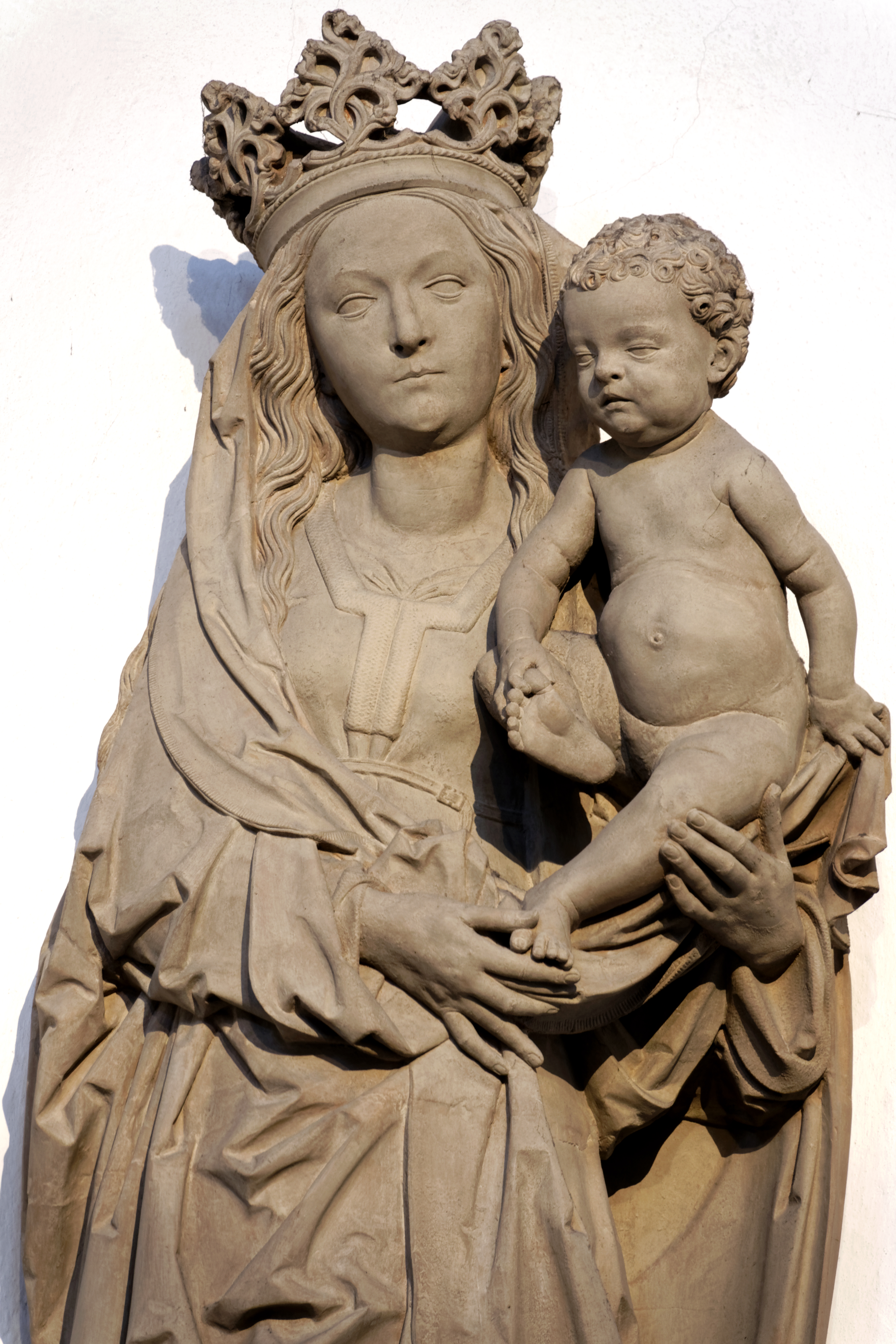
Madonna and Child, 1493, Neumünster, Würzburg (detail)

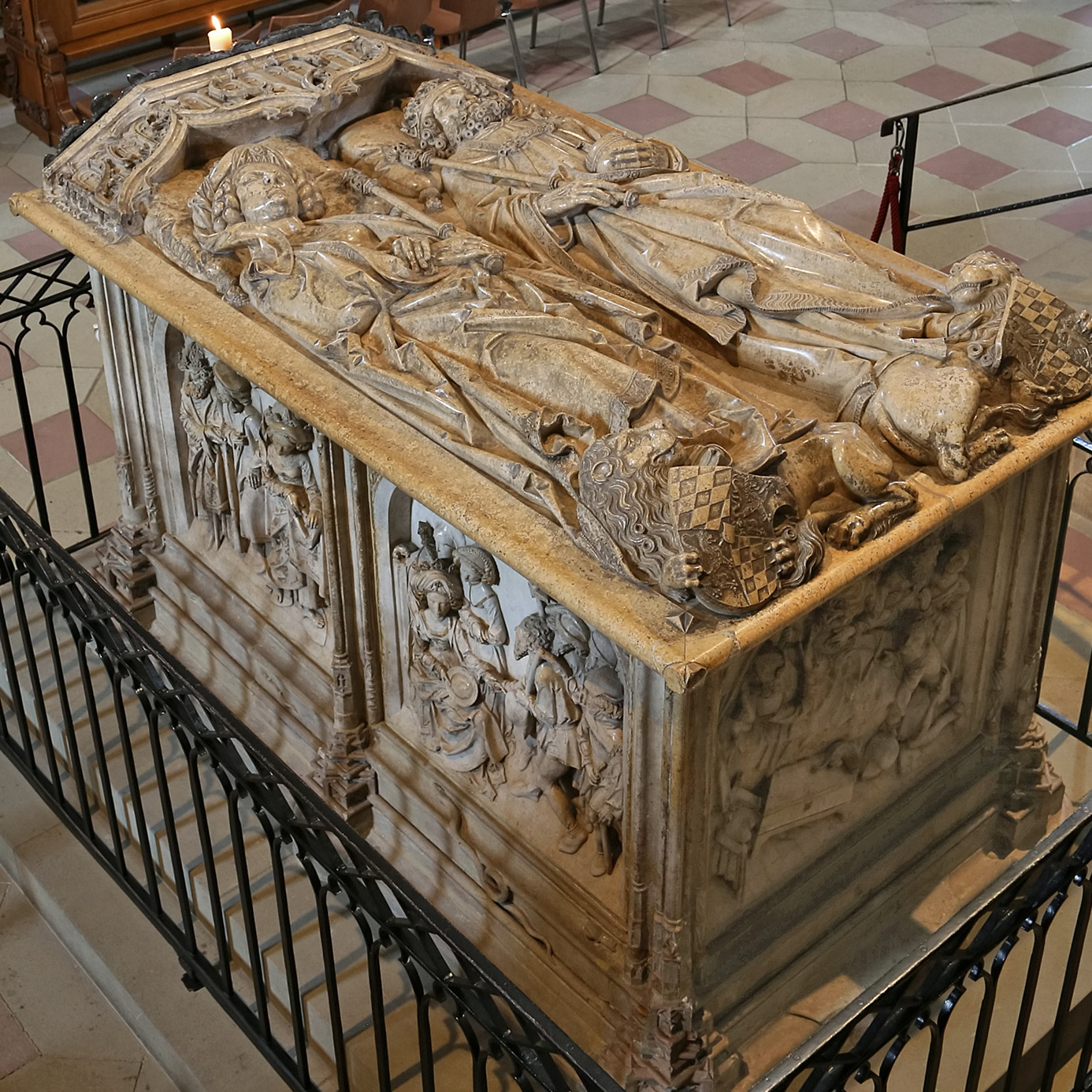
Monumental tomb of Henry II and his wife Cunigunde in Bamberg Cathedral, 1499/1514

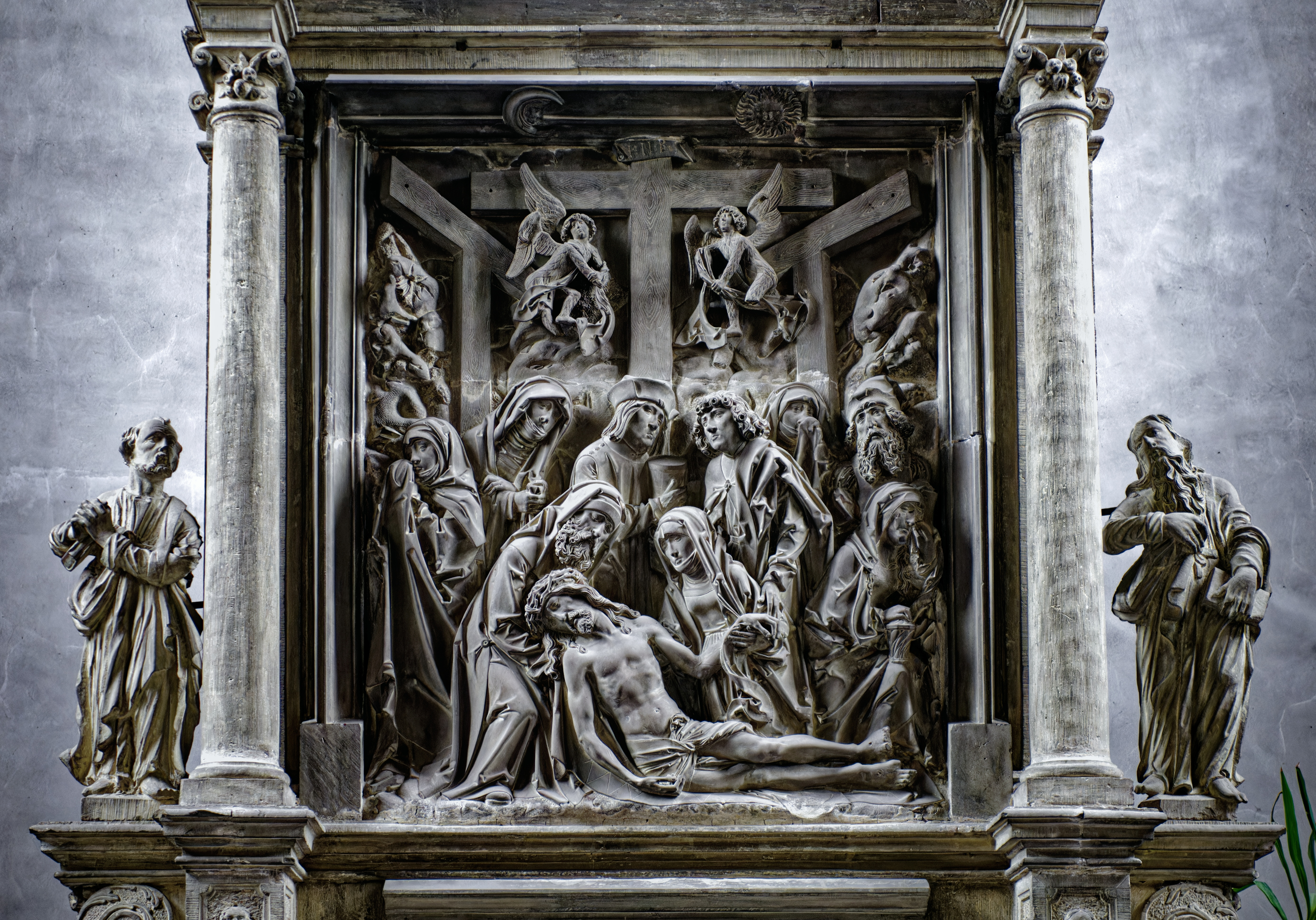
The Lamentation of Christ, cloister church of St. Afra, Maidbronn, 1525

== In literature ==
The character Goldmund in the 1930 book Narcissus and Goldmund by Hermann Hesse serves as an apprentice with a master sculptor who is socially prominent in the town where he worked and whose character appears to be loosely based on that of Riemenschneider. He serves both as an artistic inspiration for Goldmund and as a foil for the less restrained temperament of Goldmund. Hesse describes Riemenschneider's statue of Mary with child which resides in the Pfarrkirche St Burkard in Würzburg as: "Dreamily she gazes out from her glass case, far away from our world... in her gracefulness and distinction she is refined to a degree of perfection far above that of mankind today."

The plot of Elizabeth Peters's first Vicky Bliss mystery novel, Borrower of the Night (1973) centers around the search for a missing Riemenschneider sculpture. Most of the action takes place in Rothenburg ob der Tauber.

== Sources ==
- Michael Baxandall, The Limewood Sculptors of Renaissance Germany, New Haven, London: Yale University Press, 1980.
- Julien Chapuis (ed.), Tilman Riemenschneider: Master Sculptor of the Late Middle Ages, catalogue of the exhibition at National Gallery of Art, Washington, and Metropolitan Museum of Art, New York, Washington: NGA, 1999, ISBN 0-300-08162-6, PDF.
- Vincent Mayr, "Riemenschneider, Tilman" Grove Art Online. Oxford University Press, 2003, doi:10.1093/gao/9781884446054.article.T072085.
- Iris Kalden-Rosenfeld, Tilman Riemenschneider—The Sculptor and His Workshop, Königstein im Taunus: Langewiesche, 2004, ISBN 3-7845-3223-3 (Originally in German, 2001, revised edition 2019).
- Claudia Lichte, Jürgen Lenssen (eds.), Tilman Riemenschneider. Werke seiner Blütezeit / Werke seiner Glaubenswelt, booklet to the exhibition at Mainfränkisches Museum Würzburg and Cathedral Museum, Würzburg, 2004.
