= St. Peter and St. Paul's Church, Detwang =

Church in Detwang, Middle Franconia, Germany

Coordinates: 49°23′13″N 10°10′00″E

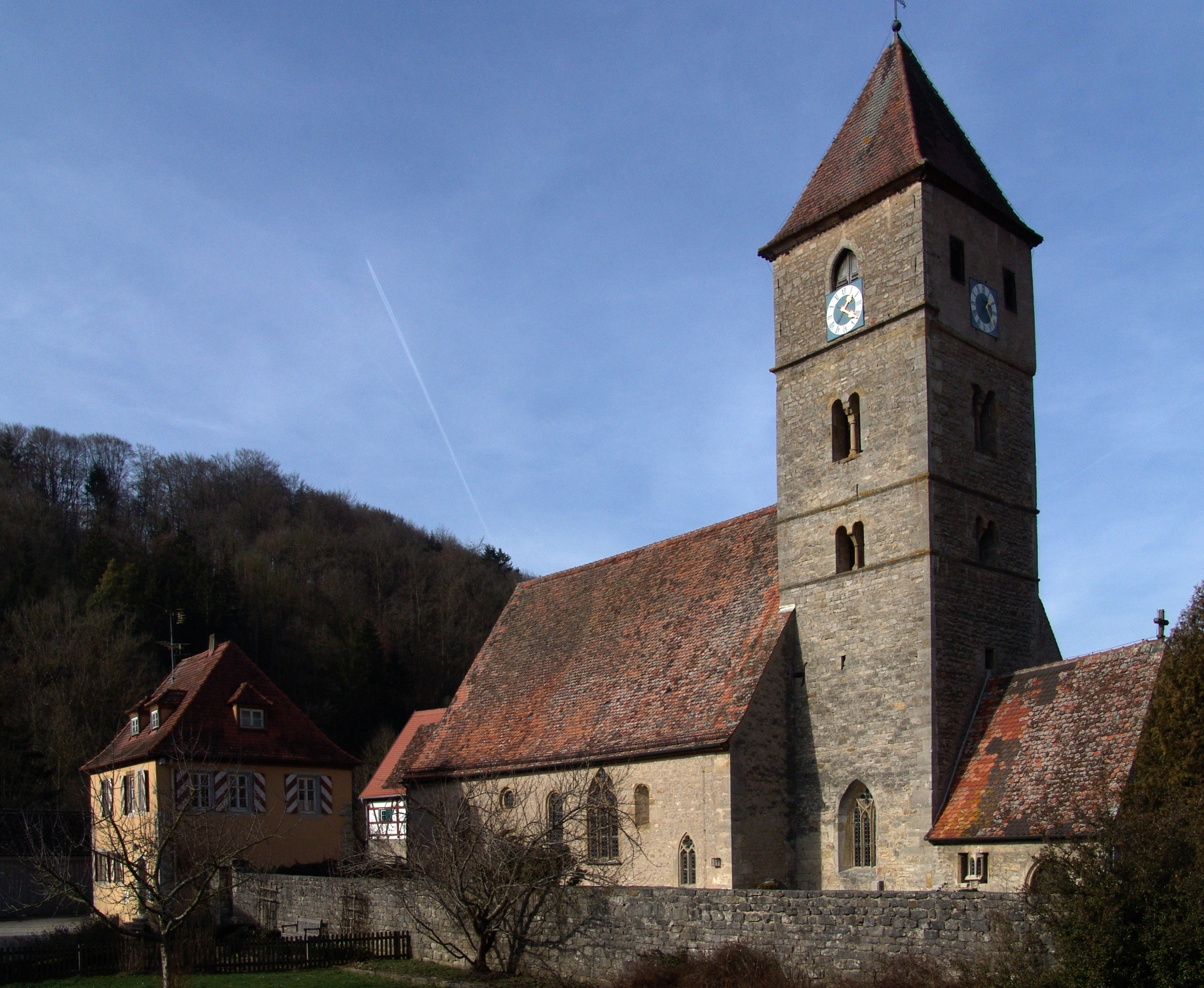
St. Peter and Paul Church

St. Peter and Paul is a Gothic church in the quarter of Detwang in the Bavarian tourist resort of Rothenburg ob der Tauber in the Tauber valley. The most important piece of artwork in the church is the crucifixion reredos by Tilman Riemenschneider. The church is a cultural heritage monument of Germany.

== Crucifixion reredos ==
Only fragments of the crucifixion copies have survived to the present day. It depicts the crucifixion of Christ but there is no record of its origin. However, it has been attributed to Tilman Riemenschneider and his workshop due to its close stylistic relationship to his other works. The sculptural decoration is dated to the years 1505 and 1508 and was therefore created at the same time as Creglingen's Marian reredos.

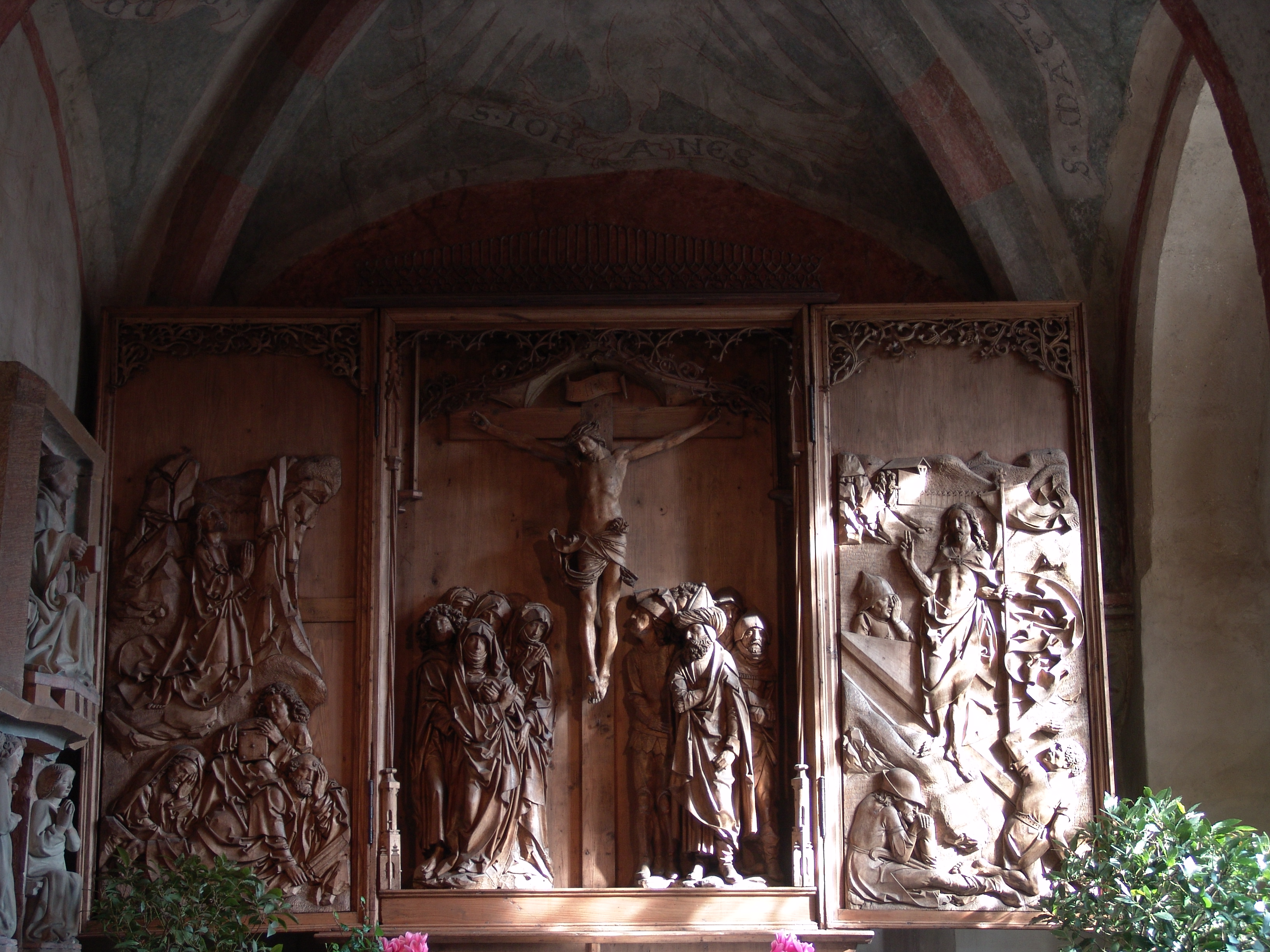
Crucifixion reredos, overall view

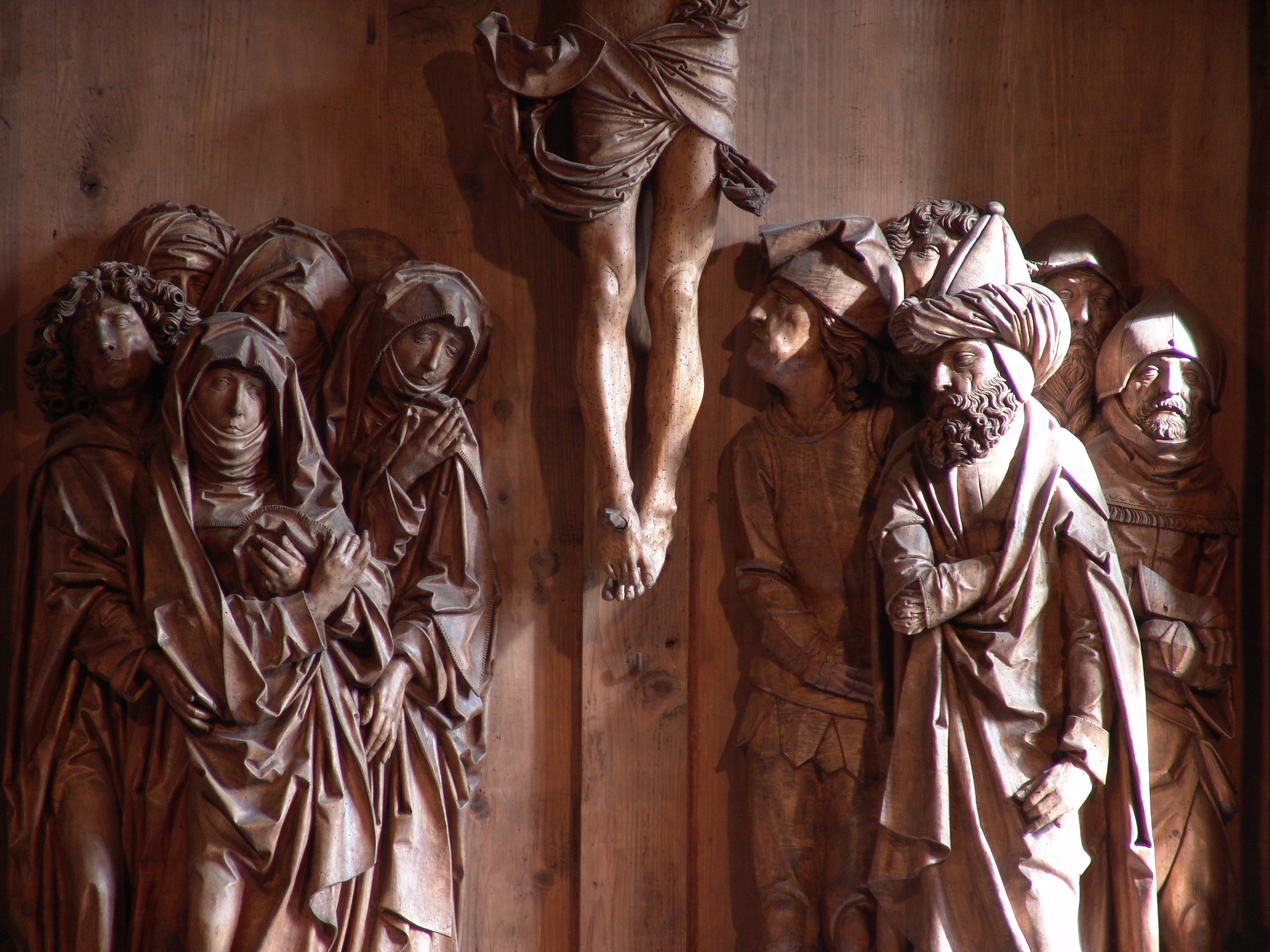
Crucifixion reredos, detail of the central group of figures

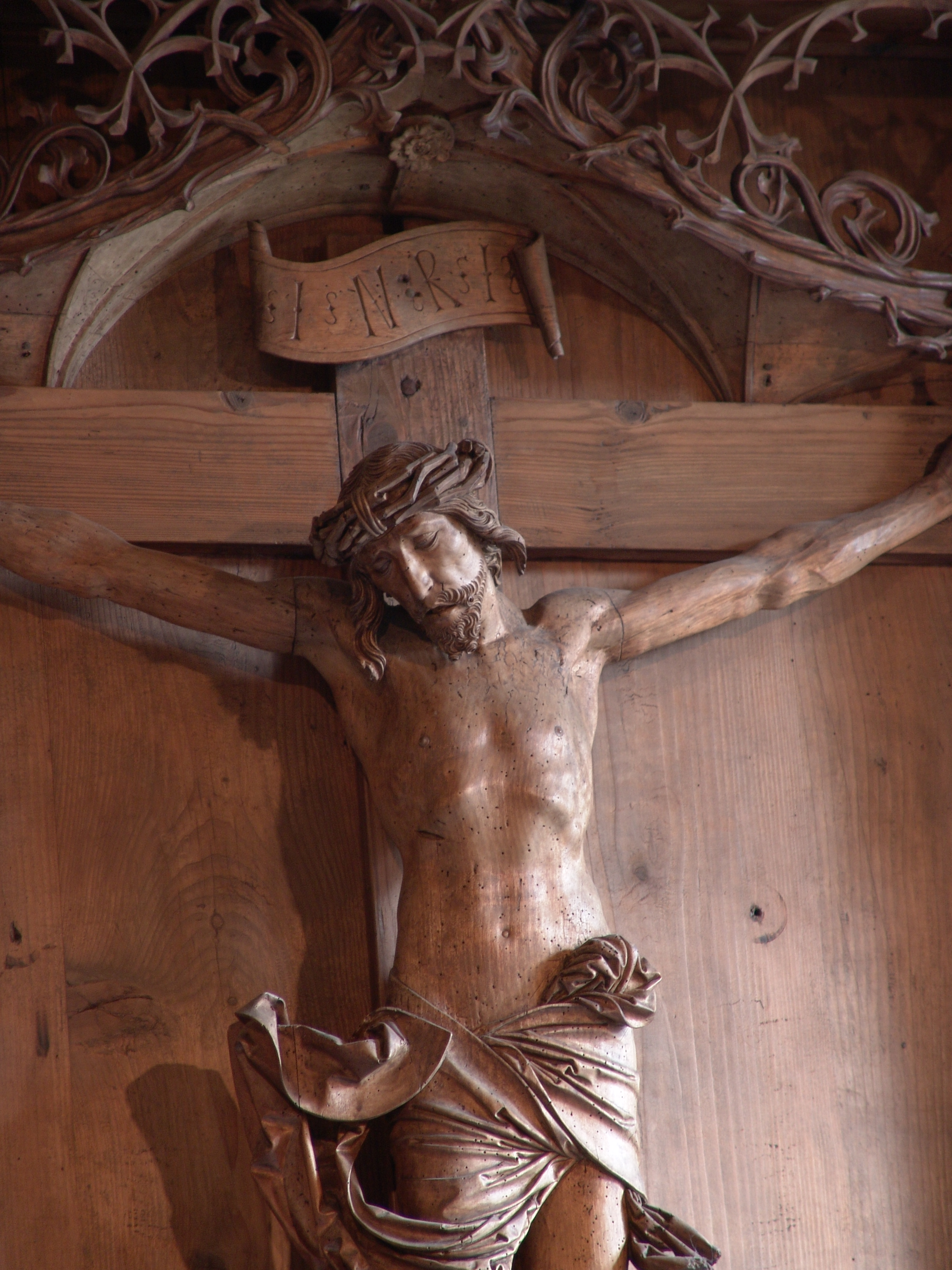
Crucifixion reredos, detail of Christ

== Sources ==
- Kalden-Rosenfeld, Iris (2011). Tilman Riemenschneider und seine Werkstatt: mit einem Katalog der allgemein als Arbeiten Riemenschneiders und seiner Werkstatt akzeptierten Werke (in German). Königstein im Taunus: Karl Robert Langewiesche (Königstein im Taunus). ISBN 978-3-7845-3224-0.
