= Seebenstein Madonna =

Sculpture by Tilman Riemenschneider

Seebenstein Madonna (Virgin and Child Enthroned)
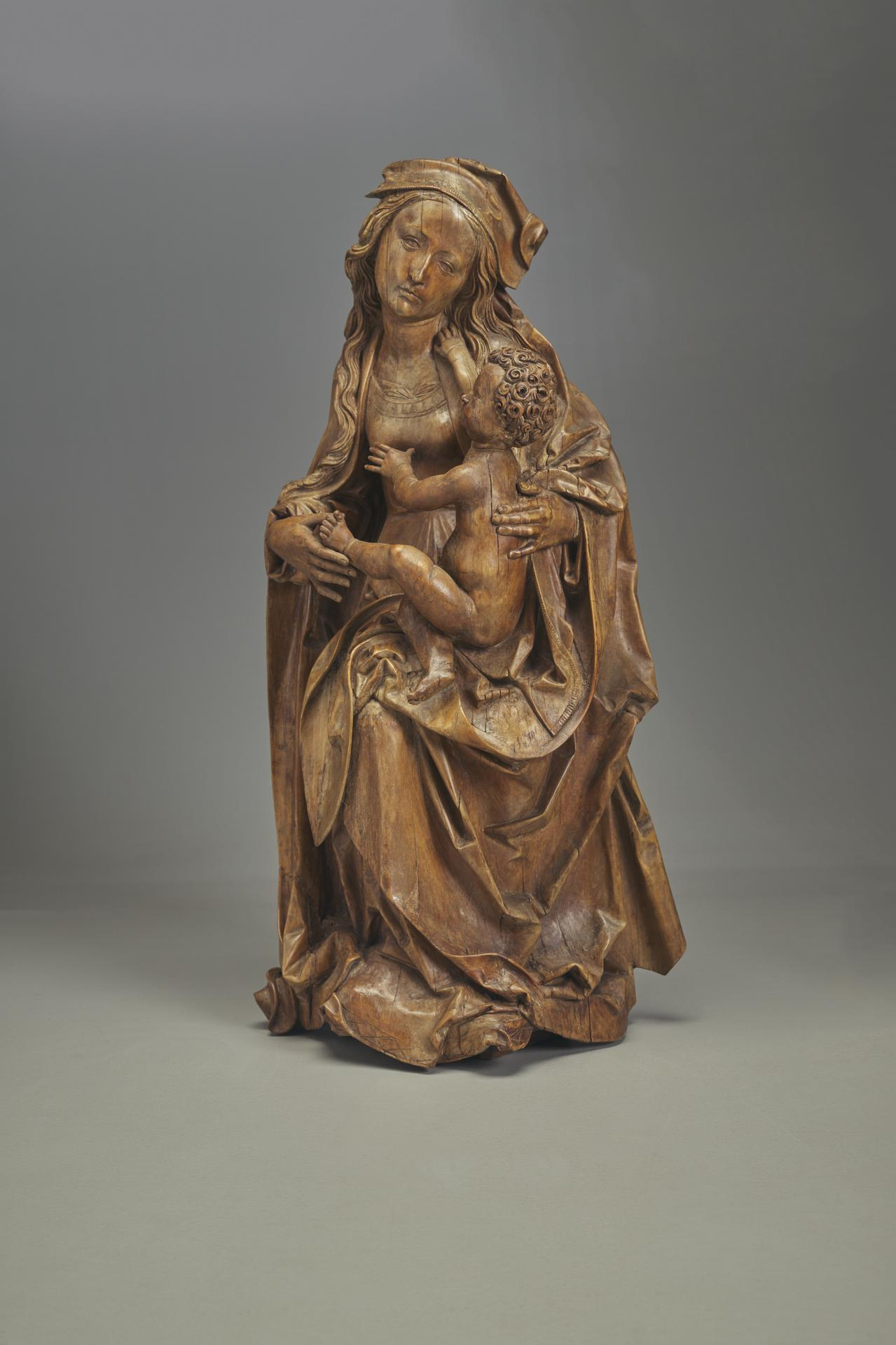
- Artist: Tilman Riemenschneider
- Completion date: 1495-1505
- Dimensions: 91.5 cm × 45 cm × 30 cm (36.0 in × 18 in × 12 in)
- Location: Yale University Art Gallery, New Haven, Connecticut
- Owner: Yale University
- Accession: 2025.19.1
- Website: https://artgallery.yale.edu/collections/objects/333721

The Seebenstein Madonna, alternatively titled Virgin and Child Enthroned is a wooden sculpture depicting the Madonna by German woodcarver Tilman Riemenschneider, carved approximately 1495-1505. Made with local Würzburg Limewood, the sculpture saw ownership under the House of Wittelsbach passed along by descent. A fixture of Burg Seebenstein, it was acquired by the Yale University Art Gallery, New Haven, Connecticut on 23 July 2025, and is on display at the European Art gallery as part of an effort to expand upon the art of the Northern Renaissance.

== Provenance ==
The sculpture was held as part of the collection of Prince Arnulf of Bavaria in his residence at Leopoldstein Castle in Styria, Austria. In 1907 it passed upon inheritance to his wife Princess Theresa of Liechtenstein, then to her nephew Franz Joseph II. Postcard at the time showed that it was on displayed under a canopy with two separate sculptures of angels holding a crown above the Virgin Mary's head.

In 1938, the Leopoldstein Castle was acquired by Reichsmarschall Hermann Göring, as a meeting location for his business partners. As a result, the sculpture was transferred to Stadtpalais Liechtenstein, then to the Gartenpalais Liechtenstein in 1940.

The sculpture saw ownership under Karoline "Lilly" Nehammer and Oskar Hamel, prominent art dealers under Nazi occupied Austria, who sought to decorate Burg Seebenstein, which they acquired for 115,000 Reichsmark. The Madonna was acquired as part of a shopping spree of properties once owned by nobles through a sale on 2 November 1942. In 15 August 1945, the sculpture was inventoried at the end of World War II as part of an audit of Nehammer's holdings, as she was investigated for goods stolen from Jewish families.

Nehammer saw full ownership of the sculpture after the death of Hamel, and the piece was passed thru descent to her grand-niece Christine Vopava Nehammer-Markus, who sold it to dealer Sam Fogg of London on 27 April 2023. The Yale University Art Gallery purchased the statue in 2025.

== Description ==
The sculpture is rendered in limewood, a favored medium for Riemenschneider, who is known to keep his sculptures unpainted to show off the texture and natural colors of the wood.

The Virgin Mary is depicted on a throne, adorned with flowing draperies, and the Christ Child is depicted reaching towards the Virgin with his right hand, as she supports the Child with her left hand, while gazing down. Riemenschneider's sculptures are known to render emotive, humanistic expressions onto wood, as well as emphasis on the natural grain of the wood. The back of the sculpture is hollowed out as to minimize cracking and splitting of the limewood.
