= Mary Salome and Zebedee =

1501–1505 altarpiece sculpture by Tilman Riemenschneider

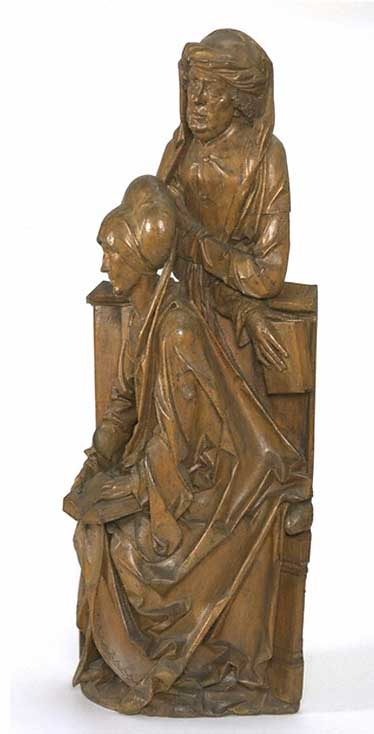
- Mary Salome and Zebedee, about 1505–1510, Tilman Riemenschneider V&A Museum no. 110-1878
- Artist: Tilman Riemenschneider
- Year: 1501–05
- Catalogue: 110-1878
- Medium: Wood
- Subject: Mary Salome and Zebedee
- Location: V&A Museum

Mary Salome and Zebedee is a wood sculpture by Tilman Riemenschneider.

Riemenschneider carved this sculpture in Würzburg between 1501–1505. It depicts Mary Salome – the half-sister of Mary, mother of Jesus – with her husband Zebedee. The sculpture originally formed the right side of an altarpiece showing the family of Mary, mother of Jesus. The central scene would have included Saint Anne with her daughter Mary and a baby depiction of Jesus Christ.

Riemenschneider was an important south German sculptor in the late fifteenth and sixteenth centuries. He was known for his limewood altarpieces. Some of his carvings were painted, while others including Mary Salome and Zebedee were glazed.

It is in the collection of the Victoria and Albert Museum.

== Description ==
Mary Salome is seated on a cushioned throne, turning her body to the left. In her right hand, she holds an open book on which her hand is resting. She is dressed in a waisted gown over which is draped a mantle falling from her left shoulder. The half-length figure of Zebedee stands behind her, resting on his left elbow, and holding a closed book in his right hand; he is expressively depicted as an elderly man with sunken cheeks. He is dressed in a buttoned robe.
