= Prince Heinrich of Bavaria (1922–1958) =

Bavarian prince (1922–1958)

Prince Heinrich
- Prince Heinrich of Bavaria
- Born: 28 March 1922; Schloss Hohenburg near Lenggries, Bavaria, Weimar Republic
- Died: 14 February 1958 (aged 35); San Carlos de Bariloche, Río Negro Province, Argentina
- Burial: Andechs Abbey cemetery, Bavaria
- Spouse: Anne Marie de Lustrac (m. 1951)
Names
- Heinrich Franz Wilhelm
- House: Wittelsbach
- Father: Rupprecht, Crown Prince of Bavaria
- Mother: Princess Antonia of Luxembourg

Prince Heinrich of Bavaria (German: Heinrich Franz Wilhelm Prinz von Bayern) (28 March 1922 – 14 February 1958) was a member of the Bavarian royal House of Wittelsbach.

== Early life ==
Heinrich was born at Schloss Hohenburg in Bavaria. He was the eldest child and only son of Rupprecht, Crown Prince of Bavaria and his second wife, Princess Antonia of Luxembourg, and had several younger sisters.

== Marriage and later life ==
On 31 July 1951 Prince Heinrich married Anne Marie de Lustrac (27 September 1927 – 16 August 1999). The wedding took place in Saint-Jean-de-Luz, France. The couple had no children.

Prince Heinrich was a Knight of the Order of Saint Hubert. He died in a car accident in San Carlos de Bariloche, Argentina, in the Andes on 14 February 1958. He is buried at the Andechs Abbey church in Bavaria. His widow, Anne Marie de Lustrac, later died in a car crash in Milan, Italy, on 16 August 1999.

== Ancestry ==
Ancestors of Prince Heinrich of Bavaria (1922–1958)

8. Luitpold, Prince Regent of Bavaria
4. Ludwig III of Bavaria
9. Archduchess Auguste Ferdinande of Austria
2. Rupprecht, Crown Prince of Bavaria
10. Archduke Ferdinand Karl Viktor of Austria-Este
5. Archduchess Maria Theresa of Austria-Este
11. Archduchess Elisabeth Franziska of Austria
1. Prince Heinrich of Bavaria
12. Adolphe, Grand Duke of Luxembourg
6. William IV, Grand Duke of Luxembourg
13. Princess Adelheid-Marie of Anhalt-Dessau
3. Princess Antonia of Luxembourg
14. Miguel I of Portugal
7. Infanta Marie Anne of Portugal
15. Princess Adelaide of Löwenstein-Wertheim-Rosenberg

== Sources ==
- Die Wittelsbacher. Geschichte unserer Familie. Adalbert, Prinz von Bayern. Prestel Verlag, München, 1979.
- The Book of Kings: A Royal Genealogy. C. Arnold McNaughton. Garnstone Press, London, 1973.
