= List of heirs to the throne of Luxembourg =

This page is a list of heirs to the throne of Luxembourg. The list includes all individuals who were considered to inherit the throne of Luxembourg, either as heir apparent or as heir presumptive, since the constitution of the Grand Duchy of Luxembourg on 15 March 1815. Those who actually succeeded as Grand Duke or Grand Duchess of Luxembourg are shown in bold.

The Grand Duchy of Luxembourg was created in 1815 by the Congress of Vienna and given to the new King of the United Kingdom of the Netherlands in exchange for his ancestral Principality of Orange-Nassau, which went to Prussia; as a result, the first Grand Dukes of Luxembourg were Dutch kings also, and their heirs were eligible for both thrones. This union began to crack in 1884, when the last son of the King-Grand Duke died, leaving no male heir in the Orange-Nassau line. While the King's daughter Wilhelmina could (and would) inherit the Dutch throne, Luxembourg, a "German" territory, followed the Nassau Family Pact of 1783, wherein Salic law (barring females from inheriting) applied. Instead, the throne passed to the only remaining branch of the Nassau family, the House of Nassau-Weilburg.

This branch would face a similar situation only twenty years later: the Grand Duke had six daughters but no sons, and had deemed his cousins the Counts of Merenberg, issue of a morganatic marriage, illegible to inherit the throne. Instead (to the protest of the Count of Merenberg), he instituted a solution, whereby his daughters (and their male heirs) became eligible to succeed.

In 2011 the law of succession was changed to allow women to inherit the throne with equal right to men.

Heirs to the Luxembourgish throne
In personal union with the Kingdom of the Netherlands (1815–1890)
Monarch	Heir	Relationship to monarch	Became heir (Date; Reason)	Ceased to be heir (Date; Reason)	Next in line of succession
Willem I	**Prince Willem, Prince of Orange**	Son	16 March 1815; Father became grand duke	7 October 1840; Father abdicated, became grand duke	Prince Frederik, 1815–1817, brother
Willem I	**Prince Willem, Prince of Orange**	Son	16 March 1815; Father became grand duke	7 October 1840; Father abdicated, became grand duke	**Prince Willem**, 1817–1840, son
Willem II	**Prince Willem, Prince of Orange**	Son	7 October 1840; Father became grand duke	17 March 1849; Father died, became grand duke	Prince Willem, son
Willem III	Prince Willem, Prince of Orange	Son	17 March 1849; Father became grand duke	11 June 1879; Died	Prince Maurits, 1849–1850, brother
Willem III	Prince Willem, Prince of Orange	Son	17 March 1849; Father became grand duke	11 June 1879; Died	Prince Hendrik, 1850–1851, uncle
Willem III	Prince Willem, Prince of Orange	Son	17 March 1849; Father became grand duke	11 June 1879; Died	Prince Alexander, 1851–1879, brother
Willem III	Prince Alexander, Prince of Orange	Son	11 June 1879; Brother died	21 June 1884; Died	Prince Frederik, 1879–1881, granduncle
Willem III	Prince Alexander, Prince of Orange	Son	11 June 1879; Brother died	21 June 1884; Died	**Adolph, Duke of Nassau**, 1881–1884, 18th cousin (Note: Senior heir of the Nassau-Weilburg branch, family relationship traced back to Henry II, Count of Nassau.)
Willem III	**Adolph, Duke of Nassau**	17th cousin once-removed	21 June 1884; 18th cousin died	23 November 1890; 17th cousin once-removed died, became grand duke	**Hereditary Prince Wilhelm of Nassau**, son
After the personal union (1890–present)
Monarch	Heir	Relationship to monarch	Became heir (Date; Reason)	Ceased to be heir (Date; Reason)	Next in line of succession
Adolphe	**Hereditary Grand Duke Guillaume**	Son	23 November 1890; Father became grand duke	17 November 1905; Father died, became grand duke	Prince Nikolaus Wilhelm of Nassau, 1890–1905, half-uncle
Adolphe	**Hereditary Grand Duke Guillaume**	Son	23 November 1890; Father became grand duke	17 November 1905; Father died, became grand duke	None, 1905
Guillaume IV	None, 1905–1907				
Guillaume IV	**Hereditary Grand Duchess Marie-Adélaïde**	Daughter	10 July 1907; Guillaume IV's daughters and their heirs male declared eligible	25 February 1912; Father died, became grand duchess	**Princess Charlotte**, sister
Marie-Adélaïde	**Princess Charlotte**	Sister	25 February 1912; Sister became grand duchess	14 January 1919; Sister abdicated, became grand duchess	Princess Hilda, sister
Charlotte	Princess Hilda	Sister	14 January 1919; Sister became grand duchess	5 January 1921; Son born to grand duchess	Princess Antoinette, sister
Charlotte	**Hereditary Grand Duke Jean**	Son	5 January 1921; Born	12 November 1964; Mother abdicated, became grand duke	Princess Hilda, 1921–1927, aunt
Charlotte	**Hereditary Grand Duke Jean**	Son	5 January 1921; Born	12 November 1964; Mother abdicated, became grand duke	Prince Charles, 1927–1955, brother
Charlotte	**Hereditary Grand Duke Jean**	Son	5 January 1921; Born	12 November 1964; Mother abdicated, became grand duke	**Prince Henri**, 1955–1964, son
Jean	**Hereditary Grand Duke Henri**	Son	12 November 1964; Father became grand duke	7 October 2000; Father abdicated, became grand duke	Prince Jean, 1964–1981, brother
Jean	**Hereditary Grand Duke Henri**	Son	12 November 1964; Father became grand duke	7 October 2000; Father abdicated, became grand duke	**Prince Guillaume**, 1981–2000, son
Henri	**Hereditary Grand Duke Guillaume**	Son	7 October 2000; Father became grand duke	3 October 2025; Father abdicated, became grand duke	Prince Félix, 2000–2020, brother
Henri	**Hereditary Grand Duke Guillaume**	Son	7 October 2000; Father became grand duke	3 October 2025; Father abdicated, became grand duke	Prince Charles, 2020–2025, son
Guillaume V	Prince Charles	Son	3 October 2025; Father became grand duke	Incumbent	Prince François, brother

== See also ==
- Line of succession to the Luxembourger throne
