= Infanta Marie Anne of Portugal =

Grand Duchess of Luxembourg from 1905 to 1912

Marie Anne of Portugal
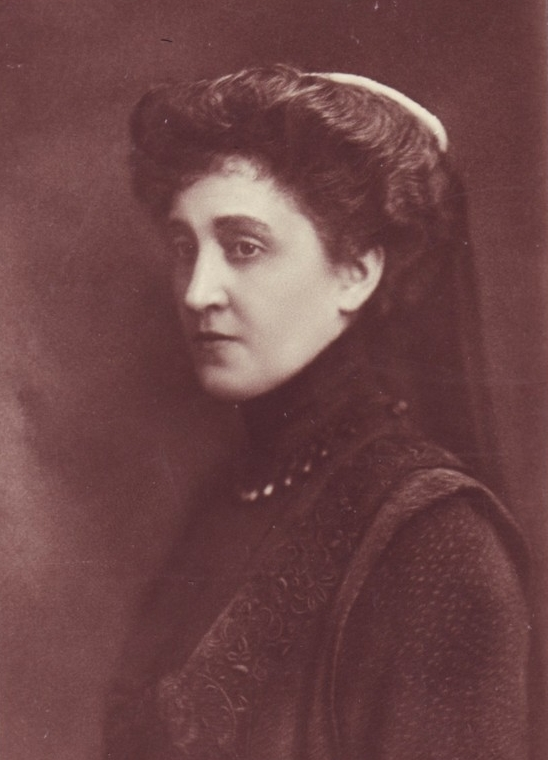
- Marie Anna, c. 1894

Grand Duchess consort of Luxembourg
- Tenure: 17 November 1905 – 25 February 1912

Regent of Luxembourg
- Regency: 19 November 1908 – 18 June 1912
- Monarchs: William IV; Marie-Adélaïde
- Born: 13 July 1861; Bronnbach Castle, Wertheim am Main, Kingdom of Württemberg, German Confederation
- Died: 31 July 1942 (aged 81); New York City, U.S.
- Burial: Notre-Dame Cathedral, Luxembourg
- Spouse: William IV, Grand Duke of Luxembourg (m. 1893; died 1912)
- Issue: Marie-Adélaïde, Grand Duchess of Luxembourg; Charlotte, Grand Duchess of Luxembourg; Hilda, Princess of Schwarzenberg; Antonia, Crown Princess of Bavaria; Elisabeth, Princess of Thurn and Taxis; Sophie, Princess of Saxony
Names
- Maria Ana do Carmo Henrique Teresa Adelaide Joana Carolina Inês Sofia Eulália Leopoldina Isabel Bernardina Micaela Gabriela Rafaela Francisca de Assis e de Paula Inácia Gonzaga
- House: Braganza
- Father: Miguel I of Portugal
- Mother: Adelaide of Löwenstein

Infanta Marie Anne of Portugal (Portuguese: Maria Ana de Portugal; born Maria Ana do Carmo Henrique Teresa Adelaide Joana Carolina Inês Sofia Eulália Leopoldina Isabel Bernardina Micaela Gabriela Rafaela Francisca de Assis e de Paula Inácia Gonzaga; 13 July 1861 – 31 July 1942) was Grand Duchess of Luxembourg as the wife of Grand Duke William IV. She was the regent of Luxembourg between 1908 and 1912; first during the illness of her spouse, and then in the name of their daughter, Grand Duchess Marie-Adélaïde.

== Family ==
Born at Schloss Bronnbach in Bronnbach, Kingdom of Württemberg, Infanta Marie Anne (or Maria Ana) was the fifth child and second-youngest daughter of the deposed King Miguel of Portugal and his wife Princess Adelaide of Löwenstein. She was a member of the House of Braganza. At the time of her birth, her father had been exiled, and the family lived as guests in the Austro-Hungarian Empire.

In spite of their circumstances, the daughters of Princess Adélaïde and Miguel made royal marriages, some to reigning monarchs and deposed heads of Roman Catholic European dynasties.

== Marriage and children ==
Before her marriage with William IV, Grand Duke of Luxembourg, she was considered by Emperor Franz Joseph I of Austria as a suitable bride to his only son, Crown Prince Rudolf, but Rudolf did not like her, and she remained single for the next years.

Maria Ana was married on 21 June 1893 at Schloss Fischhorn, Zell am See, to the Protestant Wilhelm, Hereditary Grand Duke of Luxembourg, the son and heir apparent of Adolf, Grand Duke of Luxembourg, head of the House of Nassau. It was agreed that the children would be raised in their mother's Catholic faith, the religion of the overwhelming majority of Luxembourg's population.

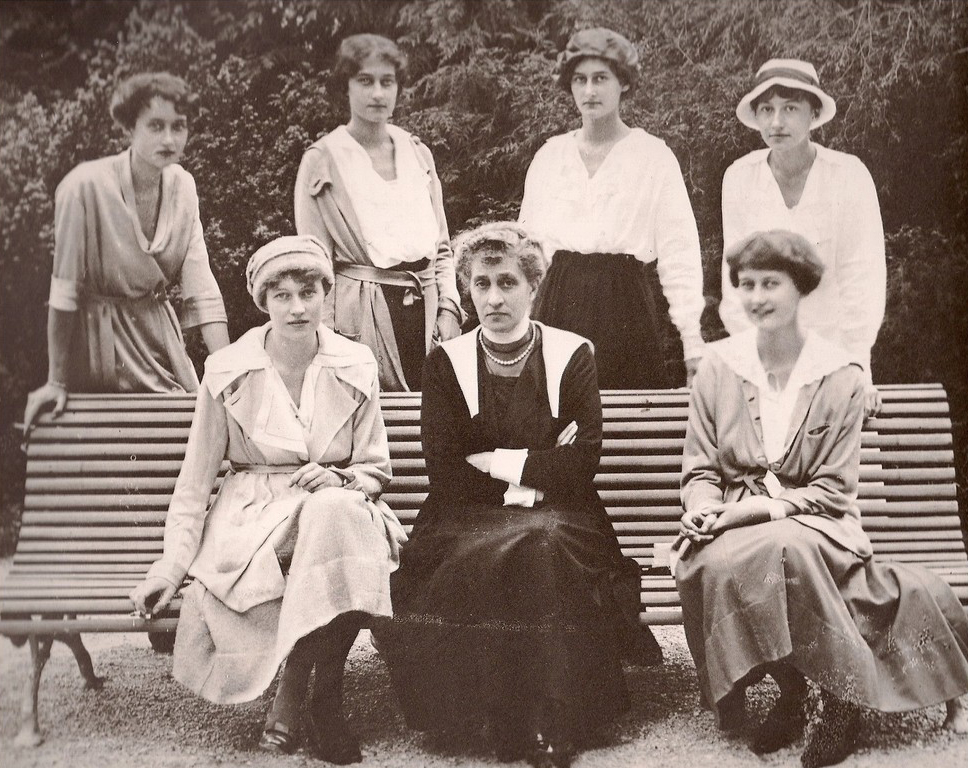
Marie Anne with her daughters, August 1920

The couple had six daughters:

- Marie-Adélaïde, Grand Duchess of Luxembourg (1894–1924), who remained unmarried and childless
- Charlotte, Grand Duchess of Luxembourg (1896–1985), who married her first cousin Prince Felix of Bourbon-Parma, a son of Marie Anne's younger sister.
- Princess Hilda (15 February 1897 in Berg Castle – 8 September 1979 in Berg Castle), married in Berg Castle on 29 October 1930 Adolf 10te Fürst zu Schwarzenberg (18 August 1890 in Frauenberg – 27 February 1950 in Bordighera), without issue
- Princess Antonia (1899–1954), who married Rupprecht, Crown Prince of Bavaria as his second wife
- Princess Elisabeth (7 March 1901 in Luxembourg – 2 August 1950 in Schloss Hohenburg), married in Schloss Hohenburg on 14 November 1922 Prince Ludwig Philipp of Thurn and Taxis (2 February 1901 in Regensburg – 22 April 1933 in Schloss Niederaichbach), son of Albert I, Prince of Thurn and Taxis, and had issue
- Princess Sophie (14 February 1902 in Berg Castle – 24 May 1941 in Munich), married at Schloss Hohenburg on 12 April 1921 Prince Ernst Heinrich of Saxony (9 December 1896 in Dresden – 14 June 1971 in Edingen-Neckarhausen, West Germany), youngest son of King Frederick Augustus III of Saxony, and had issue

== Grand Duchess and regent ==
Wilhelm IV became grand duke on the death of his father on 17 November 1905, and Marie Anne became grand duchess. Because Wilhelm was the last agnate of the House of Nassau, he had Marie-Adélaïde confirmed and proclaimed heir presumptive on 10 July 1907.

Marie Anne was regent for her husband during his terminal illness from 19 November 1908 to 15 February 1912. She then continued as regent for her daughter, Grand Duchess Marie-Adélaïde, during her minority from 25 February 1912 to 18 June 1912. Marie-Adélaïde eventually abdicated in favor of her younger sister, Marie Anne's second daughter Charlotte in 1919.

During World War II the grand ducal family left Luxembourg shortly before the arrival of Nazi troops, settling in France until their capitulation, in June 1940.

Subsequently, the family and Grand Duchess Charlotte's ministers received transit visas to Portugal from the Portuguese consul Aristides de Sousa Mendes, in June 1940. After travelling through Coimbra and Lisbon, the family first stayed in Cascais, in Casa de Santa Maria, owned by Manuel Espírito Santo, who was then the honorary consul for Luxembourg in Portugal. By July they had moved to Monte Estoril, staying at the Chalet Posser de Andrade. Marie Anne stayed in Monte Estoril with her daughter, the Grand Duchess Charlotte, until 3 October 1940. On the same day, they boarded the Pan Am Yankee Clipper headed for New York City, from where they then left for Canada. With them travelled Prince Félix's aide de camp Guillaume Konsbruck, his wife Nelly and their sons, Guy and Carlo.

== Death ==
Marie Anne died in exile in New York on 31 July 1942. She was buried in the Kapelle des Calvary-Cemetery, New York, until 1947, when her body was transferred to the Notre-Dame Cathedral, Luxembourg.

== See also ==
- Descendants of Miguel I of Portugal

Infanta Marie Anne of Portugal House of Braganza Cadet branch of the House of Aviz Born: 13 July 1861 Died: 31 July 1942
Luxembourgish royalty
Preceded by Princess Adelheid-Marie of Anhalt-Dessau	Grand Duchess consort of Luxembourg; 1905–1912	Vacant Title next held by Prince Felix of Bourbon-Parma as prince consort
