= Princess Antonia of Luxembourg =

Last Crown Princess of Bavaria (1899–1954)

Princess Antonia
- Crown Princess of Bavaria
- Antonia in c. 1921
- Born: 7 October 1899; Schloss Hohenburg, Lenggries, Bavaria
- Died: 31 July 1954 (aged 54); Lenzerheide, Graubünden, Switzerland
- Burial: Basilica of Santa Maria in Domnica
- Spouse: Rupprecht, Crown Prince of Bavaria (m. 1921)
- Issue: Prince Heinrich; Princess Irmingard; Princess Editha; Princess Hilda; Princess Gabrielle, Duchess of Croÿ; Princess Sophie, Duchess of Arenberg
Names
- Antoinette Roberte Sophie Wilhelmine
- House: Nassau-Weilburg
- Father: William IV, Grand Duke of Luxembourg
- Mother: Marie Anne of Portugal

Antoinette Roberte Sophie Wilhelmine (7 October 1899 – 31 July 1954), commonly referred to as Antonia, was the last Crown Princess of Bavaria. By birth, she was a member of the Luxembourgish House of Nassau-Weilburg, as the daughter of Guillaume IV, Grand Duke of Luxembourg, and Infanta Marie Anne of Portugal. She married Rupprecht, Crown Prince of Bavaria in 1921 and had six children.

During the Second World War, Antonia was arrested by the Gestapo because of her husband's opposition to Adolf Hitler. She was held in a hospital in Jena under an assumed name and subjected to severe mistreatment before being rescued in April 1945. Her wartime imprisonment left her with lasting health problems, and she died in Switzerland in 1954.

== Family and early life ==
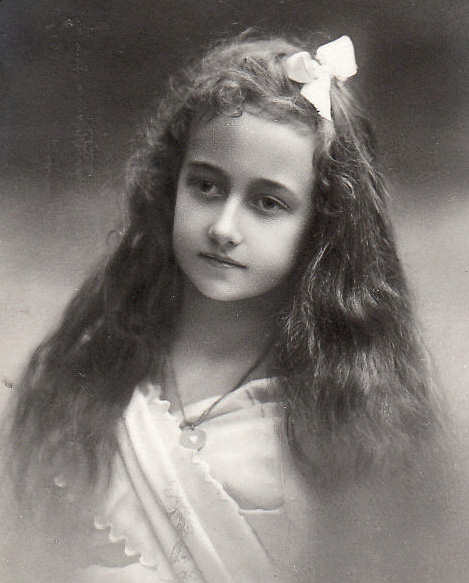
Princess Antonia at the age of 10 (Atelier Elvira, Munich 1909)

Born at Schloss Hohenburg, at Lenggries in Upper Bavaria, Antonia was the fourth daughter of Guillaume IV, Grand Duke of Luxembourg, who reigned between 1905 and 1912, and Marie Anne, a princess of the Portuguese House of Braganza. She was born on 7 October 1899 and baptised in the castle chapel three days later.

Schloss Hohenburg served as the summer residence of the Grand Ducal Family of Luxembourg. The family also maintained its principal residence at Schloss Berg in Luxembourg. Antonia and her sisters spent much of their childhood between Luxembourg and Bavaria. During renovations to Schloss Berg, Hohenburg became the family's permanent residence for several years.

She was the younger sister of two successive grand duchesses: Marie-Adélaïde and Charlotte. She also had three other sisters, Elisabeth, Hilda and Sophie. In the family she was called "Toni".

Antonia was described as particularly talented in several fields. She had considerable artistic and musical abilities and studied at the University of Music in Munich. She was also athletic and an accomplished figure skater. Her upbringing was closely connected to Bavaria through the family's residence at Hohenburg and its associations with the Bavarian royal family.

== Marriage and children ==
Antonia with her husband, Crown Prince Rupprecht in 1918

Antonia became the second wife of Rupprecht, Crown Prince of Bavaria. The two first became engaged on 26 August 1918. Rupprecht was a widower, thirty years older than Antonia, and was a prominent military commander who had served as a Generalfeldmarschall in the Imperial German army during the First World War. He had commanded the German Sixth Army at the Battle of Lorraine.

Their engagement attracted criticism because of the close connections between the Luxembourgish Grand Ducal Family and the royalty of the German Empire, particularly while Luxembourg was occupied by Germany. The relationship also became a political embarrassment for Antonia's elder sister, Grand Duchess Marie-Adélaïde, who faced criticism over her perceived connections with Germany.

Following the German Revolution and the abolition of the Bavarian monarchy, Rupprecht's position changed considerably. His father, Ludwig III of Bavaria, lost his throne, and Rupprecht became a crown prince without a reigning kingdom. The political uncertainty and the end of the monarchy led him to break off the engagement in the summer of 1919. Antonia was deeply disappointed by the separation.

The two subsequently resumed their relationship. They met again during an excursion in the Alps in 1920, and their engagement was renewed in February 1921. Antonia was reportedly willing to marry Rupprecht despite his loss of the throne and the political uncertainty surrounding the former Bavarian royal family.

The two were married on 7 April 1921 at Schloss Hohenburg, Antonia's birthplace and the summer residence of her family. Following their marriage, they initially lived in a villa in Berchtesgaden, before moving to the former Crown Prince's Palace in Munich. They also spent time at their residences in Bavaria, including Schloss Leustetten.

Although Bavaria had become a republic in 1918, Antonia continued to be known as Crown Princess of Bavaria through her marriage. She was less interested in formal court appearances and representative duties than in family life and the outdoors. She enjoyed spending time in the Bavarian countryside, particularly at an alpine hut with her children.

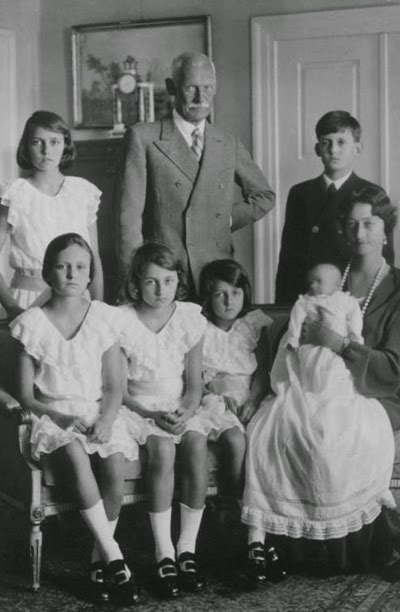
Antonia and Rupprecht with their six children, 1935

Antonia and Rupprecht had six children:

- Prince Heinrich Franz Wilhelm of Bavaria (28 March 1922 – 14 February 1958) he married Anne Marie de Lustrac on 31 July 1951.
- Princess Irmingard Marie Josefa of Bavaria (29 May 1923 – 23 October 2010) she married Prince Ludwig of Bavaria on 20 July 1950. They have three children.
- Princess Editha Marie Gabrielle Anna of Bavaria (16 September 1924 – 4 May 2013) married Tito Tomasso Maria Brunetti on 12 November 1946. They had three daughters. She remarried Professor Gustav Christian Schimert on 29 December 1959. They have three sons.
- Princess Hilda Hildegard Marie Gabriele of Bavaria (24 March 1926 – 5 May 2002) married Juan Bradstock Lockett de Loayza on 12 February 1949. They had four children.
- Princess Gabriele Adelgunde Marie Theresia Antonia of Bavaria (10 May 1927 – 19 April 2019) married Karl Emmanuel Herzog von Croÿ, later 14th Duke of Croÿ on 17 June 1953. They have three children.
- Princess Sophie Marie Therese of Bavaria (born 20 June 1935) married Jean, 12th Duke of Arenberg on 18 January 1955. They have five children.

== World War II ==
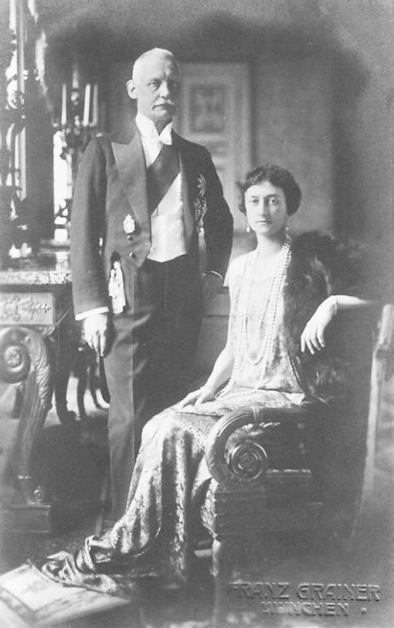
Antonia and Rupprecht before the war, c. 1935

Antonia and Rupprecht were opponents of Nazism. Rupprecht refused to support the Nazi regime and remained a prominent figure among Bavarian monarchists. The Nazi authorities monitored the family and regarded Rupprecht as a potential focus for opposition to Hitler. In 1939–1940, the family left Germany and eventually settled in Italy. Antonia lived with their children in northern Italy, while Rupprecht maintained contacts with opponents of the Nazi regime.

Following the 20 July 1944 assassination attempt against Adolf Hitler, Rupprecht and their son Heinrich went into hiding in Italy. The Nazi authorities suspected Rupprecht of involvement in opposition to Hitler and intensified their efforts to locate him. Under the policy of Sippenhaft, relatives could be detained as a means of punishing or pressuring a suspected opponent. The Gestapo consequently targeted members of the Wittelsbach family in an attempt to obtain information about Rupprecht.

On 27 July 1944, the Gestapo arrested Antonia and several of her daughters at San Martino di Castrozza in northern Italy. In a letter to her father dated 4 September 1945, her daughter Princess Hilda recalled that the Gestapo questioned the family about Rupprecht's whereabouts and his contacts with Claus von Stauffenberg. Hilda wrote that her mother was repeatedly interrogated and subjected to intensive questioning, while the daughters were also questioned several times.

The family was moved between locations in the Italian Alps before being transported to Germany. Antonia became seriously ill with pleurisy and a high fever. Although military doctors initially considered her unfit to travel, she was taken to Innsbruck on 5 October 1944 and admitted to hospital. Her daughter Princess Irmingard, who had been arrested separately near Lake Garda, was also brought to the hospital. Irmingard had contracted typhus and had a fever of 41°C. Antonia's other daughters were separated from her and taken to Germany. On 13 October 1944, they were imprisoned in the special prisoners' compound at Sachsenhausen concentration camp.

The Innsbruck hospital was evacuated shortly before Christmas 1944 because of Allied bombing. Antonia and the other patients were moved to Seefeld in Tirol. In early January 1945, the Gestapo took Antonia and Irmingard by train to Germany. They were separated at Weimar: Irmingard was taken to Berlin for questioning and subsequently sent to Sachsenhausen, where she was reunited with her sisters. Antonia was detained separately in a hospital in Jena, where she was held under the assumed name "Albertine Bingen".

Antonia's detention in Jena was accompanied by severe mistreatment. According to historian Volker Koop, who draws on an account based on a letter by her daughter Princess Hilda, Antonia was tormented for months by a nurse whom he describes as morphine-addicted. The nurse subjected her to deliberate food deprivation, leaving the already seriously ill princess in an increasingly weakened condition.

In late April 1945, a Luxembourg Red Cross delegation located Antonia in Jena. She was found under the assumed name "Albertine Bingen" and was so severely weakened that she weighed approximately 32 kilograms (72 lb). After identifying her, the Luxembourgish officer immediately notified her sister, Grand Duchess Charlotte, who arranged for her evacuation. Her brother-in-law, Prince Felix of Luxembourg, travelled by car to Jena and personally escorted Antonia back to Luxembourg. There, Charlotte arranged medical care and a place for her to recuperate. Antonia's children were reunited with her in May 1945, after their own imprisonment and transfers through Flossenbürg concentration camp and Dachau concentration camp.

== Later life and death ==
Antonia and her children shortly after the war, late 1940s

Antonia rarely spoke publicly about her wartime experiences. The physical and psychological consequences of her imprisonment continued to affect her after the war, and she never fully recovered her health. She reportedly made a solemn promise never to set foot on German soil again, a decision she maintained for the remainder of her life.

Following her recovery in Luxembourg, she spent much of her remaining life in Italy and Switzerland. She particularly enjoyed the area around Lake Como in northern Italy, where she spent time with members of her family. Her health remained poor, and she was eventually diagnosed with cancer.

Antonia died on 31 July 1954 at Lenzerheide, in the Swiss canton of Graubünden, aged 54. Her death came nine years after the end of the Second World War. Her husband, Rupprecht, died on 2 August 1955, little more than a year after her death. Antonia was buried, in accordance with her wishes, in the Basilica of Santa Maria in Domnica (also known as Santa Maria della Navicella) in Rome. Her heart was buried separately in the Chapel of Grace at Altötting on 13 November 1954.

== Bibliography ==
- Schlim, Jean Louis. Antonia von Luxemburg: Bayerns letzte Kronprinzessin. München: LangenMüller, 2006. ISBN 3-7844-3048-1.
- Thewes, Guy (July 2003). Les gouvernements du Grand-Duché de Luxembourg depuis 1848 (PDF) (in French) (Édition limitée ed.). Luxembourg City: Service Information et Presse. ISBN 2-87999-118-8.

Princess Antonia of Luxembourg House of Nassau-Weilburg Born: 7 October 1899 Died: 31 July 1954
Titles in pretence
Vacant Title last held by Maria Theresa of Austria-Este	— TITULAR — Queen consort of Bavaria; 7 April 1921 - 31 July 1954; Reason for succession failure: Kingdom abolished in 1918	Vacant Title next held by Countess Maria Draskovich of Trakostjan
Vacant Title last held by Ludwig III of Bavaria as Prince consort	— TITULAR — Queen consort of England, Scotland and Ireland; 7 April 1921 - 31 July 1954; Reason for succession failure: Glorious Revolution	Vacant Title next held by Countess Maria Draskovich of Trakostjan
