= Rupprecht, Crown Prince of Bavaria =

Last Crown Prince of Bavaria

Rupprecht
- Crown Prince of Bavaria
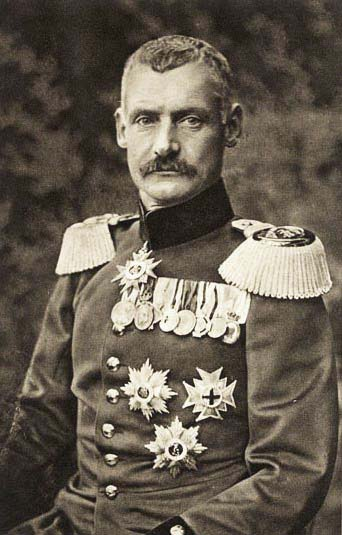
- Rupprecht in uniform prior to World War I

Head of the House of Wittelsbach
- Tenure: 18 October 1921 – 2 August 1955
- Predecessor: Ludwig III
- Successor: Albrecht
- Born: 18 May 1869; Munich, Kingdom of Bavaria
- Died: 2 August 1955 (aged 86); Schloß Leutstetten, Starnberg, Free State of Bavaria, West Germany
- Burial: Theatine Church, Munich
- Spouse: Duchess Marie Gabrielle in Bavaria (m. 1900; died 1912) Princess Antonia of Luxembourg (m. 1921; died 1954)
- Issue: Luitpold, Hereditary Prince of Bavaria; Princess Irmingard; Albrecht, Duke of Bavaria; Prince Rudolf; Prince Heinrich; Princess Irmingard; Princess Editha; Princess Hilda; Princess Gabrielle, Duchess of Croÿ; Princess Sophie, Duchess of Arenberg
- House: Wittelsbach
- Father: Ludwig III of Bavaria
- Mother: Archduchess Maria Theresia of Austria-Este

Rupprecht, Crown Prince of Bavaria, Duke of Bavaria, Franconia and in Swabia, Count Palatine by the Rhine (Rupprecht Maria Luitpold Ferdinand; English: Rupert Maria Leopold Ferdinand; 18 May 1869 – 2 August 1955), was the last heir apparent to the Bavarian throne. During the first half of World War I, he commanded the 6th Army on the Western Front. From August 1916, he commanded Army Group Rupprecht of Bavaria, which occupied the sector of the front opposite the British Expeditionary Force.

== Childhood ==
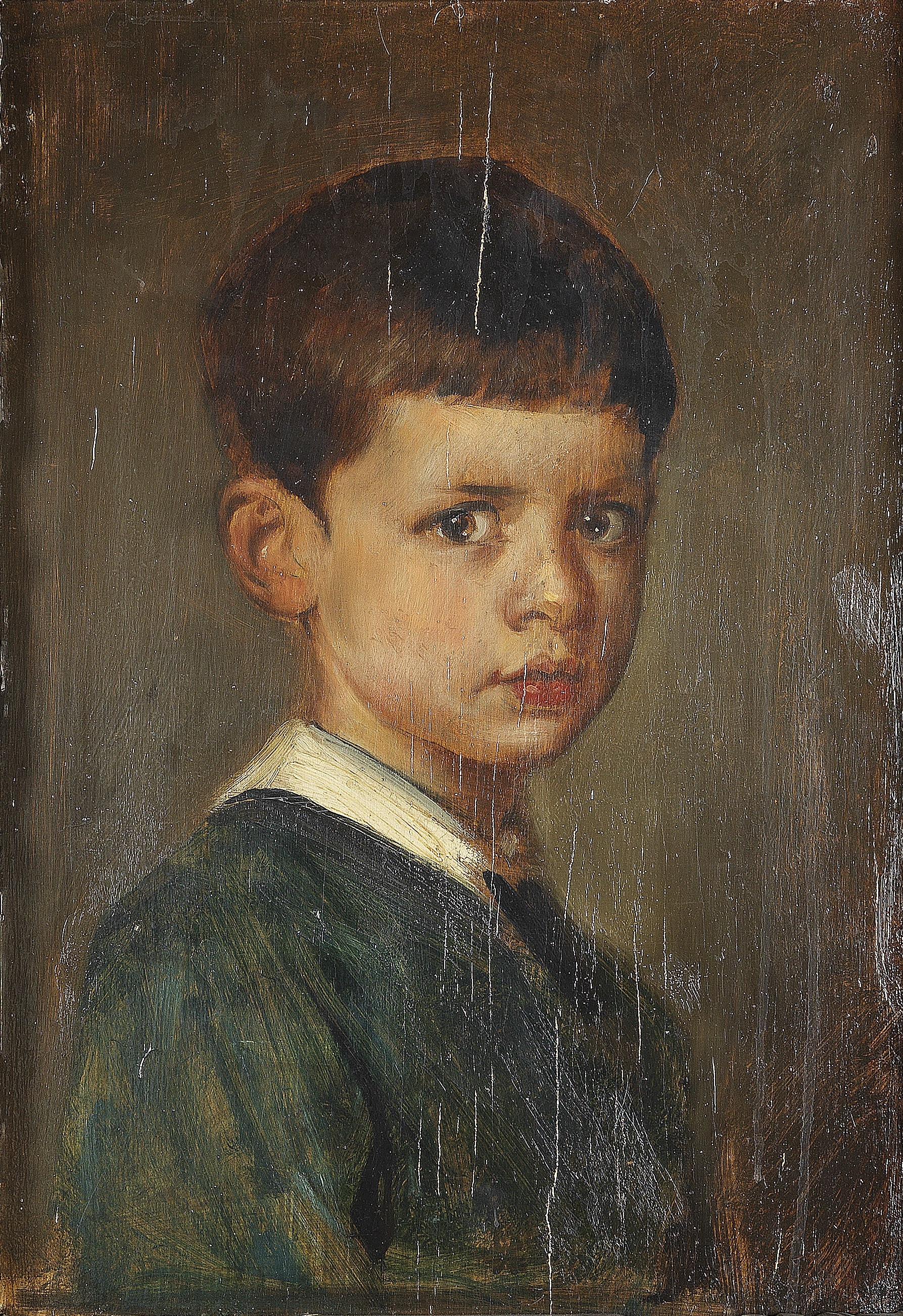
Portrait of Rupprecht as a child by Franz von Lenbach c. 1874

Rupprecht was born in Munich, the eldest of the thirteen children of Prince Ludwig (later King of Bavaria as Ludwig III) and of Archduchess Maria Theresa of Austria-Este, a niece of Duke Francis V of Modena. He was a member of the lineage of both Louis XIV of France and William the Conqueror. As a direct descendant of Henrietta of England, daughter of Charles I of England, he was claimant to the thrones of England, Scotland and Ireland in the Jacobite succession. His early education from the age of seven was conducted by Freiherr Rolf Kreusser, an Anglo-Bavarian. In his youth, he spent much of his time at Schloss Leutstetten, Starnberg, and at the family's villa near Lindau, Lake Constance, where he was able to develop a keen interest in sports. His education was traditional and conservative, but he became the first member of the royal house of Bavaria to spend time at a public school, when he was educated at the Maximilian-Gymnasium in Munich, where he spent four years. Apart from his academic studies and his training in riding and dancing, at school he was also obliged to learn a trade, and he chose carpentry.

== Pre-war ==
Rupprecht's paternal grandfather, Luitpold, became regent of Bavaria when King Ludwig II and his successor Otto were declared insane in 1886. Rupprecht's own position changed somewhat through these events as it became clear that he was likely to succeed to the Bavarian throne one day.

After graduating from high school, he entered the Bavarian Army's Infanterie-Leibregiment as a second lieutenant. He interrupted his military career to study at the universities of Munich and Berlin from 1889 to 1891. He rose to the rank of a colonel and became the commanding officer of the 2nd Infanterie Regiment Kronprinz but found enough opportunity to travel extensively to the Middle East, India, Japan and China. His early journeys were made with his adjutant, Otto von Stetten. Later he was accompanied by his first wife.

At the age of 31, Rupprecht married his kinswoman Duchess Marie Gabrielle in Bavaria, with whom he had five children before her early death in 1912 at the age of 34.

In 1900, he became the 1,128th Knight of the Order of the Golden Fleece in Austria.

In 1906, Rupprecht was made commander of the Bavarian I Army Corps, with the rank of lieutenant general of the infantry, promoted to full general in 1913.

In 1910 he arranged "Meisterwerke muhammedanischer Kunst" in Munich - the largest exhibition of Islamic art.

In 1912, Rupprecht's father Ludwig succeeded as Prince Regent. On 5 November 1913, Ludwig was made king by vote of the Bavarian Senate, becoming Ludwig III. This decision made Rupprecht the Crown Prince of Bavaria.

Rupprecht and Crown Prince Wilhelm of Prussia each commanded an army on the western front (the Sixth Army and the Fifth Army, respectively) and were directly involved in the implementation of the Schlieffen Plan.

== First World War ==
After the outbreak of World War I in July 1914, Rupprecht took command (2 August 1914) of the German Sixth Army in Lorraine. While much of the German army participated in the Schlieffen plan, the Crown Prince led his troops in the Battle of Lorraine (14 to 25 August 1914). His appointment to command the Sixth Army came as a result of his royal position, but the level of study he had performed before he took command was a factor behind his successful direction of the Sixth Army, and he proved a highly able commander. Rupprecht's army gave way to the French attack in August 1914, in the Battle of Lorraine, and then launched a counteroffensive on 20 August. Rupprecht failed to break through the French lines. In fact he was ordered by German General Staff to only occupy the French forces in that region. It was his idea to attack more aggressively. He later commanded the 6th Army in Northern France (until August 1916), and remained on the Western Front during the stalemate that would last until the end of the war. Only a few days after the battle, his oldest son, Luitpold, died of polio in Munich (27 August 1914).

During the spring of 1915, Rupprecht sent an answer to General Moritz von Bissing, the Governor-General of Belgium, responding to Bissing's inquiry about Bavaria's opinion on the "Belgian question". Rupprecht envisaged an economic and military association of Belgium with Germany by introducing the Netherlands (enlarged by the Flemish areas of Belgium and northern France) and Luxembourg (enlarged by Belgian Luxembourg) as new federal states of the German Empire. To the Kingdom of Prussia, Rupprecht suggested other areas of northern France, Walloon Belgium with Liege and Namur, and the salient of the Netherlands round Maastricht. The Imperial Territory of Alsace-Lorraine and the rest of Lorraine was to be partitioned between Bavaria and Prussia. Rupprecht aimed to reduce Prussia's hegemonic role in the Reich by building a sort of an imperial triumvirate of power between Prussia, Bavaria and the Netherlands. Likewise when Moltke the Younger ordered Bavarian troops to defend Prussia from the East, he declined. As a result, troops had to be withdrawn from the Belgian front – a more difficult undertaking.

In November 1915 Hermann von Kuhl became Rupprecht's new Chief of Staff. This work relationship would last for the remainder of the war.

Rupprecht achieved the rank of field marshal (Generalfeldmarschall) in July 1916 and on 28 August that year assumed command of Army Group Rupprecht, consisting of the 1st, 2nd, 6th and 7th armies. Rupprecht has been considered by some one of the best royal commanders in the Imperial German Army of World War I, possibly even the only one to deserve his command. Rupprecht came to the conclusion – much earlier than most other German generals (towards the end of 1917) – that the war could not be won, given the ever-increasing material advantage of the Allies. He also opposed the "scorched-earth" policy during withdrawals, but his royal position made a resignation on those grounds impossible for him, even though he threatened it. He eventually resigned from his command on 11 November 1918 – the day of the armistice.

He became engaged to the much younger Princess Antonia of Luxembourg in 1918, but Germany's capitulation delayed their marriage, and the engagement was postponed again.

=== Links to military aviation ===
Max Immelmann, one of the most famous German First World War flying aces, referred in a letter written on 25 June 1915 to a visit by Rupprecht to an airfield to inspect the new Fokker Eindecker aircraft.

Primarily to see these fighting machines, yesterday the Crown Prince of Bavaria visited the field and inspected us and Abteilung 20. Director Fokker, the constructor of the combat aircraft, was presented to him.

== Interwar years ==
Prince Rupprecht and his second wife, Princess Antonia of Luxembourg

On 12 November 1918, in the wake of civil unrest in the last days of the war, Rupprecht's father, Ludwig III, promulgated the Anif declaration releasing his officials, officers and soldiers from their oaths. Although he did not formally abdicate (and some loyalists would continue to refer to Ludwig as king), the declaration was interpreted by the government of Bavaria as an abdication, making Bavaria a republic and ending 738 years of Wittelsbach rule; Rupprecht thus lost his chance to rule Bavaria. Rupprecht escaped to Tyrol in fear of reprisals from the brief communist regime in Bavaria under Kurt Eisner but returned in September 1919. While away from Bavaria, he succeeded his mother, Maria Theresa of Austria-Este, the last Queen of Bavaria, as the Jacobite heir. This occurred upon her death on 3 February 1919. As such, under his anglicized name, he would be King Robert I of England and King Robert IV of Scotland, although he never claimed these crowns and "strongly discouraged" anyone from claiming them on his behalf.

The changed political situation however allowed him finally to marry Princess Antonia of Luxembourg on 7 April 1921. The nuncio to Bavaria, Eugenio Pacelli, later Pope Pius XII, officiated at the ceremony.

Shortly after the 1922 Washington Naval Conference, he made a statement regarding the possible ban of aerial bombing, poison gas, sea blockades and long range guns, blaming them for a majority of civilian casualties during the last war. He also advocated Germany's participation in future peace conferences, and he dismissed claims that Kaiser Wilhelm II was to blame for the First World War.

While opposed to the Weimar Republic and never having renounced his rights to the throne, Rupprecht envisaged a constitutional monarchy for Bavaria. Upon his father's death in October 1921, Rupprecht declared his claim to the throne, since his father had never formally renounced his crown in the Anif declaration. While never crowned king, he did become the head of the House of Wittelsbach after his father's death. He formed the Wittelsbacher Ausgleichfond in 1923, which was an agreement with the state of Bavaria, leaving the most important of the Wittelsbach palaces, like Neuschwanstein and Linderhof, to the Bavarian people. Afterwards, Rupprecht became critical of wars like World War I. Rupprecht once said to The New York Times that the Washington Naval Conference would be able to make future warfare more humane. Rupprecht added that future conferences would entirely abolish chemical warfare.

Rupprecht was never enticed to join the Nazis in Germany, despite Hitler's attempts to win him over through Ernst Röhm and promises of royal restoration. The anti-Catholic stance of men like Erich Ludendorff might have been an influence. He helped persuade Gustav von Kahr not to support Hitler during the Beer Hall Putsch. Hitler confided in private to a personal dislike of the Crown Prince. The Crown Prince in turn confessed to King George V at a lunch in London in the summer of 1934 that he considered Hitler to be insane. With the worsening of the Great Depression in 1932, a plan was floated to give Rupprecht dictatorial powers in Bavaria under the title of Staatskommissar. The plan attracted support from a wide coalition of parties, including the SPD and the post-war Bavarian Minister-President (First Minister) Wilhelm Hoegner but the legal appointment of Hitler as Reichskanzler in 1933 by Hindenburg and the hesitant Bavarian government under Heinrich Held ended all hopes for the idea.

Rupprecht continued to believe that restoration of the monarchy was possible, an opinion he voiced to the British ambassador Eric Phipps in 1935.

== Second World War ==
Rupprecht was forced into exile in Italy in December 1939 (the last straw being the confiscation of Schloß Leutstetten by the Nazis) where he stayed as a guest of King Victor Emmanuel III, residing mostly in Florence. He and his family were barred from returning to Germany. He continued to harbor the idea of the restoration of the Bavarian monarchy, in a possible union with Austria as an independent Southern Germany. In a memorandum in May 1943, he voiced his opinion that Germany would be completely defeated in the war and hoped to spare the German people from the worst when the Nazi regime finally fell. He even mentioned his ambition for the German crown, which had been held by the House of Wittelsbach in the past.

In October 1944, when Germany occupied Hungary, Rupprecht's wife and children were captured, while he, still in Italy, evaded arrest. They were first imprisoned in the Sachsenhausen concentration camp at Oranienburg, Brandenburg. In April 1945, they were moved to the Dachau concentration camp, where they were liberated by the United States Army. Antonia never recovered completely from the captivity, and died in 1954 in Switzerland, having vowed never to return to Germany after her ordeal. She was buried in Rome but her heart was, complying with Wittelsbach tradition, enshrined in the Gnadenkapelle (Chapel of the Miraculous Image) at Altötting.

== Post-war ==
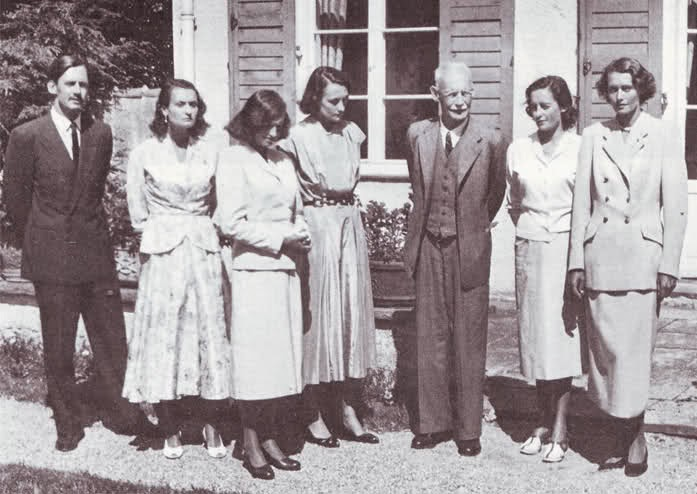
Rupprecht with six of his children

Rupprecht continued to advocate the restoration of the Bavarian monarchy upon his return but found no support from the US occupation authorities who, however, treated him courteously. General Dwight D. Eisenhower provided a special plane to fly him back to Munich in September 1945 and he returned to Schloß Leutstetten.

Of the 170 members of the Bavarian parliament, 70 declared themselves to be monarchists in September 1954, a clear sign of support for the Crown Prince.

== Death ==
Upon his death in 1955 at Schloss Leutstetten at the age of 86, he was treated like a deceased monarch, receiving a state funeral. His life had spanned the independent Kingdom of Bavaria, the German Empire, the Weimar Republic, Nazi Germany, Allied-occupied Germany, and the establishment of West Germany and East Germany. He is buried in the crypt of the Theatinerkirche in Munich near his grandfather Prince Luitpold and great-great-grandfather King Maximilian I, between his first wife Duchess Maria Gabrielle and his eldest son Prince Luitpold.

== Marriages and children ==
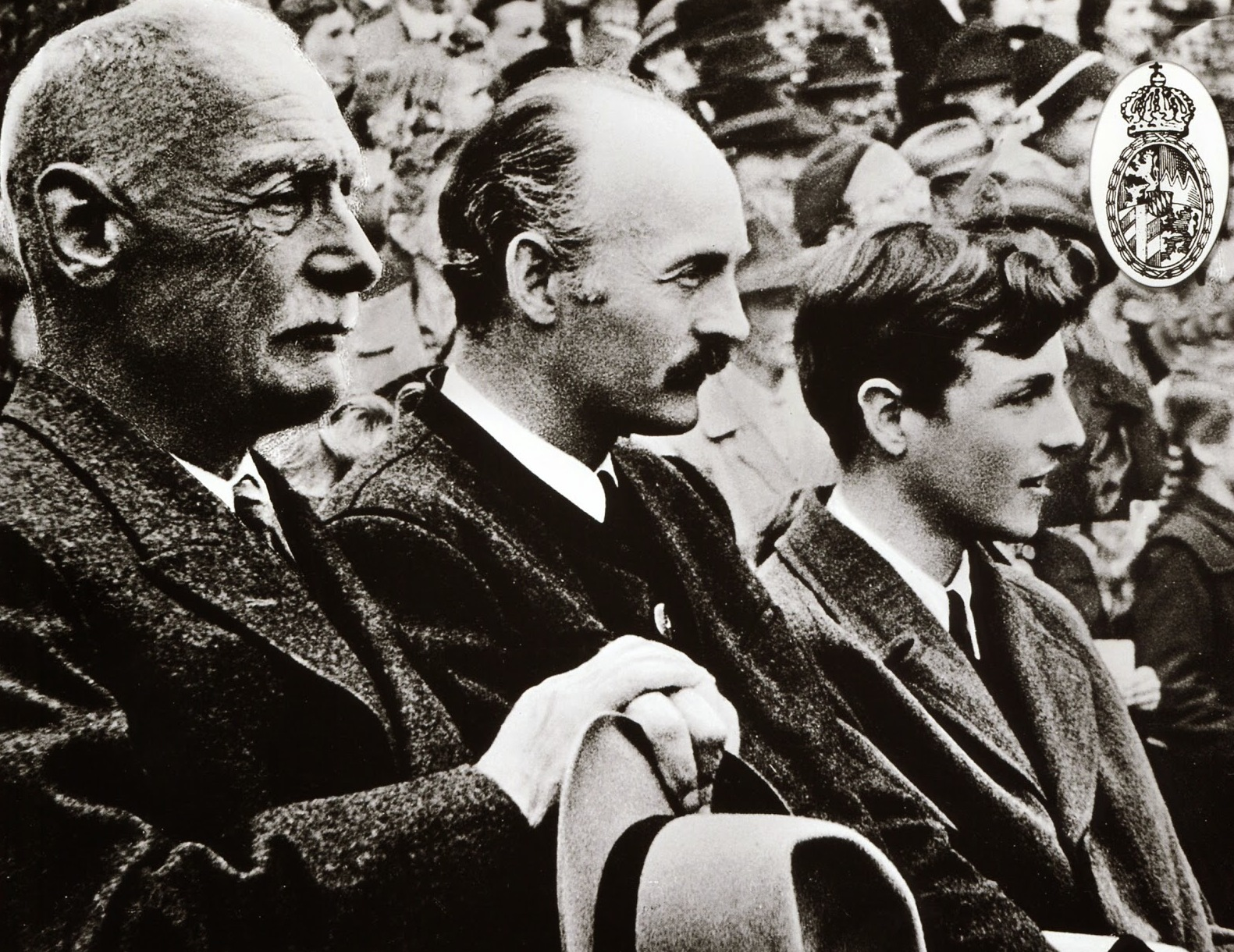
Crown Prince Rupprecht (left) with his son Albrecht and his grandson Franz in 1948

Rupprecht married twice and had children with both of his wives. His first wife was Duchess Marie Gabriele in Bavaria (9 October 1878 – 24 October 1912), daughter of Duke Karl-Theodor in Bavaria, married on 10 July 1900 in Munich. They had five children:

- Luitpold Maximilian Ludwig Karl, Hereditary Prince of Bavaria (8 May 1901 – 27 August 1914); died of polio.
- Princess Irmingard Maria Therese José Cäcilia Adelheid Michaela Antonia Adelgunde of Bavaria (21 September 1902 – 21 April 1903); died of diphtheria.
- Albrecht, Duke of Bavaria (3 May 1905 – 8 July 1996).
- Stillborn daughter (6 December 1906).
- Prince Rudolf Friedrich Rupprecht of Bavaria (30 May 1909 – 26 June 1912); died of diabetes.

His second wife was Princess Antonia of Luxembourg (7 October 1899 – 31 July 1954), daughter of William IV, Grand Duke of Luxembourg, married on 7 April 1921 in Lenggries. They had six children:

- Prince Heinrich Franz Wilhelm of Bavaria (28 March 1922 – 14 February 1958). Married non-dynastically Anne Marie de Lustrac (1927–1999). No issue. Heinrich was killed in a car accident in Argentina. His wife Anne was killed in a similar accident in Milan forty years later.
- Princess Irmingard Marie Josefa of Bavaria (29 May 1923 – 23 October 2010). Married her first cousin Prince Ludwig of Bavaria (1913–2008) and had issue.
- Princess Editha Marie Gabriele Anna of Bavaria (16 September 1924 – 4 May 2013). Married first Tito Tommaso Maria Brunetti (1905–1954) and second Prof. Gustav Christian Schimert (1910–1990). Had issue by both.
- Princess Hilda Hildegard Marie Gabriele of Bavaria (24 March 1926 – 5 May 2002). Married Juan Bradstock Edgar Lockett de Loayza (1912–1987) and had issue.
- Princess Gabriele Adelgunde Marie Theresia Antonia of Bavaria (10 May 1927 – 19 April 2019). Married Carl, 14th Duke of Croÿ (1914–2011), and had issue.
- Princess Sophie Marie Therese of Bavaria (b. 20 June 1935). Married Prince Jean-Engelbert, 12th Duke of Arenberg (1921–2011), and has issue.

== Honours ==
Royal monogram

German honours

- Bavaria:
  - Knight of St. Hubert
  - Grand Prior of the Upper Palatinate of the Royal Bavarian House Equestrian Order of St. George, 1889
  - Grand Cross of the Military Order of Max Joseph, 23 August 1914
  - Grand Cross of the Military Merit Order, with Swords
- (Duchy of Anhalt) Anhalt:
  - Grand Cross of the Order of Albert the Bear, with Swords
  - Friedrich Cross
- Baden:
  - Knight of the House Order of Fidelity, 1887
  - Knight of the Order of Berthold the First, 1887
  - Grand Cross of the Military Karl-Friedrich Merit Order
- Brunswick:
  - Grand Cross of the Order of Henry the Lion
  - War Merit Cross, 2nd Class
- (Saxe-Coburg and Gotha) (Duchy of Saxe-Altenburg) (Saxe-Meiningen) Ernestine duchies:
  - Grand Cross of the Saxe-Ernestine House Order, with Swords
  - Cross for Merit in War (Meiningen)
- (Bremen (state)) (Hamburg) Free Hanseatic Cities: Hanseatic Crosses
- (Grand Duchy of Hesse) Hesse and by Rhine:
  - Grand Cross of the Ludwig Order, 22 March 1893
  - General Honor Decoration
- Prussia:
  - Knight of the Black Eagle, 22 June 1890
  - Iron Cross (1914), 1st and 2nd Classes
  - Pour le Mérite (military), 22 August 1915; with Oak Leaves, 20 December 1916
- Hohenzollern: Cross of Honour of the Princely House Order of Hohenzollern, 1st Class
- Lippe-Detmold:
  - War Honor Cross for Heroic Deeds
  - War Merit Cross
  - Cross of Honour of the House Order of Lippe, 1st Class with Swords
- Mecklenburg:
  - Grand Cross of the Wendish Crown, with Crown in Ore
  - Military Merit Cross, 1st Class (Schwerin)
- Oldenburg: Grand Cross of the Order of Duke Peter Friedrich Ludwig, with Golden Crown
- Saxony:
  - Knight of the Rue Crown
  - Knight of the Military Order of St. Henry, August 1914; Commander 2nd Class, June 1915; Commander 1st Class, January 1917; Grand Cross, May 1918
- Württemberg:
  - Grand Cross of the Württemberg Crown
  - Grand Cross of the Military Merit Order

Foreign honours

- (Austrian Empire) (Kingdom of Hungary) Austro-Hungarian Imperial and Royal Family:
  - Grand Cross of the Royal Hungarian Order of St. Stephen, 1893
  - Knight of the Golden Fleece, 1900
  - Military Merit Cross, 1st Class with War Decoration
  - Military Merit Medal (Signum Laudis)
- Belgium: Grand Cordon of the Order of Leopold, 1897
- China: Order of the Double Dragon, First Class, Second Grade (ChDDI2)
- (Kingdom of Italy) Italian Royal Family:
  - Grand Cross of the Crown of Italy, ca. 1914
  - Knight of the Annunciation, 1948
  - Grand Cross of Saints Maurice and Lazarus, 1948
- Japan: Grand Cordon of the Order of the Chrysanthemum, 16 May 1905
- Luxembourg: Knight of the Gold Lion of Nassau
- Ottoman Empire:
  - Order of Osmanieh, 1st Class in Diamonds
  - Turkish War Medal ("Gallipoli Star")
  - Gold Imtiaz Medal with Swords
- Romania: Grand Cross of the Star of Romania
- Spain: Grand Cross of the Order of Charles III, with Collar, 8 November 1908
- Sweden: Knight of the Seraphim, 18 September 1897
- (Tuscany) Tuscan Grand Ducal Family: Grand Cross of St. Joseph
- (Kingdom of the Two Sicilies) Two Sicilian Royal Family: Grand Cross of St. Ferdinand and Merit
- United Kingdom: Honorary Grand Cross of the Royal Victorian Order

=== Military ranks ===
- Sekondlieutenant: 8 August 1886
- Premierlieutenant: 1 November 1891
- Rittmeister: 17 May 1893
- Major: 4 June 1896
- Oberstleutenant: ??
- Oberst: 28 October 1899
- Generalmajor: 7 October 1900
- Generalleutnant: 11 November 1903
- General der Infanterie: 19 April 1906
- Generaloberst: 4 February 1913
- Generalfeldmarschall: 25 July 1916

== Ancestry ==
Ancestors of Rupprecht, Crown Prince of Bavaria

8. Ludwig I of Bavaria
4. Luitpold, Prince Regent of Bavaria
9. Princess Therese of Saxe-Hildburghausen
2. Ludwig III of Bavaria
10. Leopold II, Grand Duke of Tuscany
5. Archduchess Auguste Ferdinande of Austria
11. Princess Maria Anna of Saxony
1. Rupprecht, Crown Prince of Bavaria
12. Francis IV, Duke of Modena
6. Archduke Ferdinand Karl Viktor of Austria-Este
13. Princess Maria Beatrice of Savoy
3. Archduchess Maria Theresa of Austria-Este
14. Archduke Joseph, Palatine of Hungary
7. Archduchess Elisabeth Franziska of Austria
15. Duchess Maria Dorothea of Württemberg

== Works ==
- Mein Kriegstagebuch [My War Diary] (in German). München: Deutscher National Verlag, 1929.
- Reiseerinnerungen aus Indien. München: Josef Kösel & Friedrich Pustet, 1922.
- Reiseerinnerungen aus Ostasien. München: Josef Kösel & Friedrich Pustet, 1923.
- Reiseerinnerungen aus dem Südosten Europas und dem Orient. München: Josef Kösel & Friedrich Pustet, 1923.

Rupprecht, Crown Prince of Bavaria House of Wittelsbach Born: 18 May 1869 Died: 2 August 1955
Titles in pretence
Preceded by Ludwig III, King of Bavaria	— TITULAR — King of Bavaria; 18 October 1921 – 2 August 1955; Reason for succession failure: Kingdom abolished in 1918	Succeeded by Albrecht, Duke of Bavaria
Preceded by Archduchess Maria Theresa of Austria-Este	— TITULAR — King of England, Scotland and Ireland; 3 February 1919 – 2 August 1955; Reason for succession failure: Act of Settlement 1701	Succeeded by Albrecht, Duke of Bavaria
Military offices
Preceded by Formed from IV Army Inspectorate (IV. Armee-Inspektion)	Commander, 6th Army; 2 August 1914 – 28 August 1916	Succeeded by Generaloberst Ludwig von Falkenhausen
Preceded by Formed from Army Group Gallwitz	Commander, Army Group Rupprecht of Bavaria; 28 August 1916 – 11 November 1918	Dissolved
