= Princess Hilda of Luxembourg =

Princess of Schwarzenberg (1897–1979)

Princess Hilda
- Princess consort of Schwarzenberg
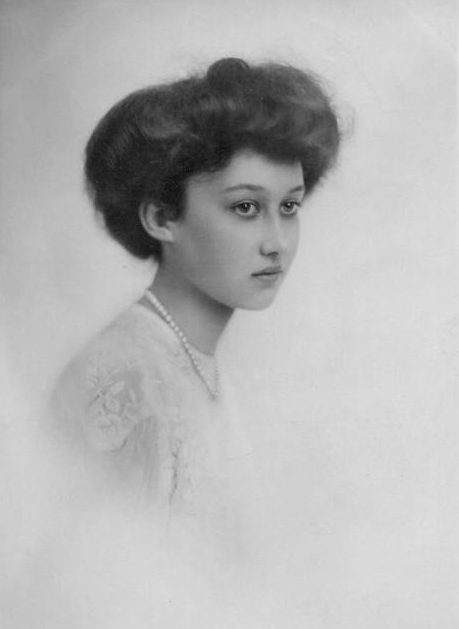
- Princess Hilda in 1915
- Born: 15 February 1897; Berg Castle, Colmar-Berg, Luxembourg
- Died: 8 September 1979 (aged 82); Berg Castle, Colmar-Berg, Luxembourg
- Spouse: Prince Adolf, 10th Prince of Schwarzenberg (m. 1930; died 1950)
Names
- French: Hilda Sophie Marie Adélaïde Wilhelmine
- House: Nassau-Weilburg
- Father: William IV, Grand Duke of Luxembourg
- Mother: Infanta Marie Anne of Portugal

Princess Hilda of Luxembourg (French: Hilda Sophie Marie Adélaïde Wilhelmine de Nassau-Weilburg, Princesse de Luxembourg; 15 February 1897 – 8 September 1979) was a Princess of Luxembourg by birth and Princess of Schwarzenberg by marriage.

== Early life ==
Princess Hilda Sophie Marie Adélaïde Wilhelmine of Luxembourg was born on 15 February 1897 at Berg Castle, Colmar-Berg. She was the third daughter of William IV, Grand Duke of Luxembourg, and his wife, Infanta Marie Anne of Portugal.

She grew up in the Grand Ducal family alongside her five sisters. Her two eldest sisters, Marie-Adélaïde and Charlotte, later reigned as sovereign Grand Duchesses of Luxembourg and were also titular Duchesses of Nassau.

== Marriage ==
Princess Hilda married Adolf, 10th Prince of Schwarzenberg (18 August 1890 – 27 February 1950) on 29 October 1930 at Berg Castle in Luxembourg.

The couple shared a strong interest in agriculture, wildlife, and botany, and spent much of their time at their Stará Obora hunting lodge near Hluboká in Bohemia.

In 1933, they acquired Mpala Farm in Laikipia, Kenya, where Prince Adolf introduced modern agricultural methods. He also oversaw the construction of a hydroelectric power station—using machinery partly imported from Hluboká—and implemented significant improvements to the living conditions of estate workers.

Following his father’s death in 1938, Adolf inherited the Schwarzenberg family estates. The marriage remained childless.

== Titles ==
- 15 February 1897 – 29 October 1930: Her Grand Ducal Highness Princess Hilda of Luxembourg, Princess of Nassau
- 29 October 1930 – 1 October 1938: Her Grand Ducal Highness The Hereditary Princess of Schwarzenberg, Princess of Luxembourg and Nassau
- 1 October 1938 – 27 February 1950: Her Grand Ducal Highness The Princess of Schwarzenberg, Princess of Luxembourg and Nassau
- 27 February 1950 – 8 September 1979: Her Grand Ducal Highness The Dowager Princess of Schwarzenberg, Princess of Luxembourg and Nassau

== Bibliography ==
- Généalogie des rois et des princes de Jean-Charles Volkmann Edit. Jean-Paul Giserot (1998)

Princess Hilda of Luxembourg House of Nassau-Weilburg Cadet branch of the House of Nassau Born: 15 February 1897 Died: 8 September 1979
Regnal titles
Preceded by Charlotte	Heir to the crown of Luxembourg; 1919–1921	Succeeded by Jean
