= Meisterwerke muhammedanischer Kunst =

1910 art exhibition in Germany of Islamic art

The exhibition Meisterwerke muhammedanischer Kunst (Masterpieces of Muhammadan Art) took place at Theresienhöhe, Munich, Germany, starting on 14 May 1910 thanks to art collector Bavarian crown prince Rupprecht.

With around 3,600 objects from more than 260 international collections in 80 pavilions, it was the largest exhibition of Islamic art before World War I. It aimed at a comprehensive historical overview of the arts in Muslim countries and thus prepared the ground for further scientific research in this field. Objects that had previously been considered as folk art or arts and crafts were elevated to the status of "masterpieces".

According to modern scholars it was the turning point: it broke away from the previously dominant idea of orientalism and exotic fantasies and led to a fact-based view of the visual culture of the Muslim world. Calling these items masterpieces, it aimed to award Islamic art "a place equal to that of other cultural periods".

== Bibliography ==
- Andrea Lermer and Avinoam Shalem (eds.) After One Hundred Years. The 1910 Exhibition "Meisterwerke muhammedanischer Kunst" Reconsidered. 2010. ISBN 978-90-04-19001-6
- Eva-Maria Troelenberg. Regarding the exhibition: the Munich exhibition Masterpieces of Muhammadan Art (1910) and its scholarly position. In: Journal of Art Historiography 6, June 2012, pp. 1–35
- Emily Christensen. Wassily Kandinsky at the Exhibition "Meisterwerke muhammedanischer Kunst" in Munich, 1910. A Modernist Artist's Interpretation of Persian Art. In Manazir Journal, vol. 3, pp. 165–173, 2021
