= Schloss Hohenburg =

Building in Upper Bavaria, Germany

Coordinates: 47°40′20.0″N 11°35′14.0″E

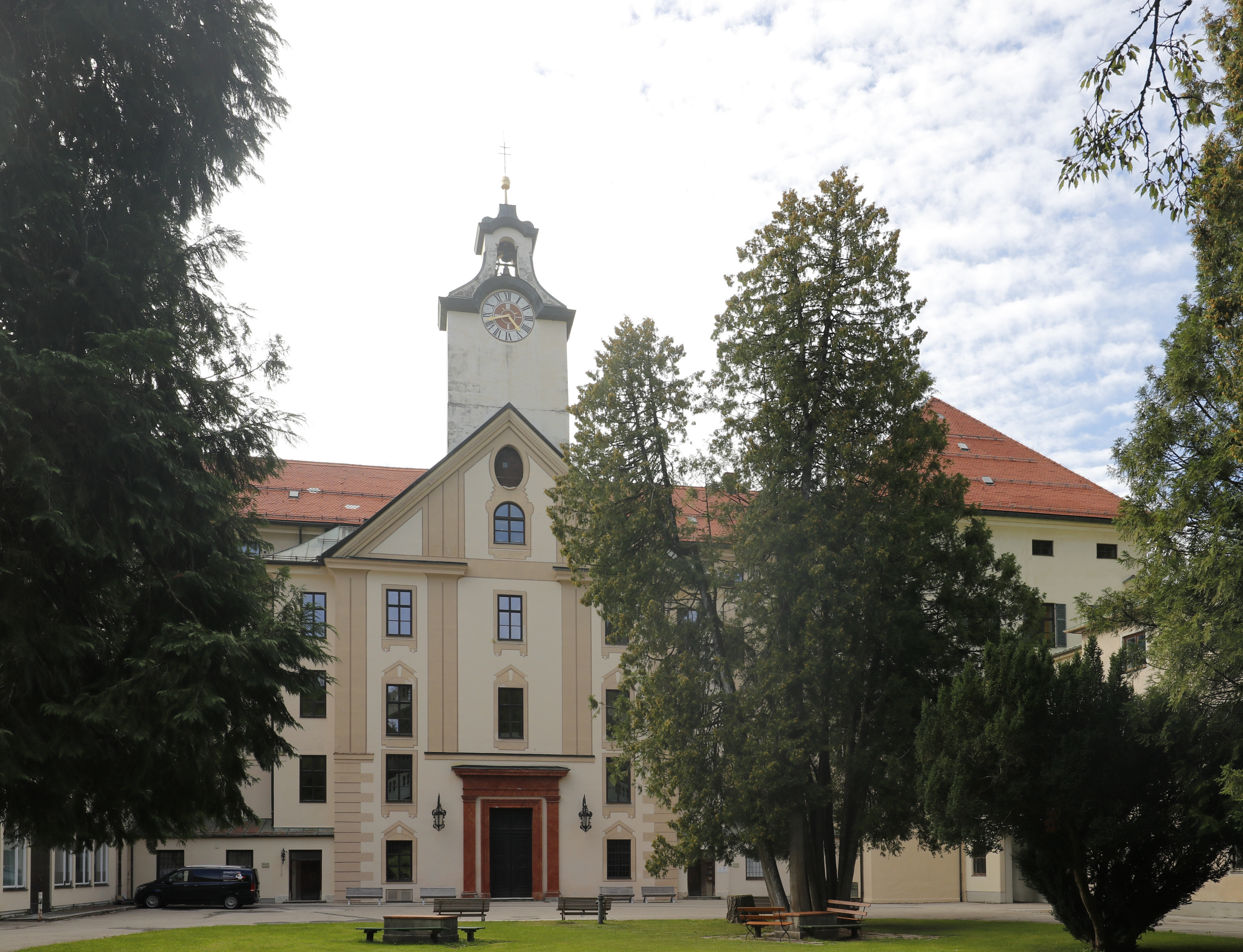
East entrance and clock tower, Schloss Hohenburg

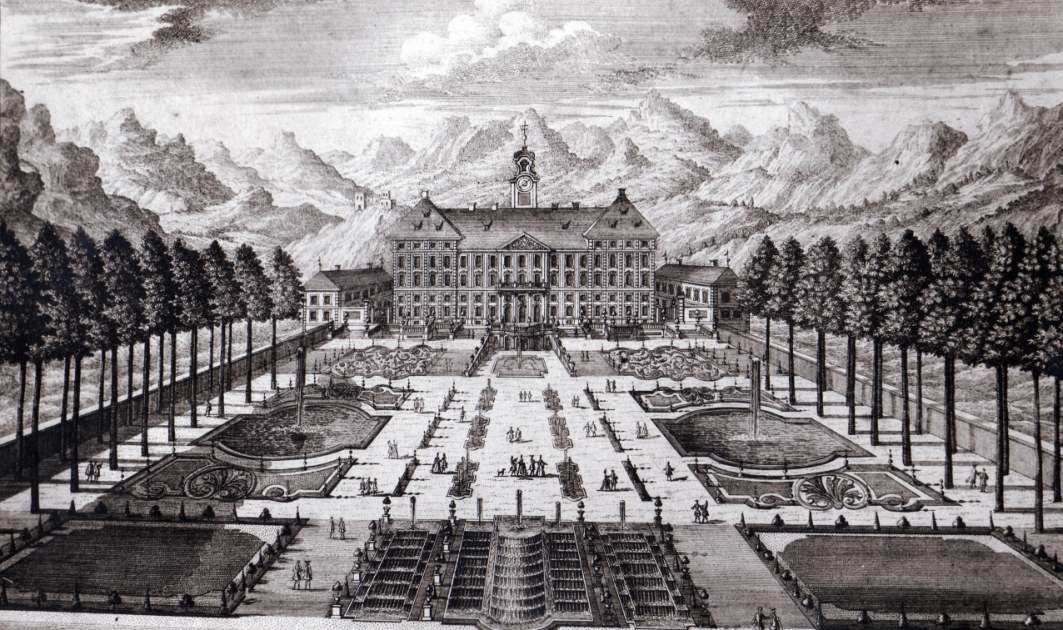
Schloss Hohenburg and formal gardens c. 1720, engraving by Michael Wening; the ruined Hohenburg is visible in the background to the left of the palace.

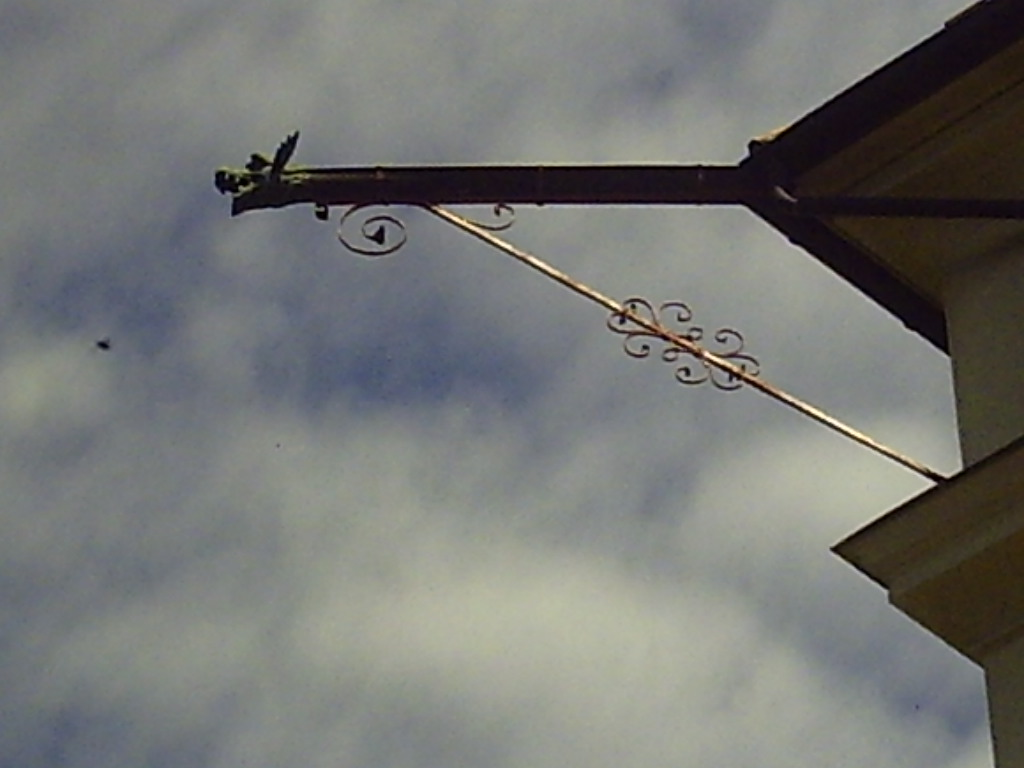
Dragon waterspout

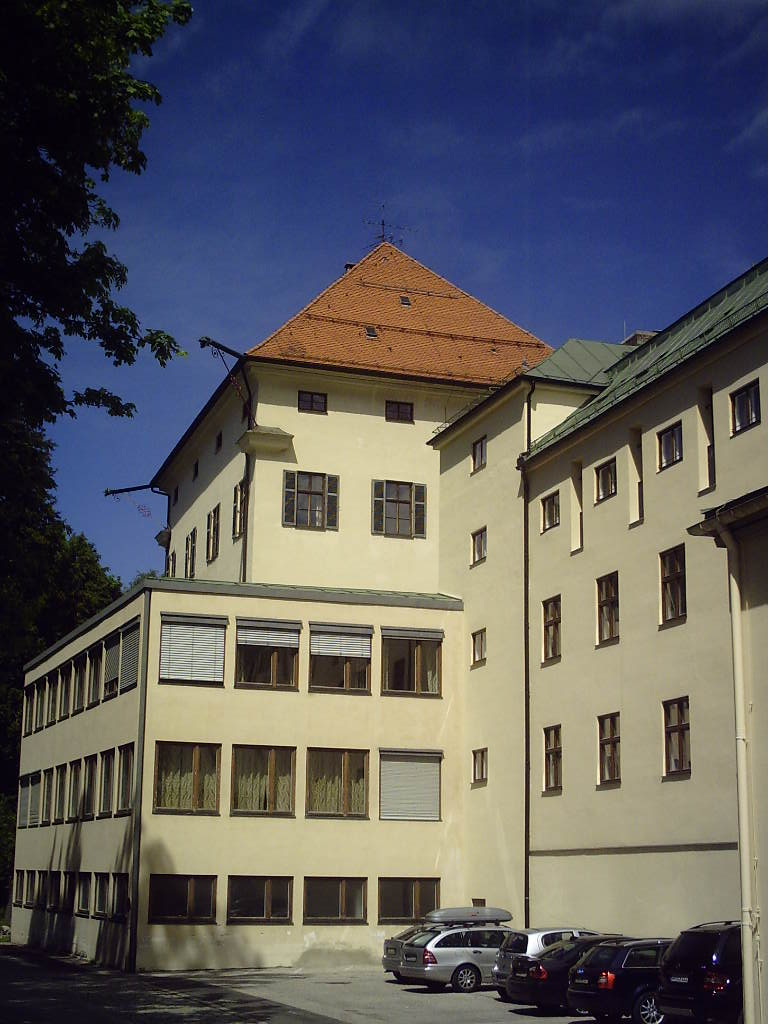
Classroom extension on south side

Schloss Hohenburg is a Baroque schloss (palace) in Lenggries, Bavaria, Germany.

== History ==
=== Construction by the Herwarth family ===
Count Ferdinand Joseph von Herwarth had the palace built in classical Baroque style in 1712–18 to replace the medieval Hohenburg, which had been destroyed by fire in 1707 while occupied by Austrian troops during the War of the Spanish Succession. It is located approximately 300 metres (330 yd) west, at the foot of the hill on which the old castle was built; stones from the ruin were used in the construction, and also to build the Lenggries parish church, St. James (German: St. Jakob), which was completed in 1722 and in which he is buried.

The main building of the palace has three storeys and a hip roof with waterspouts in the shape of dragons; the central portion has a mezzanine and the corner bays an additional half storey. There were originally three wings forming a large enclosed courtyard on the east side, of which two remain. A solid clock tower rises above the central bay facing this courtyard. The interior is sumptuously decorated with frescos, paintings, statues, ornamented pillars and chandeliers. The chapel was finished in 1722. Formal gardens in the style of Versailles were laid out by Matthias Diesel.

=== Ownership by the Prince of Leiningen ===
In the early 19th century the Herwarth line died out. Schloss Hohenburg changed hands a number of times, belonging to the Zech family in 1807, the Kramer family in 1817 and the Taufkirchen family in 1833. In 1836 it and the accompanying large feudal estate were bought by Prince Carl of Leiningen (1804 – 1856), half-brother to Queen Victoria through his mother, Princess Victoria of Saxe-Coburg-Saalfeld, who remarried to Prince Edward, Duke of Kent and Strathearn after the death of her first husband, Prince Emich Carl of Leiningen. He had changes made to the exterior of the palace, redecorated several rooms, and converted the Baroque garden to a park in the English style. He was also an enthusiastic huntsman and developed an extensive hunting preserve at Lenggries. He built the Gothic Waldleiningen Castle in the Odenwald at the same time.

=== Ownership by Baron von Eichthal ===
In 1857, after Prince Carl's death, the palace and estate were bought for only 32,000 guilders by Baron Carl von Eichthal, son of Baron Simon von Eichthal (born Seligmann), a banker who had financed art purchases by the future King Ludwig I of Bavaria and Bavarian loans to Greece and co-founded the Bayerische Hypotheken- und Wechselbank and several Bavarian railway companies. Carl von Eichthal bought the secularised Abbey of St. Blaise in the Black Forest and manufactured munitions and cotton there. In 1887 the estate belonging to Schloss Hohenburg encompassed 3,295 hectares (8,140 acres) and included an inn and other businesses in Lenggries, 150 farm animals, chiefly dairy cattle, cheese manufacturing and a brewery.

=== Ownership by the Duke of Nassau and Grand Duke of Luxembourg ===
The palace and its large hunting preserve were bought in February 1870 by Adolphe of Nassau-Weilburg, who had lost his throne as Duke of Nassau to the Prussians in 1866 and had since been wandering between relatives' residences and looking for a hunting preserve. On 9 December 1890 he was sworn in as Grand Duke of Luxembourg and Schloss Hohenburg became his summer residence. He died there in 1905, and his son, William IV, spent increasing amounts of time there as his illness worsened. Following her service as regent before their daughter Marie-Adélaïde came of age, the palace then became the residence of his widow, Marie Anne of Portugal, until she and the remainder of the grand ducal family left for exile in the United States on 24 September 1939 following the outbreak of World War II. After the war the US General George S. Patton returned the property to the Grand Duchess Charlotte and the Grand Duchy.

=== Catholic girls' schools ===
In 1953 the Fürth industrialist Max Grundig bought the Hohenburg estate, and on 3 October that year donated the palace to the sisters of the Ursuline Convent of St. Joseph in Landshut, who opened a middle school, housekeeping training school and boarding school for girls there. The Catholic Archdiocese of Munich and Freising took over the schools in 1990, and the nuns returned to Landshut in 2003; the property remains the site of two girls' schools, a gymnasium and a realschule. From 2007 to 2011 a specialist secondary school for social careers also operated there.

The estate is now used for raising trout.
