= Princess Adelheid-Marie of Anhalt-Dessau =

Grand Duchess of Luxembourg from 1890 to 1905

Adelheid-Marie of Anhalt-Dessau
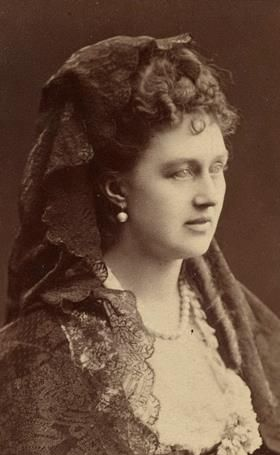
- Adelheid-Marie in the late 1860s

Duchess consort of Nassau
- Tenure: 23 April 1851 – 20 September 1866

Grand Duchess consort of Luxembourg
- Tenure: 23 November 1890 – 17 November 1905
- Born: 25 December 1833; Dessau, Duchy of Anhalt
- Died: 24 November 1916 (aged 82); Königstein im Taunus, German Empire
- Burial: Schlosskirche of Schloss Weilburg
- Spouse: Adolphe, Grand Duke of Luxembourg (m. 1851; died 1905)
- Issue Among others: William IV, Grand Duke of Luxembourg; Hilda, Grand Duchess of Baden
- House: Ascania
- Father: Prince Frederick Augustus of Anhalt-Dessau
- Mother: Princess Marie Luise Charlotte of Hesse-Kassel

Princess Adelheid-Marie of Anhalt-Dessau (German: Adelheid-Marie; French: Adélaïde-Marie) (25 December 1833 – 24 November 1916) was a Princess of Anhalt-Dessau and member of the House of Ascania. As the wife of Adolphe of Nassau, she was Duchess of Nassau from 1851 until 1866 and Grand Duchess of Luxembourg from 1890 until 1905.

== Birth and family ==
Adelheid Marie was born on 25 December 1833, in Dessau, to Prince Frederick Augustus of Anhalt-Dessau and Princess Marie Luise Charlotte of Hesse-Kassel.

== Marriage and issue ==
On 23 April 1851, in Dessau, as his second wife, she was married to Adolphe of Nassau, Duke of Nassau and later Grand Duke of Luxembourg. They had five children, of whom only two lived to the age of 18 and to become prince and princess of Luxembourg:

- William IV (22 April 1852 – 25 February 1912), second Grand Duke of Luxembourg
- Prince Frederick of Nassau (28 September 1854 – 23 October 1855)
- Princess Marie of Nassau (14 November 1857 – 28 December 1857)
- Prince Francis Joseph William of Nassau (30 January 1859 – 2 April 1875)
- Princess Hilda of Nassau (5 November 1864 – 8 February 1952), married Friedrich II, Grand Duke of Baden.

== Grand Duchess consort of Luxembourg ==
Duke Adolph supported the Austrian Empire in the Austro-Prussian War of 1866. After Austria's defeat, Nassau was annexed to the Kingdom of Prussia and Adolph and Marie Adelheid lost their throne on 20 September 1866.

In 1890, King William III of the Netherlands died. His only daughter, Wilhelmina, succeeded on his death without surviving male issue to the Dutch throne, but was excluded from the succession to the Grand Duchy of Luxembourg by the House treaty between the two branches of the House of Nassau. The Grand Duchy, which had been linked to the Netherlands since 1815, passed to the Dutch royal family's distant relative – the dispossessed Duke Adolphe – on 23 November 1890, in accordance with the Nassau Family Pact. Marie Adelheid now became Grand Duchess of Luxembourg.

== Death ==
Marie Adelheid died on 24 November 1916, aged 82, in Königstein im Taunus, German Empire.

== Legacy ==
The Grand Dukes of Luxembourg are still descendants of Adolphe and Marie-Adelheid, although cognatically, since the very independence of the Grand-Duchy required an alteration of the succession laws at the absence of male heirs.

== See also ==
- Prix Grand-Duc Adolphe

Princess Adelheid-Marie of Anhalt-Dessau House of Ascania Born: 25 December 1833 Died: 24 November 1916
Royal titles
Vacant Title last held by Elizabeth Mikhailovna of Russia	Duchess consort of Nassau; 23 April 1851 – 20 September 1866	Duchy annexed by Prussia in 1866
Preceded by Emma of Waldeck and Pyrmont	Grand Duchess consort of Luxembourg; 23 November 1890 – 17 November 1905	Succeeded by Marie Anne of Portugal
