= William IV of Luxembourg =

Grand Duke of Luxembourg from 1905 to 1912

William IV
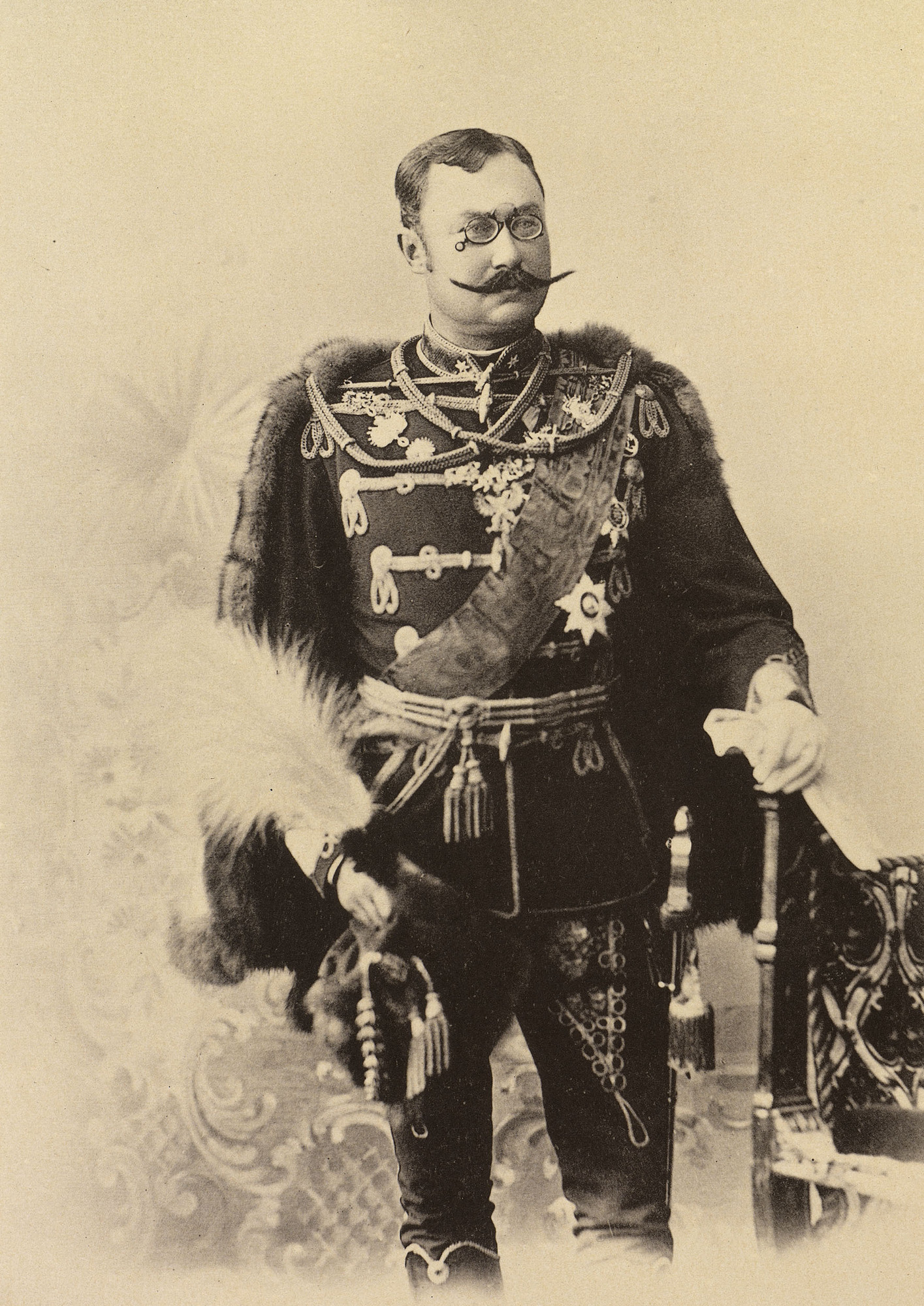
- Formal portrait, 1896

Grand Duke of Luxembourg
- Reign: 17 November 1905 – 25 February 1912
- Predecessor: Adolphe
- Successor: Marie-Adélaïde
- Regent: Marie Anne (1908–1912)
- Born: 22 April 1852; Biebrich Palace, Wiesbaden, Duchy of Nassau
- Died: 25 February 1912 (aged 59); Berg Castle, Colmar-Berg, Luxembourg
- Burial: Schlosskirche ("Castle Church") in Weilburg since 1953
- Spouse: Infanta Marie Anne of Portugal (m. 1893)
- Issue: Marie-Adélaïde, Grand Duchess of Luxembourg; Charlotte, Grand Duchess of Luxembourg; Hilda, Princess of Schwarzenberg; Antonia, Crown Princess of Bavaria; Elisabeth, Princess Ludwig Philipp of Thurn and Taxis; Sophie, Princess Ernst Heinrich of Saxony
- House: Nassau-Weilburg
- Father: Adolphe, Grand Duke of Luxembourg
- Mother: Princess Adelheid-Marie of Anhalt-Dessau
- Religion: Protestantism

William IV (French: Guillaume Alexandre; 22 April 1852 – 25 February 1912) was Grand Duke of Luxembourg from 17 November 1905 until his death in 1912. He succeeded his father, Adolphe. Like his father, William did not participate in politics, despite being vested with considerable power by the Constitution.

William was a Protestant, the religion of the House of Nassau. He married Infanta Marie Anne of Portugal, believing that Luxembourg, a Catholic country, should be headed by a Catholic monarch, thus making his successors Catholic.

At the death of his uncle, Prince Nikolaus-Wilhelm in 1905, the only other legitimate heir to the House of Nassau-Weilburg was William's cousin, Georg Nikolaus, Count of Merenberg, the product of a morganatic marriage. In 1907, William declared the Counts of Merenberg non-dynastic, declaring his eldest daughter Marie-Adélaïde as heiress presumptive to the grand ducal throne. She became grand duchess in her own right upon her father's death in 1912, and upon her own abdication in 1919, was succeeded by his younger daughter Charlotte.

To date, William IV is the last monarch of Luxembourg to die on the throne.

== Marriage ==
On 21 June 1893 in Fischhorn Castle, Zell am See, he married Infanta Marie Anne of Portugal, daughter of former King Miguel I of Portugal and Princess Adelaide of Löwenstein-Wertheim-Rosenberg. The couple had six daughters:

- Marie-Adélaïde, Grand Duchess of Luxembourg (1894–1924) who remained unmarried and childless
- Charlotte, Grand Duchess of Luxembourg (1896–1985) who married her first cousin Prince Felix of Bourbon-Parma, a son of Marie Anne's younger sister.
- Princess Hilda (15 February 1897 in Berg Castle – 8 September 1979 in Berg Castle), married in Berg Castle on 29 October 1930 Adolf 10th Prince of Schwarzenberg (18 August 1890 in Frauenberg – 27 February 1950 in Bordighera), without issue
- Princess Antonia (1899–1954), who married Rupprecht, Crown Prince of Bavaria as his second wife
- Princess Elisabeth (7 March 1901 in Luxembourg City – 2 August 1950 in Schloss Hohenburg), married in Schloss Hohenburg on 14 November 1922 Prince Ludwig Philipp of Thurn and Taxis (2 February 1901 in Regensburg – 22 April 1933 in Schloss Niederaichbach), son of Albert I, Prince of Thurn and Taxis, and had issue
- Princess Sophie (14 February 1902 in Berg Castle – 24 May 1941 in Munich), married at Schloss Hohenburg on 12 April 1921 Prince Ernst Heinrich of Saxony (9 December 1896 in Dresden – 14 June 1971 in Neckarhausen), youngest son of King Frederick Augustus III of Saxony, and had issue

== Titles and honours ==
=== Titles and styles ===
Although the duchy of Nassau was annexed by Prussia after the Austro-Prussian war of 1866, the title of Duke of Nassau was retained by William and his heirs.

=== Foreign honours ===
- Duchy of Anhalt: Grand Cross of Albert the Bear, 1868
- Austria-Hungary: Grand Cross of St. Stephen, 1890
- Baden:
  - Knight of the House Order of Fidelity, 1885
  - Knight of the Order of Berthold the First, 1885
- Kingdom of Bavaria: Knight of St. Hubert, 1892
- Brunswick: Grand Cross of Henry the Lion, 1873
- Denmark: Knight of the Elephant, 23 April 1876
- Netherlands: Grand Cross of the Netherlands Lion
- Kingdom of Prussia: Knight of the Black Eagle, 14 December 1890
- Saxe-Weimar-Eisenach: Grand Cross of the White Falcon, 1890
- Sweden-Norway:
  - Knight of the Seraphim, 19 June 1889
  - Grand Cross of St. Olav, 27 September 1897

== Notes and references ==
William IV of Luxembourg House of Nassau-Weilburg Cadet branch of the House of Nassau Born: 12 April 1852 Died: 25 February 1912
Regnal titles
Preceded by Adolphe	Grand Duke of Luxembourg; 1905–1912	Succeeded by Marie-Adélaïde
Titles in pretence
Preceded by Adolphe	— TITULAR — Duke of Nassau; 1905–1912; Reason for succession failure: Prussian annexation of Nassau in 1866	Succeeded by Marie-Adélaïde
