= Adolph Schwarzenberg =

Adolph
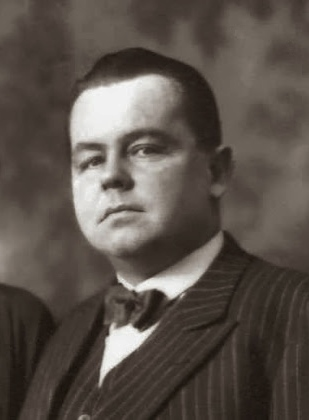

Prince of Schwarzenberg
- Reign: 1938-1950
- Predecessor: Johann II Nepomuk
- Successor: Heinrich
- Born: 18 August 1890; Hluboká nad Vltavou, Kingdom of Bohemia, Austria-Hungary
- Died: 27 February 1950 (aged 59); Bordighera, Italy
- Spouse: Princess Hilda of Luxembourg (m. 1930)
- House: House of Schwarzenberg
- Father: Johann II Nepomuk, 9th Prince of Schwarzenberg
- Mother: Countess Therese of Trauttmansdorff-Weinsberg

Adolph Schwarzenberg (18 August 1890 – 27 February 1950) was a notable landowner, entrepreneur and philanthropist. He was the eldest son of Johann (Czech: Jan) and Therese Schwarzenberg, née Trauttmansdorff-Weinsberg. An outspoken opponent of the Nazi regime, his properties were seized by the German Reich and by Third Czechoslovak Republic shortly before the Communist coup of 1948.

== Early life ==
Adolph was born into the wealthy and influential House of Schwarzenberg, as the first of eight children of Johann II Nepomuk, 9th Prince of Schwarzenberg by his wife, Countess Therese of Trauttmansdorff-Weinsberg. He was educated to eventually take over the management of extensive landholdings, real estate and industry, as well as substantial art collections and extensive archives from his father.

The family owned numerous noteworthy houses and residences, amongst them Český Krumlov Castle, Hluboká Castle, and Třeboň in South Bohemia, Postoloprty Castle, Schwarzenberg Palace (Prague) and Salm Palace in Prague, as well as Palais Schwarzenberg in Vienna.

He completed a law degree at the Czech University in Prague and fought in the First World War; he later served in the Czechoslovak army.

The First World War brought many changes to the Czech Lands. The First Czechoslovak Republic was proclaimed in its wake, on October 28, 1918; it was to last only 20 years, until the Munich Agreement, which preceded the Second World War and German occupation. As a small successor state to the sprawling Habsburg Empire, Czechoslovakia was home to a variety of ethnicities. The 30-year-old Adolph Schwarzenberg seemed better equipped than his father to deal with these new developments.

From 1923 onwards, he took over full responsibility for the running of all family business as his father's plenipotentiary. The land reform threatened to completely eradicate the family's estate. Adolph Schwarzenberg negotiated with the state and managed to safeguard a large part of the original property; the remaining estate still covered some 90.000 ha and most of the important real estate.

== Marriage and family life ==
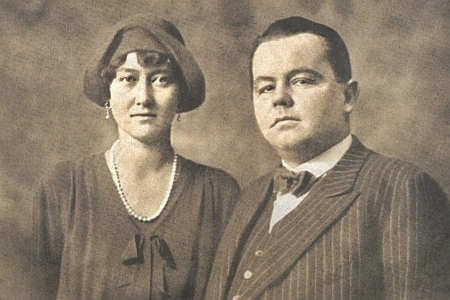
Adolph and Hilda Schwarzenberg, 1930s

Adolph Schwarzenberg married Princess Hilda of Luxembourg and Nassau (15 February 1897 – 8 September 1979) in 1930. The couple shared a passion for agriculture, wildlife and botany and spent much of their time at their Stará Obora hunting lodge near Hluboká. They acquired Mpala Farm in Laikipia, Kenya, in 1933.

Apart from bringing modern farming methods to the estate, Adolph built a hydroelectric powerstation there (some of the machinery was imported from his native Hluboká) and made exceptional improvements to his workers' living conditions. He also took the protection of wildlife seriously. Adolph later published a report for the Carnegie Endowment for International Peace on his activities and experience in Kenya. The farm was sold after his death and today is an important biodiversity conservation research center.

Adolph Schwarzenberg inherited the family estates after his father's death in 1938.
The couple had no children, and after his death, the remaining family estates would go to his brother's son Joseph.

== German occupation and exile ==
Adolph Schwarzenberg's stance against the Nazis and the Third Reich was clear even before the occupation of the Czech Lands and the outbreak of WWII: in 1937 he invited Edvard Beneš to Český Krumlov castle, where he gave him breakfast, as well as a million crowns, at the time a very considerable sum, for the defense of Czechoslovakia against Germany. He ordered black flags to be flown over his Vienna Palace during the Anschluss and, when Vienna's public gardens were closed to Jews, he had "Jews welcome" signs put up in his palace garden.

After the German occupation of the Czech Lands, he refused to receive Hitler at Český Krumlov. Neither did he consent to replace his Czech managers with ethnic Germans. He was considered pro-Czech and anti-German by the Nazi administration. All this inevitably made him a target for persecution and arrest. Adolph Schwarzenberg left occupied Czechoslovakia and settled temporarily at his house in Bordighera, Italy. He gave his adoptive son Heinrich responsibility for his property and emigrated via Switzerland to the United States of America. Heinrich Schwarzenberg, representing his adoptive father, proved no more inclined to the new rulers and on 17 August 1940 the Gestapo confiscated all of Adolph Schwarzenberg's property within the reach of the Third Reich. Baldur von Schirach claimed, in the course of the Nuremberg Trials, that the confiscation was caused by Schwarzenberg's refusal to take up arms for Hitler; however, other sources point to Adolph Schwarzenberg's general attitude and actions as a decisive factor. Heinrich Schwarzenberg was arrested on direct orders of Heinrich Himmler and taken to various police prisons before being incarcerated in Buchenwald concentration camp. He was released in 1944 and survived the remainder of the war as a forced labourer.

The entire Schwarzenberg property was placed under the control of the Gauleiter of Oberdonau, August Eigruber. Hermann Göring was also eager to benefit from the estate; a correspondence concerning the fate of the property ensued between various officials including Martin Bormann and Hans Heinrich Lammers, head of the Reichskanzlei. Hitler decided in favour of Gauleiter Eigruber. Eigruber was a major Nazi criminal, who was executed in 1947 for crimes committed at Mauthausen-Gusen concentration camp.

The Stará Obora hunting lodge was turned into a sanatorium for German officers. Inmates from Terezín concentration camp were forced to work there under horrendous conditions between 13. April and 25. October 1942. During his stay in the United States, Adolph Schwarzenberg supported the resistance and was an outspoken opponent of the Nazi regime, as confirmed by both Jan Masaryk and Consul General Karel Hudec. He enrolled at Columbia University to study for his second doctorate. His dissertation, a biography of Felix, Prince Schwarzenberg, was published in 1946. Adolph also worked with the Carnegie Endowment for International Peace, producing the report mentioned above and carrying out various activities in support of the organisation.

== Return to Europe and post-war period ==
After the end of the Second World War, Adolph and Hilda Schwarzenberg prepared for their return to Europe. They had spent almost five years in the United States.

They expected to return to Hluboká nad Vltavou and their Stará Obora hunting lodge, but were soon disappointed. National administration had been declared over his Czech estates in Adolph Schwarzenberg's absence and all his Czech property had been confiscated under the so-called Beneš decrees of 1945 by letter of 5 October 1945, notwithstanding the owner's track record of being a loyal Czechoslovak citizen and "passionate anti-Nazi". An appeal against the decree confiscation was lodged by Schwarzenberg's lawyer within the prescribed deadline of two weeks and is still pending after more than 60 years.

=== Legal controversy ===
In 1946 The Provincial National Committee in Prague compiled a report concerning the question of Adolph Schwarzenberg's property confiscation and stated that the owner could not be considered a traitor or a German and that consequently his property was not subject to the decree in question (No. 12/1945, coll.). Furthermore, it ordered that Schwarzenberg be paid 100 000 crowns to cover his expenses while a conclusion of procedures relating to his property was sought. This, however, did not deter the Czechoslovak government, increasingly under communist influence, from pocketing the estate without any compensation to the owner. As there was no legal basis for expropriating Adolph Schwarzenberg, on July 10, 1947, the Czechoslovak parliament promulgated a special law, 143/1947, coll., later to be known as Lex Schwarzenberg to secure his business assets for the state without giving a reason or offering compensation. This law has proved to be highly controversial as it is a piece of arbitrary ad hominem legislation. As such it contravenes the Czechoslovak Constitution of 1920, which was in force at the time, as well as the current Constitution of the Czech Republic. It also contravenes the Universal Declaration of Human Rights and the International Covenant on Civil and Political Rights. By the time Lex Schwarzenberg came into effect, however, Czechoslovakia was well on its way to becoming a communist system: Klement Gottwald, who would become the country's Stalinist dictator, had been Prime Minister since 1946. The Communist Party controlled many of the important ministries, while some of the non-communist members of the government, such as Zdeněk Fierlinger, were communists in all but name. The ministries of agriculture and the interior were jointly responsible for the decision concerning Adolph Schwarzenberg's appeal file under the provisions of decree No. 12/1945.

== Last years ==
The Czechoslovak authorities' behaviour towards him came as a distasteful surprise to Adolph Schwarzenberg, which is best illustrated by a conversation he had as early as January 1940. On a train to Switzerland, he met an acquaintance, the banker Holzer, director of Escompte Bank in Prague, who engaged him in conversation and wanted to know his motives for leaving the Reich. He explained that since the takeover of the Nazi regime life at home had become an opprobrium, and that he could only live in a free country. He went on to say that Germany would certainly lose the war, and "all that nonsense" of a "New Regime" would finally come to an end; only then would he return to his estates. Holzer promptly reported this conversation to the Sicherheitsdienst.

While Schwarzenberg's predictions concerning the outcome of the war and the long-term prospects of the "Thousand Year Reich" were correct, post-war developments proved his optimism regarding his own return to his home country to be misguided. The communist takeover of February 1948 put an end to all hope for Schwarzenberg to return home or seek redress.

He made his last home in Katsch, a small village in Austria, where he and Hilda once more lived in a hunting lodge, and occasionally spent time at his house in Bordighera, Italy, where he died on 27 February 1950.

== Ancestry ==
Ancestors of Adolph Schwarzenberg

16. Joseph II, 6th Prince of Schwarzenberg
8. Johann Adolf II, 7th Prince of Schwarzenberg
17. Princess and Duchess Pauline of Arenberg
4. Adolf Joseph, 8th Prince of Schwarzenberg
18. Prince Moritz of Liechtenstein
9. Princess Eleonore of Liechtenstein
19. Countess Leopoldine Esterházy de Galantha
2. Johann II Nepomuk, 9th Prince of Schwarzenberg
20. Johann I Joseph, Prince of Liechtenstein
10. Aloys II, Prince of Liechtenstein
21. Landgravine Josepha of Fürstenberg-Weitra
5. Princess Ida of Liechtenstein
22. Count Franz de Paula Kinsky of Wchinitz and Tettau
11. Countess Franziska Kinsky of Wchinitz and Tettau
23. Countess Therese Antonia of Wrbna and Freudenthal
1. Adolph, 10th Prince of Schwarzenberg
24. Johann, 2nd Prince of Trauttmansdorff-Weinsberg
12. Ferdinand Joachim, 3rd Prince of Trauttmansdorff-Weinsberg
25. Landgravine Elizabeth of Fürstenberg-Weitra
6. Karl, 4th Prince of Trauttmansdorff-Weinsberg
26. Prince Karl Franz Anton of Liechtenstein
13. Princess Anna of Liechtenstein
27. Countess Franzisca of Wrbna and Freudenthal
3. Countess Therese of Trauttmansdorff-Weinsberg
28. Margrave Edoardo Pallavicini
14. Margrave Alfons of Pallavicini
29. Countess Maria Josepha of Hardegg
7. Margravine Josephine of Pallavicini
30. Friedrich Karl, Landgrave of Fürstenberg-Weitra
15. Landgravine Gabriele of Fürstenberg-Weitra
31. Princess Maria Theresia of Schwarzenberg
