= Adolphe, Grand Duke of Luxembourg =

Grand Duke of Luxembourg from 1890 to 1905

Adolphe
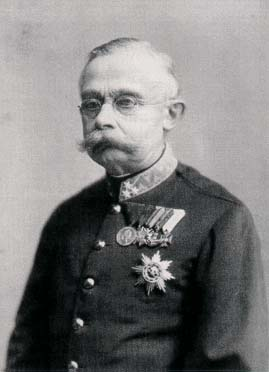

Grand Duke of Luxembourg
- Reign: 23 November 1890 – 17 November 1905
- Predecessor: William III
- Successor: William IV

Duke of Nassau
- Reign: 20 August 1839 – 20 September 1866
- Predecessor: William
- Successor: Nassau annexed by the Kingdom of Prussia
- Born: 24 July 1817; Biebrich Palace, Wiesbaden, Duchy of Nassau
- Died: 17 November 1905 (aged 88); Schloss Hohenburg, Lenggries, Kingdom of Bavaria, German Empire
- Burial: Schlosskirche of Schloss Weilburg (since 1953)
- Spouse: Grand Duchess Elizabeth Mikhailovna of Russia (m. 1844; died 1845) Princess Adelheid-Marie of Anhalt-Dessau (m. 1851)
- Issue Among others...: William IV, Grand Duke of Luxembourg; Hilda, Grand Duchess of Baden
- House: Nassau-Weilburg
- Father: Wilhelm, Duke of Nassau
- Mother: Princess Louise of Saxe-Hildburghausen
- Religion: Protestantism

Adolphe (Adolf Wilhelm August Karl Friedrich; 24 July 1817 – 17 November 1905) was Grand Duke of Luxembourg from 23 November 1890 to his death on 17 November 1905. The first grand duke from the House of Nassau-Weilburg, he succeeded King William III of the Netherlands, ending the personal union between the Netherlands and Luxembourg. Adolphe was Duke of Nassau from 20 August 1839 to 20 September 1866, when the Duchy was annexed to the Kingdom of Prussia.

Adolphe became Duke of Nassau in August 1839, following the death of his father William. The Duchy was annexed to Prussia after Austria's defeat in the Austro-Prussian War. From 1815 to 1839, the Grand Duchy of Luxembourg was ruled by the kings of the Netherlands as a province of the Netherlands. Following the Treaty of London (1839), the Grand Duchy became independent but remained in personal union with the Netherlands. Following the death of his sons, the Dutch king William III had no male heirs to succeed him. In the Netherlands, females were allowed to succeed to the throne. Luxembourg, however, followed Salic law which barred females from succession. Thus, upon King William III's death, the crown of the Netherlands passed to his only daughter, Wilhelmina, while that of Luxembourg passed to Adolphe in accordance with the Nassau Family Pact. Adolphe died in 1905 and was succeeded by his son, William IV.

== Biography ==
Born into the House of Nassau, Adolphe was a son of William, Duke of Nassau (1792–1839) and Princess Louise of Saxe-Hildburghausen.

=== Duke of Nassau ===
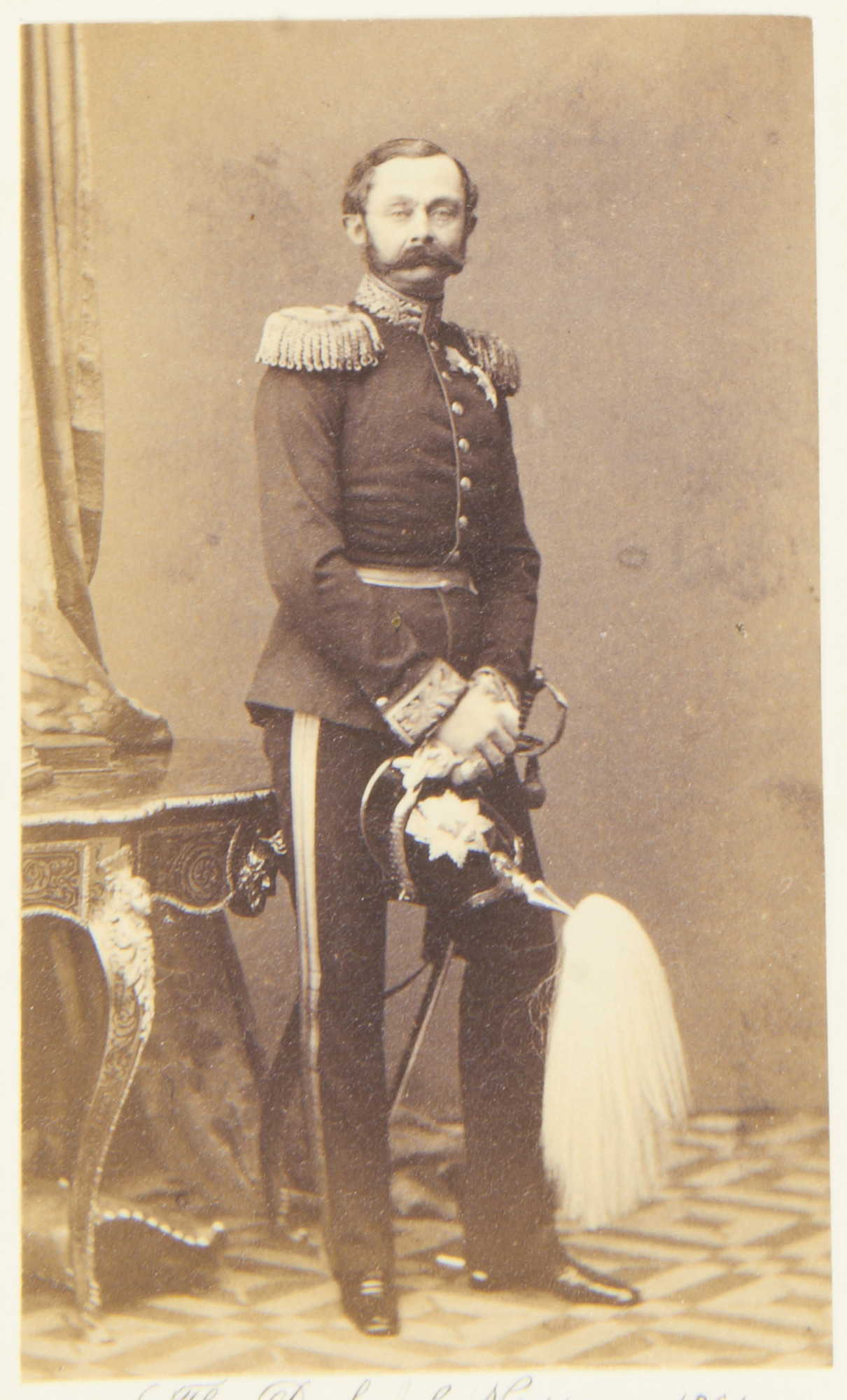
Adolphe of Nassau when he was Duke of Nassau 1860

Adolphe became Duke of Nassau in August 1839 at the age of 22, after the death of his father. Wiesbaden had by this time become the capital of the Duchy, and Adolphe took up residence in the newly constructed Stadtschloss in 1841. On 4 March 1848 he consented to the population of Nassau's nine "Demands of the Nassauers". A few years later, however, he revoked his liberal views and took a strongly conservative and reactionary course. In general, though, he was seen as a popular ruler. He supported the Austrian Empire in the Austro-Prussian War of 1866. After Austria's defeat, Nassau was annexed to the Kingdom of Prussia and he lost his throne on 20 September 1866.

=== Grand Duke of Luxembourg ===
In 1879, Adolphe's niece Emma of Waldeck and Pyrmont, the daughter of another of his half-sisters, married William III, King of the Netherlands and Grand Duke of Luxembourg. In 1890, upon William's death without surviving male issue, their only daughter Wilhelmina succeeded to the Dutch throne, but was excluded from the succession to Luxembourg. The Grand Duchy, which had been linked to the Netherlands in personal union since 1815, passed to Adolphe in accordance with the Nassau Family Pact.

Adolphe was King-Grand Duke William III's 17th cousin once removed through a male-only line, but was also his 3rd cousin as they both descended from William IV, Prince of Orange (he being the paternal great-grandson of William IV's eldest daughter Princess Carolina of Orange-Nassau). He had, in fact, taken over the regency of Luxembourg for a short time during William III's illness.

Adolphe was already 73 years old by this time and knew little of Luxembourgish politics. He mostly abstained from day-to-day governing; Prime Minister Paul Eyschen, in office since 1888, took care of the affairs of state. This established a convention that the monarch would remain absent from the politics of the day, despite being vested with considerable reserve powers on paper. In 1902 Adolphe appointed his son William as Lieutenant-Representative.

He died in 1905 at his summer home, Schloss Hohenburg in Lenggries, and in 1953 was buried in the crypt of the church of Schloss Weilburg.

=== Personal life ===
On 31 January 1844, Adolphe married firstly in St. Petersburg, Grand Duchess Elizabeth Mikhailovna of Russia, niece of Emperor Nicholas I of Russia. She died less than a year after giving birth to a stillborn daughter. Adolphe built the Russian Orthodox Church of Saint Elizabeth 1847 to 1855 as her funeral church.

On 23 April 1851, he remarried to Princess Adelheid-Marie of Anhalt-Dessau. They had five children, of whom only two lived to the age of eighteen and became prince and princess of Luxembourg:

- William IV, Grand Duke of Luxembourg (1852–1912)
- Prince Friedrich Paul Wilhelm of Nassau (Biebrich, 23 September 1854 – Biebrich, 23 October 1855)
- Princess Marie Bathildis Wilhelmine Charlotte of Nassau (Biebrich, 14 November 1857 – Biebrich, 28 December 1857)
- Prince Franz Joseph Wilhelm of Nassau (Biebrich, 30 January 1859 – Vienna, 2 April 1875)
- Princess Hilda Charlotte Wilhelmine (1864–1952), married Friedrich II, Grand Duke of Baden.

In 1892, Grand Duke Adolphe conferred the personal title of Prince Bernadotte in the nobility of Luxembourg as well as the hereditary title of Count of Wisborg on his Swedish nephew, Oscar, who had lost his Swedish titles after marrying without his father's approval. Wisborg (also spelled Visborg) is the ruins of an old castle in the city of Visby within Oscar's former Dukedom of Gotland, but the title itself was created in the nobility of Luxembourg.

== Adelsverein ==
On April 20, 1842, the Adelsverein, Society for the Protection of German Immigrants in Texas, was organised in the Grand Duke's castle at Biebrich on the Rhine. He was named the Protector of the organisation. The Verein was responsible for the large emigration of Germans to Texas in the 19th century, and on January 9, 1843, established the 4,428 acre Nassau Plantation in Fayette County, Texas and named it after the Grand Duke.

== Honours ==
- Russian Empire: Knight of St. Andrew, 20 September 1839
- (Saxe-Coburg and Gotha) (Duchy of Saxe-Altenburg) (Saxe-Meiningen) Ernestine duchies: Grand Cross of the Saxe-Ernestine House Order, October 1839
- Baden:
  - Knight of the House Order of Fidelity, 1839
  - Grand Cross of the Zähringer Lion, 1839
- Kingdom of Bavaria: Knight of St. Hubert, 1839
- Kingdom of Hanover:
  - Grand Cross of the Royal Guelphic Order, 1839
  - Knight of St. George, 1860
- Denmark: Knight of the Elephant, 1 February 1840
- Kingdom of Prussia: Knight of the Black Eagle, 12 March 1840
- Austrian Empire: Grand Cross of St. Stephen, 1840
- Grand Duchy of Hesse: Grand Cross of the Ludwig Order, 8 January 1843
- Saxe-Weimar-Eisenach: Grand Cross of the White Falcon, 1 November 1843
- Württemberg: Grand Cross of the Württemberg Crown, 1846
- Oldenburg: Grand Cross of the Order of Duke Peter Friedrich Ludwig, with Golden Crown, 9 September 1849
- Electorate of Hesse: Grand Cross of the Golden Lion, 16 July 1850
- Ascanian duchies: Grand Cross of Albert the Bear, 12 February 1851
- Sweden-Norway:
  - Knight of the Seraphim, 10 October 1856
  - Grand Cross of St. Olav, 12 July 1858
- Kingdom of Saxony: Knight of the Rue Crown, 1857
- Nassau:
  - Joint Grand Master of the Order of the Gold Lion of Nassau, 16 March 1858
  - Founder and Grand Master of the Order of Adolphe of Nassau, 8 May 1858
- Belgium: Grand Cordon of the Order of Leopold, 10 August 1861
- Luxembourg: Grand Master of the Order of the Oak Crown, 23 November 1890

=== Arms ===
Coat of arms of Adolphe, 1890 - 1898

Coat of arms of Adolphe and Grand Duke of Luxembourg in general, 1898 - 2000

== Ancestry ==
Ancestors of Adolphe, Grand Duke of Luxembourg

8. Charles Christian, Prince of Nassau-Weilburg
4. Frederick William, Prince of Nassau-Weilburg
9. Princess Carolina of Orange-Nassau
2. William, Duke of Nassau
10. Wilhelm Georg, Burgrave of Kirchberg
5. Burgravine Louise Isabella of Kirchberg
11. Princess Isabelle Auguste Reuss of Greiz
1. Adolph, Grand Duke of Luxembourg
12. Ernest Frederick III, Duke of Saxe-Hildburghausen
6. Frederick, Duke of Saxe-Altenburg
13. Princess Ernestine of Saxe-Weimar-Eisenach
3. Princess Louise of Saxe-Hildburghausen
14. Charles II, Grand Duke of Mecklenburg
7. Duchess Charlotte Georgine of Mecklenburg-Strelitz
15. Princess Friederike of Hesse-Darmstadt

Adolphe, Grand Duke of Luxembourg House of Nassau-Weilburg Cadet branch of the House of Nassau Born: 24 July 1817 Died: 17 November 1905
Regnal titles
Preceded by William	Duke of Nassau; 1839–1866	Succeeded by Wilhelm I of Prussia as Prince of Nassau
Preceded by William III	Grand Duke of Luxembourg; 1890–1905	Succeeded by William IV
Titles in pretence
Loss of title Austro-Prussian War	— TITULAR — Duke of Nassau; 1866–1905	Succeeded by William IV of Luxembourg
