= Lenggries =

- Municipality
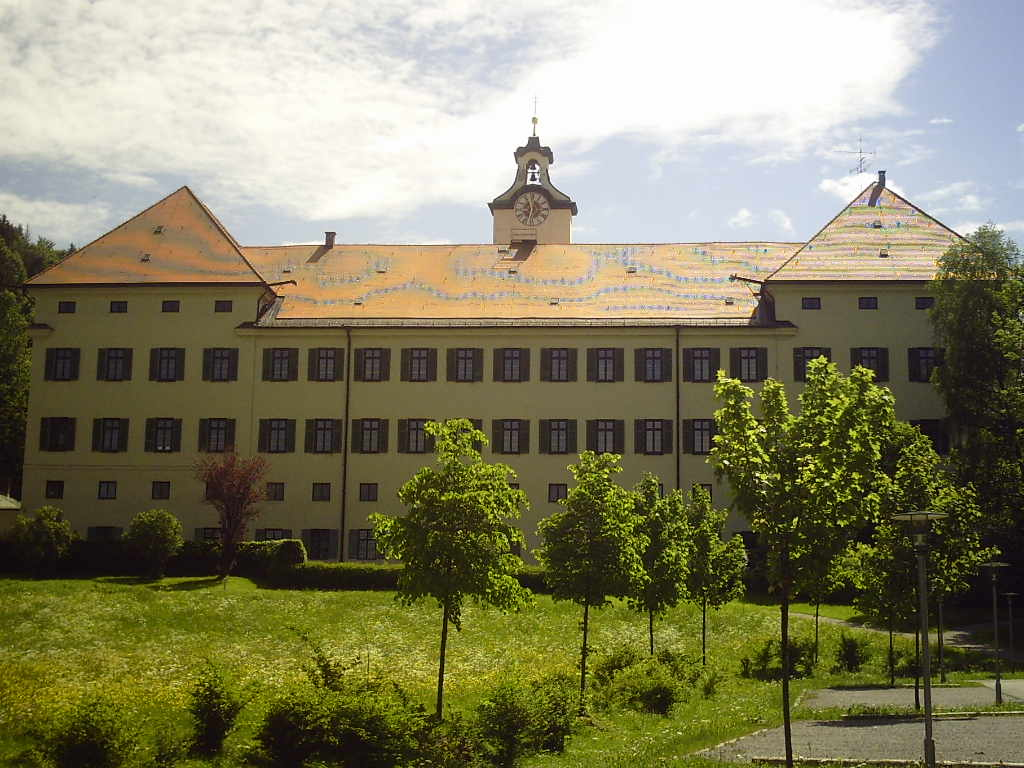
- Schloss Hohenburg

- Coat of arms

- Location of Lenggries within Bad Tölz-Wolfratshausen district
- Interactive map of Lenggries
- Location within Germany Location within Bavaria
- Coordinates: 47°40′49″N 11°34′26″E
- Country: Germany
- State: Bavaria
- Admin. region: Oberbayern
- District: Bad Tölz-Wolfratshausen
- Subdivisions: 7 Ortsteile

Government
  - Mayor (2020–26): Stefan Klaffenbacher (FW)

Area
  - Total: 242.90 km^{2} (93.78 sq mi)
- Elevation: 679 m (2,228 ft)

Population (2025-12-31)
  - Total: 10,176
  - Density: 41.894/km^{2} (108.50/sq mi)
- Time zone: UTC+01:00 (CET)
  - Summer (DST): UTC+02:00 (CEST)
- Postal codes: 83661
- Dialling codes: 08042, 08045 (Fall)
- Vehicle registration: TÖL
- Website: www.lenggries.de

Lenggries is a municipality and a village in Bavaria, Germany. It is the center of the Isarwinkel, the region along the Isar between Bad Tölz and Wallgau. The town has about 9,500 inhabitants. By area, it is the largest rural municipality ("Gemeinde") in what was formerly West Germany, and the 7th-largest overall. (All six currently larger Gemeinden are in Brandenburg.)

== Etymology ==
The name Lenggries is derived from Lenngengrieze (long Gries), a long rubble field with deposits of debris from the bed of the Isar.

== Geography ==
Lenggries sits on the Isar River before it transitions into the Alpine foothills. To the east are the Tegernsee Mountains, to the west lies the home mountain of Lenggries known as the Brauneck with an elevation of over 1,555 meters above sea level. The Brauneck is a well known ski area tied together by lifts. The town of Lenggries sits 700 meters above sea level.

== History ==
The town was established before 1257. For many years, Lenggries was the only settlement on the "long Gries" ruled by the Barons of Hörwarth from the Hofmark castle, the Hohenburg. In 1705, the first resistance against the Austrians was organized in Lenggries. This later led to the killing of many peasants in a battle known as Sendling's Night of Murder. From 1808 to 1818, edicts from the Bavarian municipality formed Lenggries into a politically independent municipality. In 1924, Lenggries was connected to the railroad (known today as the Bayerische Oberlandbahn), and tourism first became important to Lenggries' economy. From 1935 until 1939, Gebirgsjäger (mountain infantry) were stationed in Lenggries.

== Economy ==
The economy is mostly dependent on tourism, primarily focused on hiking and with emphasis on the forests of the area.

== Transport ==
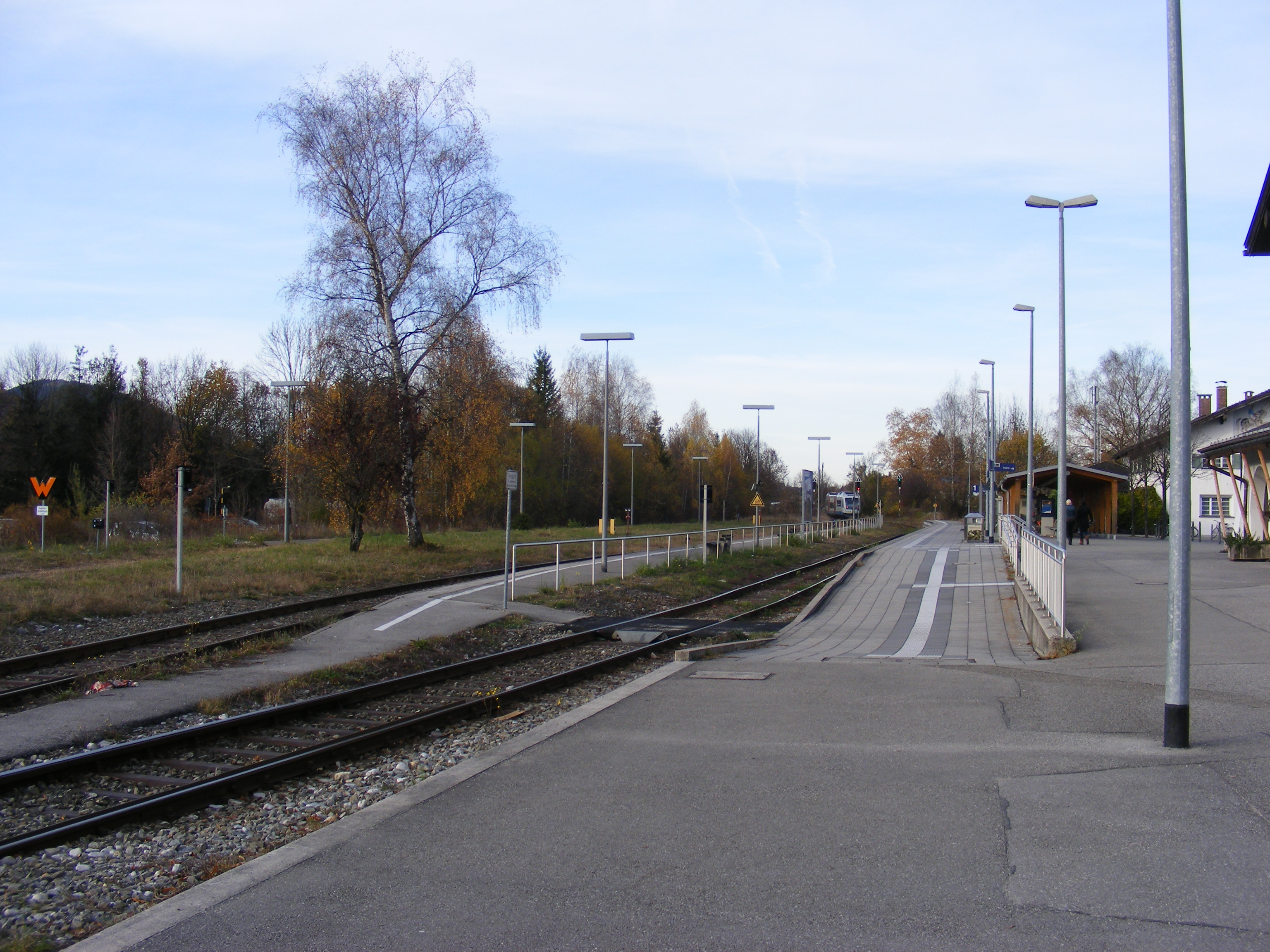
Lenggries railway station

The town is the terminus (terminal) of the Munich — Lenggries railway (Green line) operated by Bayerische Oberlandbahn (BOB).

== Culture and attractions ==
- Church of St. James (Italian baroque style, built 1722)
- Hohenburg, medieval castle ruin
- Calvary hill near Hohenburg (geometric style, as opposed to the one in Bad Tölz)
- Schloss Hohenburg, exiled home of Adolf I of Luxembourg, now housing two girls' schools
- Protestant Church (built 1952)
- The Heimatmuseum Lenggries (Home museum) exhibits locally related items.
- The Brittany Bridge, which is named after a partnership with the region in north-western France.

== People ==
- Claus Bergen (painter)
- Martina Ertl (Alpine skier)
- Annemarie Gerg (Alpine skier)
- Hilde Gerg (Alpine skier)
- Michaela Gerg-Leitner (Alpine skier)
- Albert Grünwedel (archeologist)

== Panorama ==
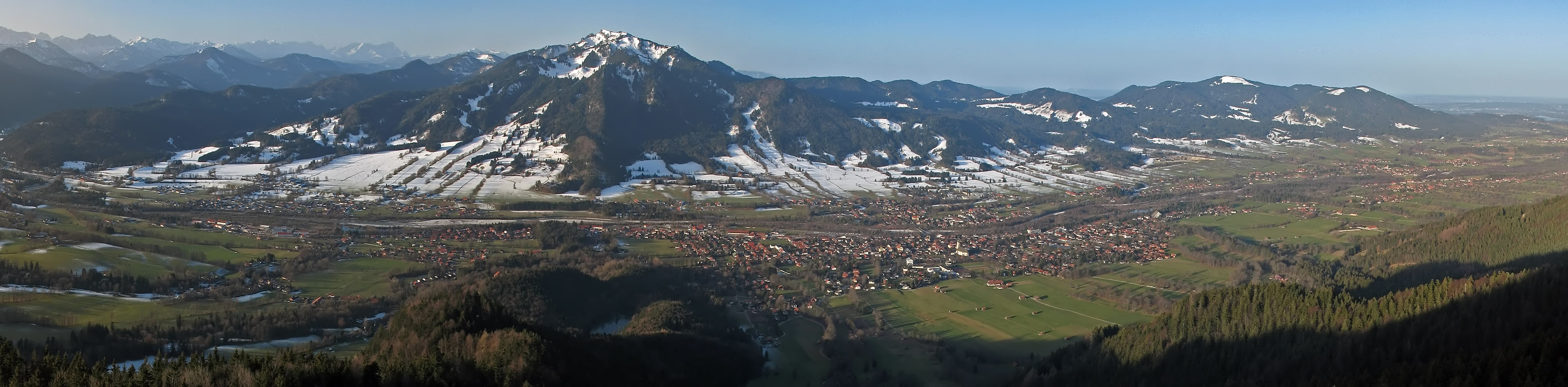
