= Ferenc Nádasdy (cultural preservationist) =

Hungarian aristocrat

- Count of Nádasd and Fogarasföld
- Full name: Count Ferenc Nádasdy de Nádasd et Fogarasföld
- Born: July 1, 1937; Budapest, Kingdom of Hungary
- Died: January 15, 2013 (aged 75)
- Noble family: House of Nádasdy
- Spouse: Andrea Nikolits de Kékes (born 1933)
- Issue: none
- Father: Count Ferenc Nádasdy de Nádasd et Fogarasföld
- Mother: Mária Radó

Ferenc Nádasdy (1 July 1937 – 15 January 2013) was a Hungarian aristocrat and a member of the House of Nádasdy.

== Biography ==
He was born as Count Ferenc Nádasdy de Nádasd et Fogarasföld (Hungarian: nádasdi és fogarasföldi gróf Nádasdy Ferenc) on 1 July 1937, as the only son of Count Ferenc Mátyás and actress Mária Radó. He had two elder sisters, Júlia Franciska Mária and Katalin. His father was killed in the Second World War on 26 October 1944.

The Communist regime of Hungary prevented him from pursuing his academic studies. As a result, he emigrated to Austria after the Hungarian Revolution of 1956. Later, he moved to Canada, where married Andrea Nikolits de Kékes in Ontario on 10 October 1982. They had no children.

Nádasdy visited Hungary for the first time in 1969. After the end of Communism in Hungary, he returned to his homeland and settled down in Nádasdladány, a former estate of his family. He founded the Nádasdy Foundation in 1991, the aim of which was the cultural preservation of the Nádasdy heritage. He initiated the restoration of the Nádasdy Mansion in 1993.

Nádasdy died after a long illness on 15 January 2013. According to the foundation and the Magyar Távirati Iroda (MTI), he was the last male member of the Hungarian line of the Nádasdy family; however, the family survives – after seven centuries in Hungary – among other in the United States with his first cousin, Count Gábor Nádasdy de Nádasd et Fogarasfold (born 1940), the next head of the House of Nádasdy.

== Sources ==
- Nádasdy Foundation (in Hungarian)
