= Trădătorii =

Romanian reality television series

- Also known as: The Traitors - Trădătorii
- Genre: Reality; Game show
- Based on: De Verraders by: Marc Pos; Jasper Hoogendoorn
- Presented by: Ana Ularu
- Country of origin: Romania
- Original language: Romanian
- No. of seasons: 1
- No. of episodes: 12

Production
- Executive producer: Antonii Mangov
- Producer: Adrian Batista
- Production locations: Nádasdy Mansion, Nádasdladány, Central Transdanubia, Hungary
- Camera setup: Multi-camera

Original release
- Network: Pro TV, Voyo

Trădătorii (Romanian pronunciation: [trədəˈtorij]) is a Romanian reality television series broadcast on Pro TV and VOYO, based on the Dutch series De Verraders, which premiered on 30 October 2025.

Following the premise of other versions of De Verraders, the show features a group of contestants participating in a game similar to the party game Cluedo and Mafia as they stay in a historic luxury hotel. During their stay, a small group of contestants become the titular "Traitors," and must work together to eliminate the other contestants.

The show is hosted by Ana Ularu.

== Format ==
A group of contestants arrive at a castle in the Central Transdanubia, Hungary with hopes of winning a large cash prize that is built up through missions. The players are referred to as the "Faithful" but among them are the "Traitors" – a group of contestants selected by the host, whose goal is to eliminate the Faithfuls and claim the prize for themselves. Should the Faithful contestants eliminate all the Traitors, they will share the prize fund, but if any Traitors make it to the end, they steal the money.

Most nights, the Traitors come together and decide upon one Faithful contestant to "murder" and that person leaves the game immediately. The remaining Faithful contestants do not know who has been eliminated until the following day when that person does not enter the castle for breakfast. The first murder takes place before the first banishment. After that the murders usually take place after the banishments. The group then takes part in a mission to add money to the prize fund. Some challenges also offer an opportunity for players to visit the Armory where one player is secretly awarded the shield which gives the player immunity from being murdered, but not from the banishment vote. An attempted murder on the shield holder will result in no player being eliminated.

At the end of each day, the players participate in the Round Table, where they discuss who to vote out before individually voting for a player to be banished. Players cast their votes privately then reveal their votes in turn to everyone. They may give a brief rationale for their vote. The person who received the most votes is eliminated and reveals their affiliation. When a Traitor is eliminated, the remaining Traitors are given the opportunity to recruit another player.

Once the game has reached the final four, the remaining players participate in the final challenge. The players are given a choice to "Banish Again" or to "End Game." A unanimous "End Game" vote concludes the game, while a single vote to "Banish Again" results in another banishment vote, followed by another choice between "Banish Again" or "End Game." When the game ends, if all remaining players are Faithful, then the prize money is divided evenly among them. However, if any Traitors remain, they win the entire pot.

== Production ==
=== Development ===
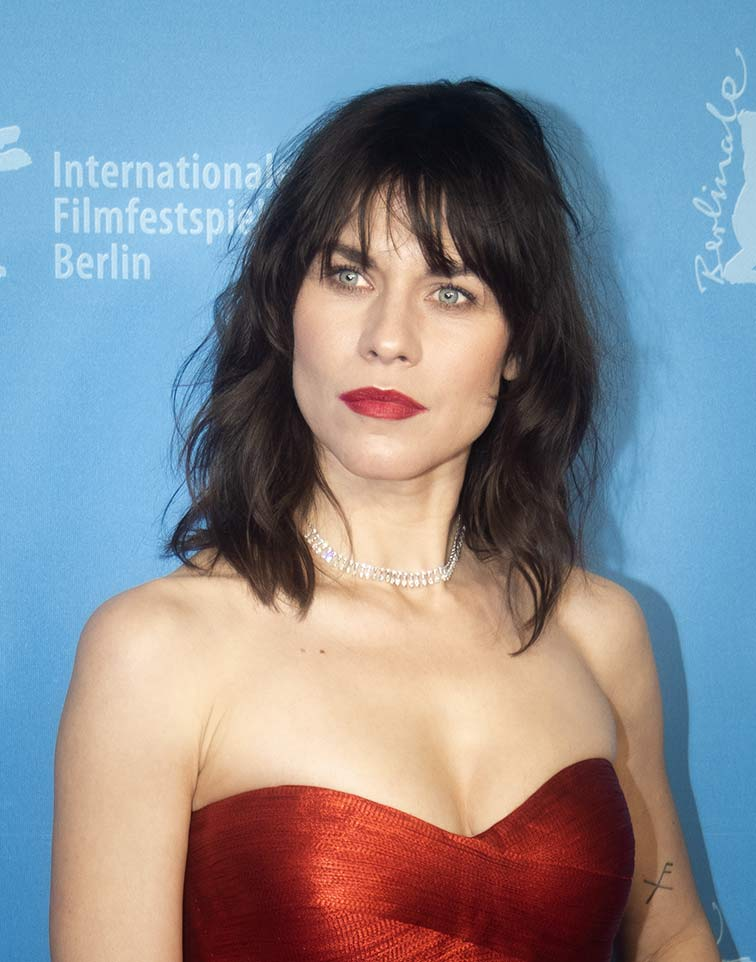
The host Ana Ularu.

In September 2024, it was revealed that Pro TV had commissioned a Romanian adaptation of The Traitors. On April 2, 2025, Pro TV officially confirmed this news, with the applications being open immediately for civilian contestants. Following the announcement of the series, Antonii Mangov, the Programming Director Pro TV said: "We have always wanted to bring our viewers high-quality productions that align with the expectations of the Pro TV audience. That is why we are extremely excited to announce that we are starting filming for this new format, The Traitors – Trădătorii, which has captivated audiences around the world. We are confident that our viewers will enjoy every second of it." Additionally, Adrian Batista – Head of Reality & Entertainment Content – states that "After 25 years in television and an unconventional journey across all genres, I had begun to believe that creative effort would be almost entirely focused on trying to be socially relevant and entertaining at the same time — aiming for innovation and clever adaptation for the Romanian audience. ‘The Traitors’ is a format that requires none of that. The best content unfolds organically, right in front of the surprised gaze of cameras completely ignored by the players. It is an absolutely fascinating social experiment — something unprecedented on our television screens. Beyond inspired casting choices, all you need to do is respect the rules of the format: don't interfere with the content, don't influence the dynamic, don't get involved — it's not your job. Every decision, absolutely every one, must come from the players. As a producer and guardian of the format, your job is to let things happen. And it's incredible how compelling it becomes when 24 ordinary people control the entire narrative. The mechanics are simple: the faithful must identify and eliminate the traitors, while the traitors must avoid being discovered and “murder” one innocent player each night. The way each person plays a version of themselves — both real and strategic — the way they engage in a game where every word, gesture, and facial expression means something and may have consequences, makes ‘The Traitors’ perhaps the most addictive television show in recent years. What I can reveal is that we have an outstanding cast and a brilliant Ana Ularu in the role of the game master. It's a fascinating thriller, completely unscripted, but with a dynamic far beyond that of any fictional script. I look forward to welcoming you on Pro TV and Voyo, confident that by the end, you'll be eagerly anticipating Season 2."

On 16 June 2025, with the first teaser trailer released, it was announced that romanian actress, Ana Ularu would be hosting the show. Following the announcement, Ularu said: "My role is a wonderful one; it’s something very new for me, something I need to adapt to – I have to create a kind of hybrid character who lives in the world of the game and the castle, but who uses me as fuel. So, where the host character begins and where Ana surfaces is more in the realm of humor and empathy. First of all, what attracted me the most is the fact that I used to play Mafia endlessly during university, and my favorite position was being the game master – we used to call it the judge. I really enjoy observing how human nature and the mind function and evolve under stress. I find it incredibly interesting to witness the ability of people – who don’t do this for a living – to transform and adapt internally in order to serve a purpose. Many of the contestants are here for the human experience, which I find amazing, because inside all of us there’s a playful spirit that always needs to be nourished. It doesn’t matter how old we are or in what context – we need to satisfy that inner child who just wants to play. I can’t wait for people at home to watch the show, because I’m sure they will enjoy it and feel every stage of the game intensely."

== Series overview ==
Series overview
Series	Contestants	Episodes	Originally released		Winner(s)	Runner(s)-up	Prize	Traitors
Series	Contestants	Episodes	First released	Last released	Winner(s)	Runner(s)-up	Prize	Traitors
1	24	12	30 October 2025	11 December 2025	Ines Stana (Traitor)	Marius Gadină; Daria Nica; Daniela Șendrea (Faithfuls)	€84,000	Radu Bănceanu Ionel Tămaș Alexa Vangu Ines Stana (Recruited in ep. 7) Johnny Bădeliță (Recruited in ep. 9)

=== Series 1 (2025) ===
No. overall	No. in series	Title	Original release date	RO viewers (millions)
1	1	"Episode 1"	30 October 2025	0.66
2	2	"Episode 2"	5 November 2025	N/A
3	3	"Episode 3"	6 November 2025	0.42
4	4	"Episode 4"	12 November 2025	N/A
5	5	"Episode 5"	13 November 2025	N/A
6	6	"Episode 6"	19 November 2025	N/A
7	7	"Episode 7"	20 November 2025	N/A
8	8	"Episode 8"	26 November 2025	N/A
9	9	"Episode 9"	27 November 2025	N/A
10	10	"Episode 10"	3 December 2025	N/A
11	11	"Episode 11"	4 December 2025	N/A
12	12	"Episode 12"	11 December 2025	0.56
