= Monarchism in Bavaria after 1918 =

Aspect of Bavarian history

The Bavarian monarchy ended with the declaration of a republic after the Anif declaration by King Ludwig III on 12 November 1918 as a consequence of Germany's defeat in the First World War. Monarchism was thereafter particularly strong between 1918 and 1933, when an attempt was made to either make Crown Prince Rupprecht king or general state commissioner in an attempt to forestall the rise of the Nazis to power in the state.

== Background ==
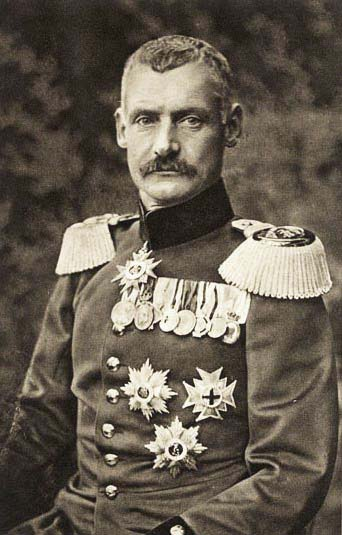
Rupprecht, Crown Prince of Bavaria in uniform during World War I

Bavaria, ruled by the House of Wittelsbach from 1180, became a kingdom in 1805. In November 1918, in the face of growing unrest in Germany, the last prime minister of the Kingdom of Bavaria, Otto Ritter von Dandl, attempted to persuade the Bavarian King Ludwig III to relinquish the Bavarian throne. Ludwig was unwilling to do so but instead published the Anif Declaration on 12 November in which he absolved all government employees, officers, and soldiers of the Bavarian Army of their oath of loyalty to him. The following day, Kurt Eisner proclaimed himself prime minister of Bavaria and informed the public that the King had abdicated, despite that declaration having made no reference to an abdication. He published Ludwig's statement word for word, with a postscript stating that the new "People's State" accepted Ludwig's abdication. The postscript added that the Wittelsbachs were welcome to return if they accepted the status of private citizens and did not act against the new government.

The crown prince, still in military service at the time, made it clear that he had no intention of relinquishing his rights to the Bavarian throne and instead demanded that a freely elected Bavarian national assembly decide the future system of government. The Bavarian monarch was one of only five of the 22 German potentates not to relinquish his rights to the throne, the others being King Friedrich August III of Saxony, Duke Karl Eduard of Saxe-Coburg and Gotha, Prince Friedrich of Waldeck and Pyrmont and Grand Duke Ernst Ludwig of Hesse.

== Monarchism 1918–1933 ==
=== Compensation of the Wittelsbachs ===
The Bavarian government initially confiscated all property and possessions of the House of Wittelsbach, declaring them property of the state. It also stopped all payments to the royal family. As legal grounds for this decision, the government used the constitution of 1818, which it interpreted as the Wittelsbachs having relinquished their fideicommis in favor of the state. Additionally, in 1834 an act granted the king an annual financial allowance and the right to use the royal palaces (civil list), which the Bavarian government used as a confirmation of their view that all possessions of the Wittelsbachs belonged to the state.

In 1921, the House of Wittelsbach obtained an expert opinion that the parts of the constitution of 1818 in regards to their property were only valid as long as Bavaria remained a monarchy. After negotiations between the government and the Wittelsbachs, the Wittelsbacher Ausgleichsfonds (Wittelsbach compensation fund) was established in 1923. In this settlement, the former royal family was permitted to retain a number of palaces, large forest holdings, living rights in a number of other palaces, art collections and their secret house archives. A financial compensation was also awarded but the inflation of 1923 made the latter almost worthless. Most of the palaces and the art collection were made accessible to the public by the crown prince.

=== Monarchist organisations ===
A number of monarchist organisations were formed after the monarchy was abolished.

The Bayerische Königspartei (English: Bavarian Royal Party) was formed in November 1919. It had the declared aim of restoring the monarchy and the safeguarding of the Bavarian identity, fearing a reduction of Bavaria to a Prussian province. The party did not have the support of the royal family who avoided any association and did not take part in any elections, instead concentrating on trying to force a referendum on the form of government in Bavaria. When it became known that high-ranking members of the party had had contacts to separatists of the Rhenish Republic and to France, it lost most of its members and was dissolved in 1926, with most members joining the Bayerischer Heimat- und Königsbund "In Treue fest".

The Bayerischer Heimat- und Königsbund "In Treue fest" (English: Bavarian Homeland and Royal Federation "Firm in Fidelity") was formed in 1921. Its motto, "In Treue fest", was the motto of the Bavarian Army and the Bavarian order of St. Hubertus.

This organisation, too, was not supported by the crown prince, who felt that the Bavarian monarchy should not be associated with a political party or organisation. By 1932, it had a membership of 70,000 and was organised statewide, held special royal days and operated a social service and a youth organisation. With the rise of the Nazis to power, the federation was outlawed and its leading members arrested. Resistance movements by former members were destroyed by the Gestapo between 1935 and 1939 and its leader, Adolf Freiherr von Harnier, died the day after being liberated by US forces through the effects of his incarceration in Straubing.

Adolf Hitler's 1923 "Beer Hall Putsch" in Munich had the restoration of the monarchy as its pretext. However, it was carried out without the crown prince's knowledge and support, and collapsed. Rupprecht again did not want to take the crown by illegal means and thereby assured himself of Hitler's lasting enmity. Adolf Hitler made it clear at the time (and at his trial) that he believed in a Republic (in the strict sense of a land ruled by the people) and opposed the idea of a monarchy. "Monarchism", in a Bavarian context, was not the belief that a King should have direct power, but rather the belief that a monarch should be part of a traditional constitutional system of checks and balances, the very thing that Adolf Hitler both opposed and passionately hated.

=== Funeral of Ludwig III ===
The funeral of Ludwig III on 5 November 1921 was feared or hoped to spark a restoration of the monarchy. Despite the abolition of the monarchy, the former King was laid to rest in front of the royal family, the Bavarian government, military personnel, and an estimated 100,000 spectators, in the style of royal funerals. Prince Rupprecht did not wish to use the occasion of the passing of his father to reestablish the monarchy by force, preferring to do so by legal means. Michael von Faulhaber, Archbishop of Munich, in his funeral speech, made a clear commitment to the monarchy while Rupprecht only declared that he had stepped into his birthright.

=== 1932–33 ===
In 1932, when it became ever more likely that the National Socialists under Adolf Hitler could take power in Bavaria and Germany, the restoration of the monarchy was seen as the only possible way to avoid this fate. Talks about a possible restoration were held as early as May 1932 between Baron Erwein von Aretin and Bavarian prime minister Heinrich Held.

The Bavarian conservative and labour parties supported such a move. Fritz Schäffer, leader of the Bavarian People's Party, planned to create the position of Generalstaatskommissar for the crown prince. Wilhelm Hoegner and Erhard Auer, leaders of the Social Democratic Party of Germany, supported the move. However, the Bavarian government under Heinrich Held hesitated to carry out such a step in February 1933, being discouraged to do so by the lack of support from the German President Paul von Hindenburg and the Reichswehr.

The restoration of the monarchy in 1933 would have required a change of the Bavarian constitution, at that point difficult to achieve. The office of Generalstaatskommissar was more feasible for Rupprecht, but did not appeal to the monarchists, who wanted a King. In any case, Heinrich Held's extensive political demands made the step impossible. Hitler warned Held, on 1 March, that a restoration would lead to a "terrible catastrophe". Von Hindenburg was only interested in a restoration of the House of Hohenzollern, not the King of Bavaria. All in all, the chances of restoration were slim in 1933 and slight after 1945.

In the March 1933 German federal election the Nazis' support in the three electoral parts of Bavaria ranged from 35 to 50%.

== Monarchism 1933–1945 ==
Despite some support from the Nazis for the monarchy prior to 1933, all monarchist organisations in the state were banned almost immediately in 1933 and their members prosecuted. Crown Prince Rupprecht survived the war in Italy, while other members of the royal family were arrested in 1944.

== Monarchism after 1945 ==
In 1945, a Bayerische Heimat- und Königspartei was formed. The US occupation authorities outlawed the party in 1946. Reformed in 1950, it never regained any momentum.

The Bayerischer Heimat- und Königsbund "In Treue fest" was also reformed after the Second World War. In 1967, upon the suggestion of Albrecht, Duke of Bavaria, it was renamed Bayernbund, to focus more on safeguarding the Bavarian identity rather than on restoring the monarchy.

Some hope was held that the monarchy could be reestablished after 1945, especially in the face of the monarchists' active participation in the German resistance. Attempts were made to establish the office of a President of Bavaria, but those remained unsuccessful. In a survey in 1954, 70 of 193 conservative members of the Bavarian parliament still declared themselves to be royalists. However, with the passage of time, a stronger emphasis has been set on supporting Bavaria's identity rather than on a restoration of the monarchy, a step encouraged by the former royal family.

Rupprecht died on 2 August 1955 and was succeeded by his son Albrecht as the head of the House of Wittelsbach. Albrecht adopted the title Duke of Bavaria and was himself succeeded upon his death in 1996 by his son Franz.

Franz Josef Strauss, the Minister-President of Bavaria from 1978 to 1988, was a strong supporter of the Bavarian monarchy.

The pretenders to the throne of Bavaria since the end of the monarchy in 1918 have been:

- Ludwig III of Bavaria (1845–1921), 1918–1921
- Rupprecht, Crown Prince of Bavaria (1869–1955), 1921–1955
- Albrecht, Duke of Bavaria (1905–96), 1955–1996
- Franz, Duke of Bavaria, (b. 1933), since 1996

== See also ==
- Politics of Bavaria
- Guglmänner
