= Trădătorii season 1 =

2025 Romanian television series season

Trădătorii
- Season 1
- Presented by: Ana Ularu
- No. of contestants: 24
- Winner: Ines Stana
- Runners-up: Marius Gadină; Daria Nica; Daniela Șendrea
- Location: Nádasdy Mansion, Nádasdladány, Central Transdanubia, Hungary
- No. of episodes: 12

Release
- Original network: Pro TV, Voyo
- Original release: October 30 – December 11, 2025

The first season of the Romanian television series Trădătorii, based on the Dutch series De Verraders, premiered on Pro TV on 30 October 2025.

The season was won by Ines Stana, as a Traitor, with Marius Gadină, Daria Nica and Daniela Șendrea, placing as runners-up, as Faithfuls.

The first season was hosted by Ana Ularu.

== Production ==
The first season was announced in September 2024. On 2 April 2025, Pro TV officially confirmed this news, with the applications being open immediately for civilian contestants. Any man or woman who had turned 18 was eligible to apply.

== Format ==
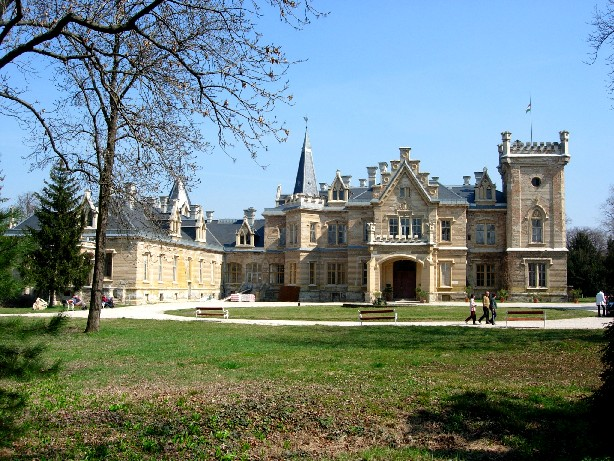
The first season was filmed at Nádasdy Mansion (pictured in 2006)

Twenty-four contestants arrive at a castle in the Central Transdanubia, Hungary with hopes of winning a large cash prize that is built up through missions. The players are referred to as the "Faithful" but among them are the "Traitors" – a group of contestants selected by the host, whose goal is to eliminate the Faithfuls and claim the prize for themselves. Should the Faithful contestants eliminate all the Traitors, they will share the prize fund, but if any Traitors make it to the end, they steal the money.

Most nights, the Traitors come together and decide upon one Faithful contestant to "murder" and that person leaves the game immediately. The remaining Faithful contestants do not know who has been eliminated until the following day when that person does not enter the castle for breakfast. The first murder takes place before the first banishment. After that the murders usually take place after the banishments. The group then takes part in a mission to add money to the prize fund. Some challenges also offer an opportunity for players to visit the Armory where one player is secretly awarded the shield which gives the player immunity from being murdered, but not from the banishment vote. An attempted murder on the shield holder will result in no player being eliminated.

At the end of each day, the players participate in the Round Table, where they discuss who to vote out before individually voting for a player to be banished. Players cast their votes privately then reveal their votes in turn to everyone. They may give a brief rationale for their vote. The person who received the most votes is eliminated and reveals their affiliation. When a Traitor is eliminated, the remaining Traitors are given the opportunity to recruit another player.

Once the game has reached the final four, the remaining players participate in the final challenge. The players are given a choice to "Banish Again" or to "End Game." A unanimous "End Game" vote concludes the game, while a single vote to "Banish Again" results in another banishment vote, followed by another choice between "Banish Again" or "End Game." When the game ends, if all remaining players are Faithful, then the prize money is divided evenly among them. However, if any Traitors remain, they win the entire pot.

== Contestants ==
All twenty-four contestants were revealed on 18 July through a promotional spot. However, their identities remained undisclosed. The first four contestants were officially announced on 8 September. Since then, until 13 October, four contestants have been introduced each week.

List of Trădătorii contestants
Contestant	Age	From	Occupation	Affiliation	Finish
Daniel Cojanu	30	Râmnicu Sărat, Buzău	Researcher	Faithful	Murdered (Episode 2)
Răzvan Balașov	34	Bucharest	Physics teacher and astrophysicist	Faithful	Banished (Episode 2)
Darius Grigorie	29	Uricani, Hunedoara	Comedian	Faithful	Murdered (Episode 3)
Gabi Bota	43	Orăștie, Hunedoara	Writer	Faithful	Banished (Episode 3)
Iulian Raicu	35	Constanța, Constanța	IT Project Manager	Faithful	Murdered (Episode 4)
Alexandra "Sasha" Popescu	37	Târgu Jiu, Gorj	Product manager	Faithful	Banished (Episode 4)
Radu Bănceanu	38	Hunedoara, Hunedoara	Magician	Traitor	Banished (Episode 5)
Diana Cibotea	33	Soveja, Vrancea	PR specialist	Faithful	Banished (Episode 6)
Sorina Bădărău	23	Iași, Iași	Law student	Faithful	Murdered (Episode 7)
Ionel Tămaș	26	Huedin, Cluj	Construction engineer	Traitor	Banished (Episode 7)
Constantin Dumitru	37	Bucharest	Hairstylist and motivational speaker	Faithful	Murdered (Episode 8)
Maria Secrieriu	37	Bucharest	Special education teacher	Faithful	Banished (Episode 8)
Alexa Vangu	27	Mangalia, Constanța	Composer	Traitor	Banished (Episode 9)
Ileana Berci	38	Cara, Cluj	Donkey farm owner	Faithful	Murdered (Episode 10)
Adina Gânscă	66	Cluj-Napoca, Cluj	Retired	Faithful	Banished (Episode 10)
Cosby Shillah	32	Bucharest	Security agent	Faithful	Murdered (Episode 11)
Ioan "Johnny" Bădeliță	43	Bucharest	Actor and beekeeper	Traitor (Note: Johnny was recruited as a Traitor in Episode 9.)	Banished (Episode 11)
Ilaria Mareș	42	Bucharest	Product control specialist	Faithful	Murdered (Episode 12)
Daniela "Dana" Matei	25	Bucharest	Artist	Faithful	Banished (Episode 12)
Andrei "Biju" Bijutescu	51	Bucharest	Digital marketing specialist	Faithful	Banished (Episode 12)
Daniela Șendrea	30	Chișinău, Moldova	Psycho-numerologist	Faithful	Runner-up (Episode 12)
Daria Nica	28	Straja, Hunedoara	Snowboard instructor	Faithful	Runner-up (Episode 12)
Marius Gadină	32	Satu Mare, Satu Mare	Police officer	Faithful	Runner-up (Episode 12)
Ines Stana	27	Baia Mare, Maramureș	Content creator	Traitor (Note: Ines was given an ultimatum to join the Traitors in Episode 7.)	Winner (Episode 12)

== Voting history ==
Key

The contestant was a Faithful.
The contestant was a Traitor.
The contestant was ineligible to vote.
The contestant was murdered by the traitors.
The contestant casting this vote was on Trial at this Round Table and were one of the only people subsequently eligible for being Murdered.
The contestant casting this vote won a Shield and was immune from being murdered, but was still eligible for Banishment.

Episode	1	2	3	4	5	6	7		8	9	10	11	12				
Shortlist	None	Cosby; Daniel; Daniela	Darius; Iulian; Johnny	Daniela; Iulian; Marius	Daniela; Ileana; Ines	None	Biju; Marius; Sorina		Constantin; Ileana; Johnny	None		Cosby; Daria; Marius	None	None			
Traitors' Decision	None	Daniel	Darius	Iulian	~~Daniela~~ (Note: At the end of episode 5, the Traitors decided to murder Daniela. However, Daniela had secretly won a shield during the previous mission and was spared from elimination.)	Ines (Note: The Traitors decided to offer Ines the opportunity to become a Traitor. She declined their offer. They couldn't murder a Faithful during the night.)	Sorina	Ines (Note: After Ionel was eliminated, Alexa, the only traitor left in the game, gave Ines an ultimatum to become a Traitor. If Ines refused, she would be automatically murdered. She accepted the offer this time. They could still murder a Faithful during the night.)	Constantin	Johnny (Note: The Traitors decided to offer Johnny the opportunity to become a Traitor. He accepted their offer. They couldn't murder a Faithful during the night.)	Ileana (Note: The Traitors were required to perform this murder in plain sight, during a dinner party. Ultimately, Ines was able to discreetly approach Ileana and murder her by telling her a predetermined sentence and giving her a hug, while avoiding suspicion.)	Cosby	Ilaria	None			
Traitors' Decision	None	Murder				Recruit	Murder	Ultimatum	Murder	Recruit	Murder			None			
Banishment	Constantin, Ileana (Note: The contestants were asked to line themselves up in a row, from those that judged themselves most naïve to most perceptive. Ana Ularu asked the contestant who nominated themselves the most perceptive to choose another contestant they thought was most deceitful, who could then select two contestants they wanted to eliminate from the game. Their picks then had to leave the castle immediately.)	Răzvan	Gabi	Sasha	Radu	Diana	Ionel		Maria	Alexa	Adina	Johnny	Tie (Note: The first round of voting resulted in a tie. Per the rules, a second vote was held where the players involved in the tie would not vote and the remaining players could only vote for those who tied.)	Tie (Note: The second round of voting resulted in a tie. Per the rules, a third vote was held where the players involved in the tie would not vote and the remaining players could only vote for those who tied.)	Tie (Note: Due to a deadlocked tie after three rounds of voting and the non-tied contestants being unable to come up with a unanimous decision to vote out either Biju or Ines, the two became immune, and all the contestants had to re-vote between the four non-immune players: Dana, Daniela, Daria, and Marius.)	Dana	Biju
Vote	None	7–5–3–1– 1–1–1–1–1	8–4–2–1– 1–1–1–1	4–3–3–2–2– 2–1–1–1	12–6	14–1–1	6–4–4–1		7–2–2– 1–1	10–2	4–2–2–1–1	7–1	3–3	2–2	2–2	3–2–1	3–1–1
Ines	No vote	Ionel	Gabi	Radu	Radu	Diana	Ionel		Cosby	Alexa	Dana	Johnny	Biju	No vote	No vote	Dana	Biju
Marius	No vote	Răzvan	Ionel	Radu	Radu	Diana	Biju		Johnny	Alexa	Dana	Johnny	Biju	Biju	Biju	Dana	Biju
Daria	No vote	Ionel	Gabi	Sasha	Daniela	Diana	Ines		Maria	Alexa	Johnny	Johnny	Ines	Ines	Ines	Marius	Ines
Daniela	No vote	Ionel	Ionel	Ionel	Radu	Diana	Ionel		Alexa	Alexa	Adina	Johnny	Biju	Biju	Biju	Dana	Biju
Biju	No vote	Răzvan	Gabi	Maria	Daniela	Cosby	Ionel		Maria	Alexa	Adina	Johnny	Ines	No vote	No vote	Marius	Daniela
Dana	No vote	Gabi	Gabi	Daniela	Radu	Diana	Ines		Maria	Alexa	Biju	Johnny	Ines	Ines	Ines	Daniela	Banished (Episode 12)
Ilaria	No vote	Gabi	Gabi	Sasha	Daniela	Diana	Ines		Johnny	Alexa	Johnny	Johnny	Murdered (Episode 12)				
Johnny	No vote	Răzvan	Biju	Daniela	Radu	Diana	Cosby		Cosby	Alexa	Adina	Biju	Banished (Episode 11)				
Cosby	No vote	Sorina	Sorina	Johnny	Daniela	Diana	Biju		Maria	Alexa	Adina	Murdered (Episode 11)					
Adina	No vote	Răzvan	Alexa	Ionel	Radu	Diana	Ines		Maria	Daria	Ilaria	Banished (Episode 10)					
Ileana	No vote (Note: After being nominated by the "most perceptive" contestant as the most deceitful, Maria gained the power to choose any two contestants she wished to be Fake Eliminated.)	Eliminated (Episode 1)	No vote (Note: Constantin and Ileana returned to the game at the end of the daily mission. Upon their reintroduction, they could not be voted for or murdered that night. They were also not allowed to vote at the Round Table that night.)	Ionel	Radu	Diana	Ionel		Maria	Alexa	Murdered (Episode 10)						
Alexa	No vote	Gabi	Gabi	Cosby	Radu	Diana	Biju		Maria	Daria	Banished (Episode 9)						
Maria	Constantin, Ileana	Răzvan	Ionel	Sasha	Radu	Diana	Ionel		Biju	Banished (Episode 8)							
Constantin	No vote	Eliminated (Episode 1)	No vote	Cosby	Radu	Diana	Ionel		Murdered (Episode 8)								
Ionel	No vote	Răzvan	Daniela	Biju	Radu	Biju	Biju		Banished (Episode 7)								
Sorina	No vote	Gabi	Gabi	Ines	Radu	Diana	Murdered (Episode 7)										
Diana	No vote	Daniela	Ionel	Daniela	Daniela	Daniela	Banished (Episode 6)										
Radu	No vote	Sasha	Sasha	Sasha	Daniela	Banished (Episode 5)											
Sasha	No vote	Cosby	Ilaria	Maria	Banished (Episode 4)												
Iulian	No vote	Gabi	Gabi	Murdered (Episode 4)													
Gabi	No vote	Răzvan	Ilaria	Banished (Episode 3)													
Darius	No vote	Biju	Murdered (Episode 3)														
Răzvan	No vote	Marius	Banished (Episode 2)														
Daniel	No vote	Murdered (Episode 2)															

==== End game ====
Episode	12	
Decision	End Game	Game Over; Traitor Win
Vote	4–0	Game Over; Traitor Win
Ines	End Game	Winner
Marius	End Game	Runners-up
Daria	End Game	Runners-up
Daniela	End Game	Runners-up

== Missions ==
Episode	Task description	Time limit	Money earned	Money available	Running total	Shield winner
1	The contestants were divided into three teams and attended the funeral of a very wealthy man. Each team sent one member at a time to the confessional. That person received a page and paragraph reference to a riddle in the Book of Secrets, whose answer could be found inside the church, among the mourners. If they answered the riddle correctly, they would receive a gold bar. Each gold bar was worth €500. A perfect game could earn them €5,000 per team, meaning a total of €15,000 added to the final prize.	15 minutes each	€12,500	€15,000	€12,500 (of €15,000)	No Shield on offer
2	The contestants were offered a boat and were instructed to recover four pieces of rope located on wooden rafts scattered across the nearby lake, which had to be visited in order. Gold bars worth a total of €12,000 could also be found on the rafts; the fifth and last raft carried the largest amount of gold, but no rope. The group had to abandon one member per acquired item. At the end, the remaining contestants were required to row back to shore in time and use the ropes to start a small fire; each of these contestants received one Shield that would protect them from being murdered that evening.	20 minutes	€6,000	€12,000	€18,500 (of €27,000)	Adina
2		20 minutes	€6,000	€12,000	€18,500 (of €27,000)	Alexa
2		20 minutes	€6,000	€12,000	€18,500 (of €27,000)	Biju
2		20 minutes	€6,000	€12,000	€18,500 (of €27,000)	Cosby
2		20 minutes	€6,000	€12,000	€18,500 (of €27,000)	Dana
2		20 minutes	€6,000	€12,000	€18,500 (of €27,000)	Daria
2		20 minutes	€6,000	€12,000	€18,500 (of €27,000)	Diana
2		20 minutes	€6,000	€12,000	€18,500 (of €27,000)	Gabi
2		20 minutes	€6,000	€12,000	€18,500 (of €27,000)	Ines
2		20 minutes	€6,000	€12,000	€18,500 (of €27,000)	Ionel
2		20 minutes	€6,000	€12,000	€18,500 (of €27,000)	Marius
2		20 minutes	€6,000	€12,000	€18,500 (of €27,000)	Răzvan
3	The contestants were divided into three teams, each designating a volunteer who had to hide in an unusual place — a set of specially prepared graves in the forest. The mission of the remaining team members was to find their hidden volunteers within a 20-minute time limit, using maps provided at the beginning of the challenge, as well as additional clues provided via radio by the volunteers at each checkpoint. For each teammate found, the team received €3,000, which was added to the final reward of the challenge.	20 minutes	€9,000	€9,000	€27,500 (of €36,000)	Ionel (Note: After Constantin and Ileana were freed by the other players and rejoined the game, each of them had to gift a Shield to another contestant of their choice. Constantin chose Ionel, while Ileana chose Gabi.)
3		20 minutes	€9,000	€9,000	€27,500 (of €36,000)	Gabi
4	The contestants were chained and placed in a circle around an altar. Taking turns, each player had to answer their assigned question truthfully, then approach the altar and unlock themselves using a code on the back of a voodoo doll bearing their name. Once freed, the contestant would have to leave the circle and choose whether to give an extra minute to the other contestants or take a Shield for themselves. For each contestant who managed to free themselves, €500 was added to the final prize.	8 minutes initially	€9,500	€9,500	€37,000 (of €45,500)	Daniela
4	The contestants were chained and placed in a circle around an altar. Taking turns, each player had to answer their assigned question truthfully, then approach the altar and unlock themselves using a code on the back of a voodoo doll bearing their name. Once freed, the contestant would have to leave the circle and choose whether to give an extra minute to the other contestants or take a Shield for themselves. For each contestant who managed to free themselves, €500 was added to the final prize.	8 minutes initially	€9,500	€9,500	€37,000 (of €45,500)	Diana
4	The contestants were chained and placed in a circle around an altar. Taking turns, each player had to answer their assigned question truthfully, then approach the altar and unlock themselves using a code on the back of a voodoo doll bearing their name. Once freed, the contestant would have to leave the circle and choose whether to give an extra minute to the other contestants or take a Shield for themselves. For each contestant who managed to free themselves, €500 was added to the final prize.	8 minutes initially	€9,500	€9,500	€37,000 (of €45,500)	Ines
4	The contestants were chained and placed in a circle around an altar. Taking turns, each player had to answer their assigned question truthfully, then approach the altar and unlock themselves using a code on the back of a voodoo doll bearing their name. Once freed, the contestant would have to leave the circle and choose whether to give an extra minute to the other contestants or take a Shield for themselves. For each contestant who managed to free themselves, €500 was added to the final prize.	8 minutes initially	€9,500	€9,500	€37,000 (of €45,500)	Sasha
5	Birdwatching Challenge. In this challenge, the contestants were divided into two groups. Six of them competed outdoors, with the rest remaining in the castle. The six outdoor participants were divided into three teams of two, each team assigned a unique route through the castle grounds. The routes included multiple birdwatching points, which had to be identified using maps. Along each route, one checkpoint had a Shield hidden nearby, which the contestants could claim for themselves. At each observation point, the contestants heard a unique bird trill, which they had to memorize and imitate over radio. The participants remaining in the castle were then given two tries to identify the bird corresponding to the sound being imitated. For each correctly identified bird, €1,000 was added to the team's final prize.	30 minutes	€4,000	€9,000	€41,000 (of €54,500)	Daniela
6	The Animals and Gold Challenge. In this mission, the Traitors were given a list of four animals which they had to match to four contestants based on their characteristics. They chose Daria as the Sheep, Daniela as the Snake, Alexa as the Hen, and Ionel as the Wolf. The four chosen participants were then tasked with selecting four other players to take part in a mission. The four selected for this mission were Biju, Sorina, Johnny, and Marius, who were subsequently trapped in individual cages. The other contestants had to find as many gold bars as possible and place them on their own log, carrying only one bar at a time. The collected gold bars could then be used to bid for the release of one of the prisoners, with the bid amount being deducted from the final prize. The released prisoner received a Shield and a personal €2,000 bonus, while the other three became the only possible targets for the murder later that evening.	15 minutes	€6,500 (Note: The initial amount won by the contestants was €13,500. During the auction, the contestants spent €7,000, leaving them with only €6,500 as the total prize.)	€15,000	€47,500 (of €69,500)	Johnny
7	The Judgement of the Liars. The contestants had to distinguish lies from truth and the guilty from the innocent. Five players were chosen to form an incorruptible jury. The rest of the contestants were called "the accused". Each accused player would take turns approaching a box filled with more or less familiar objects, which they had to describe in great detail, without naming them, within a 15-second time limit. For some, the box would be empty, in which case they had to describe an imaginary object. If the jury believed them, they would receive an individual Shield. If the jury realized they were lying, €1,000 would be added to the final prize. If the jury accused an honest player, then €500 would be deducted from the final prize.	—N/a	~~€9,000~~ (Note: Because Cosby was the only contestant not chosen at the Ceremony of Trust later that day, he had the chance to receive two Shields — one for himself and one for a person of his choice — or the chance to take €9,000 from the final prize, money earned in this mission. Cosby chose the €9,000, which was added to his personal account once he was eliminated.)	€10,000	€47,500 (of €79,500)	Daria
7		—N/a	~~€9,000~~	€10,000	€47,500 (of €79,500)	Alexa
8	Gossip. The challenge involves an exercise in introspection and interpersonal perception, in which each contestant takes turns descending into a specially arranged room. There, they find several tarot cards, each associated with a specific human trait. The contestant freely chooses one card and assigns the trait it represents to one of their fellow competitors. Meanwhile, the contestants remaining upstairs receive three possible trait options and must guess which trait the contestant in the room selected, based on the face of the colleague to whom the trait was assigned, displayed on the screen. If the group correctly identifies the chosen trait, the contestant in the room is rewarded with a shield or €500 added to their final prize. The challenge tests observation skills, empathy, and the way contestants perceive one another.	—N/a	€1,500	€6,500	€49,000 (of €86,000)	Biju
8		—N/a	€1,500	€6,500	€49,000 (of €86,000)	Ileana
8		—N/a	€1,500	€6,500	€49,000 (of €86,000)	Marius
9	Barrels of Kindness. The challenge requires contestants to collect all the barrels scattered throughout the castle courtyard. Each barrel has a monetary value written on it, and contestants are rewarded with the total amount of money from the barrels they bring back, as well as an evening party. Among the regular barrels are three special barrels, each containing a shield. If these barrels are recovered, the contestants must jointly decide which players will receive the shields. For the barrels to be counted and validated, all contestants must return to the final checkpoint. If one or more contestants fail to return in time, none of the barrels are taken into account, and the challenge is considered invalid.	45 minutes	€15,000	€15,000	€64,900 (Note: An extra €900 was added to the final prize from this point onward; the reasoning for this is unclear.) (of €101,900)	Adina
9		45 minutes	€15,000	€15,000	€64,900 (of €101,900)	Ilaria
9		45 minutes	€15,000	€15,000	€64,900 (of €101,900)	Marius
10	Emotion Control. In this challenge, five teams of two participants enter an isolated building one pair at a time. Inside, contestants are exposed to various stress factors, such as being tickled, distracted by sudden noises, breathed upon, or made to listen to audio of previously eliminated players reprimanding them, creating a psychologically tense environment. The task requires each team to mentally track a duration of 13 minutes and 13 seconds without the aid of timing devices. When they believe the interval has elapsed, they signal completion by pulling a rope. Scoring is based on accuracy relative to the actual time: teams that finish right on time earn €5,000, those within 30 seconds earn €2,000, those within one minute earn €1,000, those within two minutes earn €500, and no reward is granted beyond that margin. The team with the smallest deviation from the correct time receives two protective Shields, offering an advantage in subsequent stages of the competition.	—N/a	€3,500	€25,000	€68,400 (of €126,900)	Daniela
10		—N/a	€3,500	€25,000	€68,400 (of €126,900)	Ines
10	The Litter-Bearing Challenge. This is a cooperative task in which contestants are provided with a ceremonial litter designed for a "delicate princess," along with four bearers assigned to carry it. The objective is to complete 24 laps around a large flowerbed within a 20-minute time limit. Successful completion of the required laps awards the team €5,000. During the task, bearers are allowed to request replacements if they become fatigued, ensuring that the pace can be maintained throughout the challenge. A key rule specifies that the litter must never touch the ground at any point during the 24 laps; any contact with the ground results in failure to meet the challenge conditions.	20 minutes	€5,000	€5,000	€73,400 (of €131,900)	No Shield on offer
11	The "Billiard Room Mystery" Challenge. This is an investigative task built around the staged "murder" of Cosby, whose body is found in the billiard room marked with chalk. The supposed perpetrators have left visual clues that contestants must decipher. The participants are divided into four teams of two players, each pair entering the room in turn. Each duo is given three minutes to observe all details without touching anything. Afterwards, they have five minutes to discuss and agree on what they noticed. The team then re-enters the billiard room, where seven details have been altered in position or appearance. For every correctly identified difference, the contestants earn €200.	—N/a	€3,800	€5,600	€77,200 (of €137,500)	No Shield on offer
11	The "Empathy Game" Challenge is designed to assess contestants' attention, observational skills, and how well they have come to understand one another. The challenge uses eight double-sided frames, each displaying a contestant on one side and an action associated with that person on the other. Taking turns, contestants must mime—within one minute—the character shown in the frame, representing one of their fellow players. The team earns €200 for correctly identifying the person being portrayed. If they also guess the associated action, they receive an additional €100 bonus.	—N/a	€2,000	€2,400	€79,200 (of €139,900)	No Shield on offer
12	The players are split into three teams of two. The teams take turns participating in the challenge, with one volunteer from each team embarking on a biplane for a wild ride, while their assistant teammate communicates with them from the ground over radio. After takeoff, the assistant is provided with eleven cards containing Romanian words. After picking a card, they must communicate the definition of the word to the volunteer, whose task is to guess the word in question. Each team needs to decipher as many words as possible within a three-minute window, with each correct guess adding €300 to the final prize. An additional €1,000 bonus is added for each participating team.	3 minutes each	€4,800	€12,900	€84,000 (of €152,800)	No Shield on offer

== Episodes ==
No. overall	No. in series	Title	Original release date	RO viewers (millions)
1	1	"Episode 1"	30 October 2025	0.66
2	2	"Episode 2"	5 November 2025	N/A
3	3	"Episode 3"	6 November 2025	0.42
4	4	"Episode 4"	12 November 2025	N/A
5	5	"Episode 5"	13 November 2025	N/A
6	6	"Episode 6"	19 November 2025	N/A
7	7	"Episode 7"	20 November 2025	N/A
8	8	"Episode 8"	26 November 2025	N/A
9	9	"Episode 9"	27 November 2025	N/A
10	10	"Episode 10"	3 December 2025	N/A
11	11	"Episode 11"	4 December 2025	N/A
12	12	"Episode 12"	11 December 2025	0.56

== Ratings ==
Episode	Original airdate	Timeslot (EET)	National				Commercial (21–54 Urban ABCD)			Source
Episode	Original airdate	Timeslot (EET)	Rank	Viewers (in thousands)	Rating (%)	Share (%)	Rank	Rating (%)	Share (%)	Source
1	October 30, 2025	Thursday, 21:30	#3	662	—	—	#1	5.1	19.0	
2	November 5, 2025	Wednesday, 21:30								
3	November 6, 2025	Thursday, 21:30								
4	November 12, 2025	Wednesday, 21:30								
5	November 13, 2025	Thursday, 21:30								
6	November 19, 2025	Wednesday, 21:30								
7	November 20, 2025	Thursday, 21:30								
8	November 26, 2025	Wednesday, 21:30								
9	November 27, 2025	Thursday, 21:30								
10	December 3, 2025	Wednesday, 21:30								
11	December 4, 2025	Thursday, 21:30								
12	December 11, 2025	Thursday, 20:30	#4	565	3.2	8.0	#2	5.0	15.0	
