= Nádasdy family =

Hungarian aristocratic family

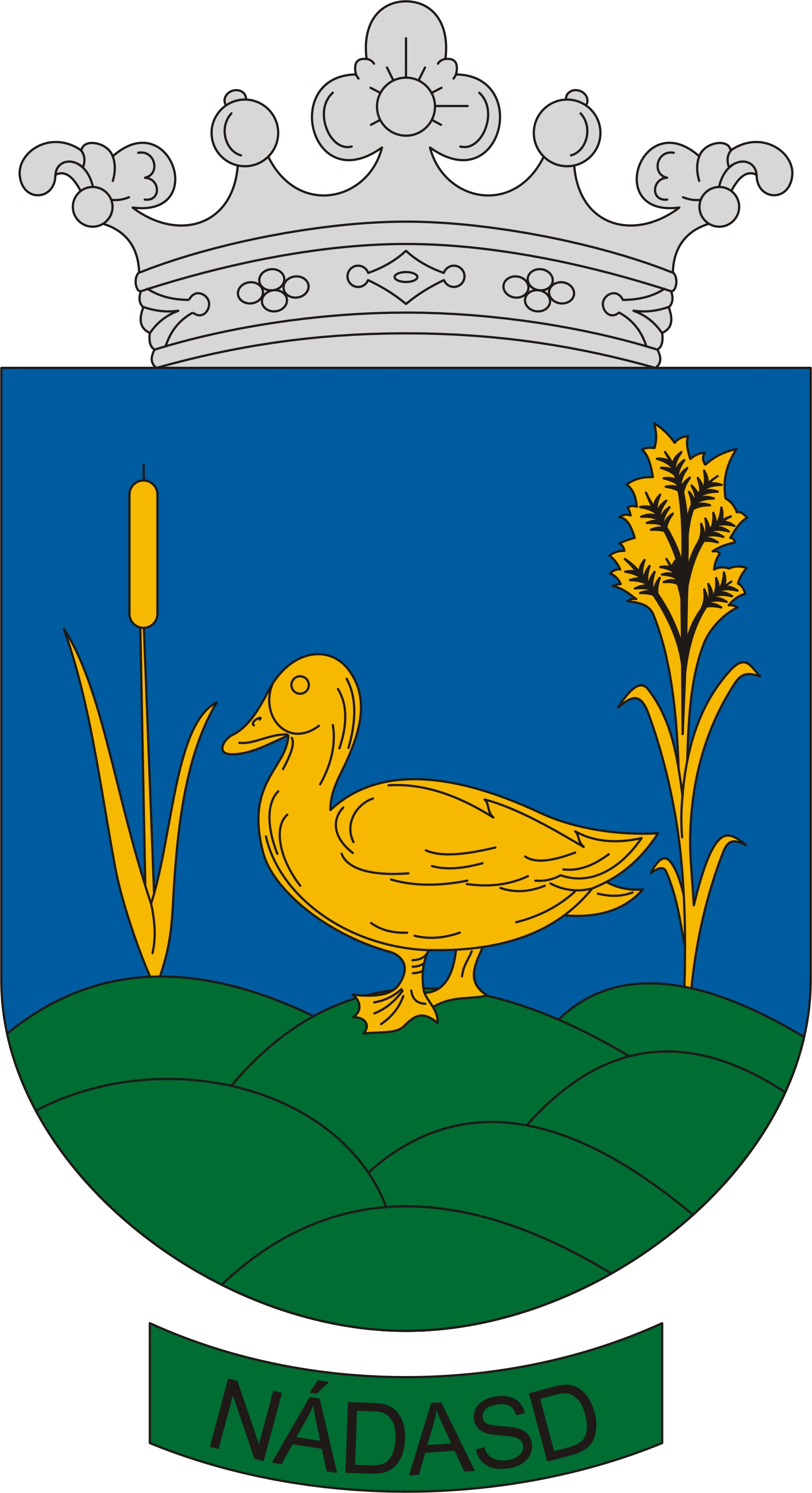
Coat of arms of the Nádasdy family

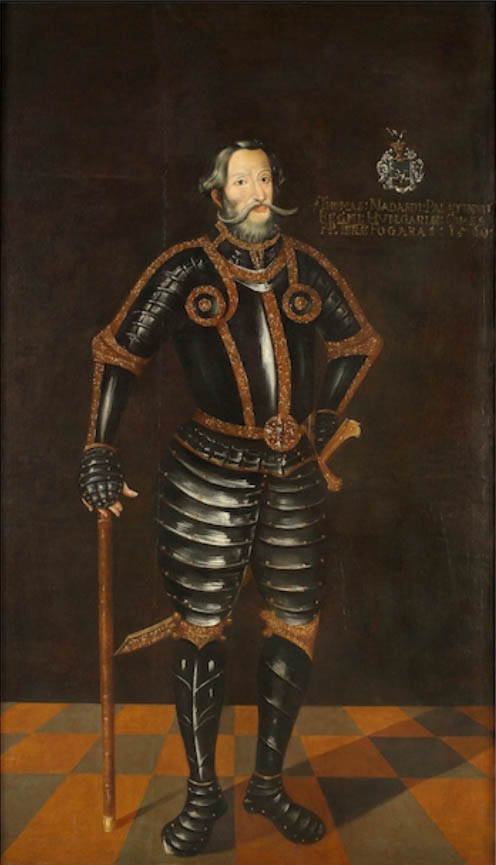
Tamás I Nádasdy (1498–1562)

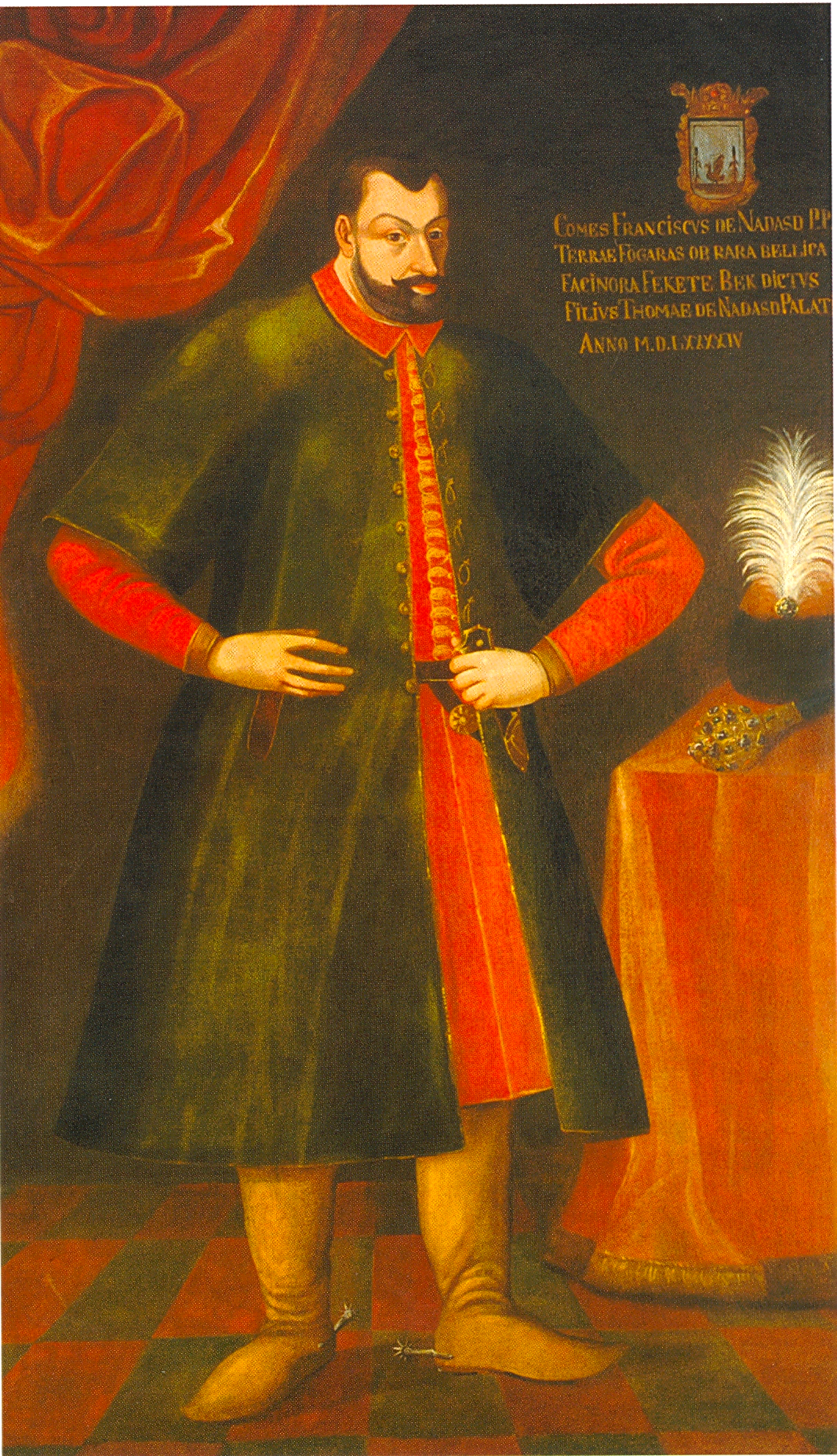
Ferenc Nádasdy II (1555–1604)

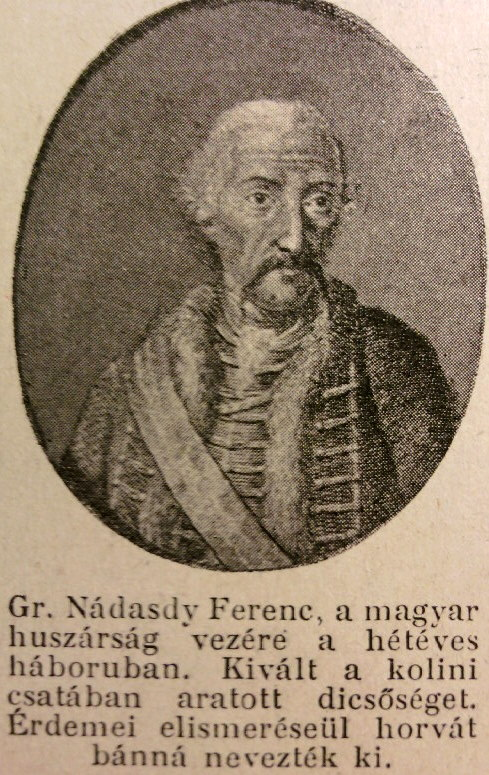
Ferenc Nádasdy (1708–1783)

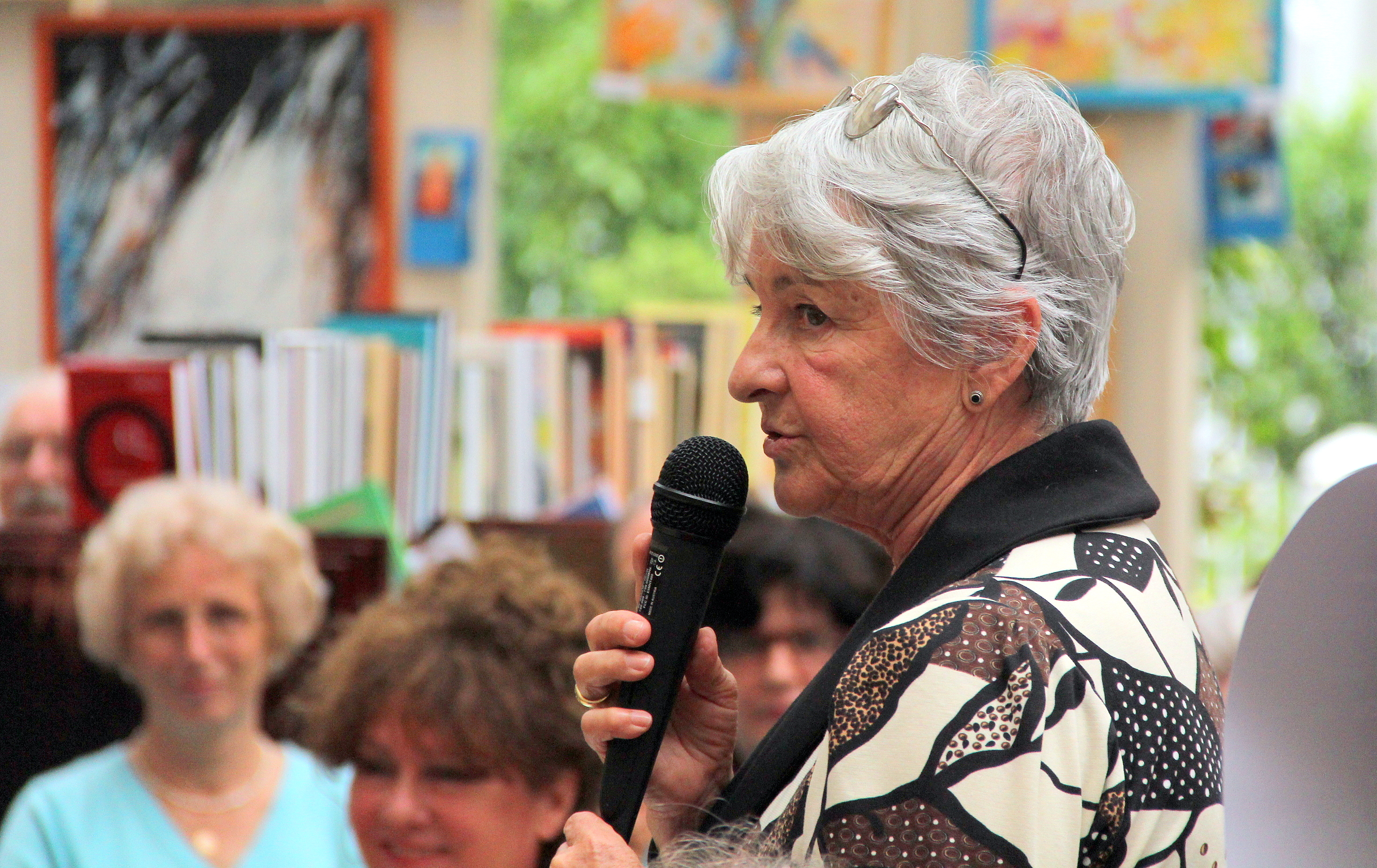
Borbála Nádasdy (1939-)

The House of Nádasdy, also spelled Nadasdy in English, is a major Hungarian aristocratic family whose roots reach into the Middle Ages. The house motto is, "Si Deus pro nobis quis contra nos," ("If God is for us, who can be against us?"). The Nadasdy family made a large contribution to the development of Hungarian printing. The Nadasdy Hussars, a regiment named after the family, developed a strategy incorporating lightly armed and fast-moving cavalry that was internationally adopted.

== Early history ==
The name is first encountered in the early part of the 13th century, that of Imre (descendant of Darabos de Nádasd) and his sons, Stefánd, Tódor, and Valkomer. Another important member, deceased before 1275, was Simon Nádasdy. Frequently mentioned in family records between 1324 and 1376 is Pető Gersei, who was married to Margit Hidvégi, is considered the progenitor of the family "Pethő de Gerse". In 1229, Petan sold most of his land to a member of the family Nádasdy. The buyer and his three sons, Vencel/Venceslav, Raszló/Vraslav and László/Ladislav, now partially used the predicate of Pethenegh. Laszlo Nádasdy of Pethenegh (c. 1236) is the progenitor of main line Nádasdy.

== Notable family members ==
- Baron Tamás I Nádasdy (1498–1562), was Palatine of Hungary and the Ban of Croatia.
- Ferenc Nádasdy II (1555–1604) called the "Black Captain", a general and the son of Tamás I Nádasdy
- Elizabeth Nádasdy (1560–1614), wife of Count Ferenc Nádasdy and an alleged serial killer
- Franz III. Nádasdy (1622–1671), grandson of Ferenc Nádasdy II, was a Judge royal, high steward (Hofrichter) of Hungary, and imperial privy councillor, executed in Magnate conspiracy; he created one of the most notable libraries and private art collections in central Europe.
- Franz Leopold von Nádasdy (1708–1783), was an Austrian field marshal, and Ban of Croatia.
- Ferenc Nádasdy (cultural preservationist) (1937–2013), the last direct male member of the family.
- Borbála Nádasdy (1939–present) is a ballet master and author who currently lives in France.

== Holdings ==
Of its many holdings, the family held the Nádasdy Castle in Sárvár, Hungary, the Csejte Castle, in Čachtice, Slovakia which is situated on a hill adjacent to a nature reserve, and the Nádasdy Castle in Nádasdladány, Hungary.

== Family members ==
Name & Last name	Age	Origin	Périod	Status
Ferenc Nádasdy de Nádasd et Fogarasföld	71	Hungary	1470–1541	Baron and Count
Orsolya Véssey		Hungary		Married to Ferenc Nádasdy
Tamás Nádasdy de Nádasd et Fogarasföld	64	Hungary	1498–1562	Baron and Ban of Croatia, főispán, Palatine of Hungary
Orsolya Kanizsai		Hungary		Married to Tamás Nádasdy
František, Ferenc II Nádasdy de Nádasd	49	Hungary	1555–1604	Count, general, the son of Tamás I Nádasdy.
Countess Erzsébet (Née Báthory)	54	Hungary	1560–1614	Married to František, Ferenc II Nádasdy de Nádasd
Pavol, Pal Nádasdy	57	Hungary	1593–1650	Father and son of Hungarian nobles
Judith Nádasdy (Née Revay)	53	Hungary	1590–1643	Married to à Pavol/Pal Nádasdy
Francis, Ferenc Nádasdy III Nadásdi	48	Austria	1623–1671	Count, Judge Royal of the Kingdom, a great patron of and opponent to the Habsburgs.
Anna Julia Nádasdy (Née Esterhazy)		Austria		Married to Ferenc Nádasdy III, mother of many children.
Pál Nádasdy			1650 – ????	Son of Hungarian nobles
Jan Nadásdy				Son of Pál Nádasdy
Joseph Nadásdy	50	Hungary	1717–1767	Great-grandson of Francis, Ferenc Nádasdy III Nadásdi
Támas Nadásdy (2)				Descendant of the family Nádasdy
Anna Nádasdy (Née Nádasdy?)		Hungary	1792 – ???	Her child bears her surname and not that of the father
Comte Lipót Nádasdy	72	Hungary	1801–1873	Significant Count Hungary
Francis Nadásdy (1)	50	Hungary	1864–1914	Great-grandson of Támas Nasdy (2)
Lajos Nadási	58	Hungary	1887–1945	Great-grandson of Lipót Nádasdy Count
Francis Nadásdy ²	40	Poland	1889–1929	
Kálmán Nádasdy	76	Hungary	1904–1980	Descendant of Ferenc Nádasdy. Was also 4th cousin thrice removed from Francis Nádasdy ²
Pál Nádasi	64	Hungary	1910–1974	Great-grandson of Count Lipót Nádasdy
Lajos Nádasdy ²	101	Hungary	1913–2014	
Jan Nádasi (2)	80	France	1918–1998	Left Hungary at the age of 4 and immigrated to France. Was the son of Francis Nádasdy ²
Logan Nádasi	23	Montana	2003-Present	Son of George Nádasi junior, and nephew of Ferenc Nádasdy the 5th. More information is not available.
Borbála Nádasdy		Hungary – France	1939 –	Countess Nádasdy, has lived in Austria, in Hungary and in France
Henri Vajda-Nádasi	68	France	1946–2014	He bear the surnames of both parents
Ádám Nádasdy	79	Hungary	1947–2026	Linguist and poet, son of Kálmán Nádasdy
Jean Vajda-Nádasdy	40	France	1974–2014	Father of Nina, Clara, Laure Déborah Vajda-Nádasdy and other..
Siblings Nádasdy		Hungary		Children of the current countess and direct descendants of Ferenc Nádasdy
Anikó Nádasdy-Nagyné Bálint		Hungary	1985 –	Worked at Budapest Gyógyfürdői
Zoli Nádasdy		Hungary		Married to Éva Nádasdy-Erdélyi and descendant of Ferenc Nádasdy
Éva Nádasdy-Erdélyi		Hungary		Married to Zoli Nádasdy and assistant in primary education
Héléna Nádasdy		Brazil		Descendant to Ferenc Nádasdy
Ludovicus J Nádasdy		United States		Affiliation to the family is unproven
Tamás Nádasdy		Roumania		Student in pharmacy and medicine
Úrsula Nádasdy		Spain	1995 –	Biochemistry student and descendant of Ferenc Nádasdy
Amanda Nádasdy		Slovakia		Student and descendant of Ferenc Nádasdy
Ángela Pino Nádasdy		Chile	1995 –	Student in graphic design and descendant of Ferenc Nádasdy
Siblings Vajda-Nádasdy		France		Descendant 17 generations from Ferenc Nádasdy
Richard Nádasdy		Hungary	1996 –	Descendant of Ferenc Nádasdy and an agricultural student
Balázs Nádasdy		Hungary		Student and descendant Ferenc Nádasdy
Katalin Nadasdy		Mexico		Descendant 17 generations from Ferenc Nádasdy
Bárthory Nádasdy		Germany	1999 –	High school student and descendant of Ferenc Nádasdy
Siblings Nádasdy		Hungary		Grandchildren of the current countess and direct descendants of Ferenc Nádasdy
Matyi Nádasdy-Nagyné		Hungary	2014 –	Daughter Aniko Nádasdy – Nagyné and descendant of Ferenc Nádasdy
Katalin Nadasdy-Ban - descendant from Kalman Nadasdy-Ban Grandchildren are Zold, Beke, Balazs } Family members who have always or can claim a title of nobility

== See also ==
- List of titled noble families in the Kingdom of Hungary
