= Ludwig III of Bavaria =

King of Bavaria from 1913 to 1918

Ludwig III
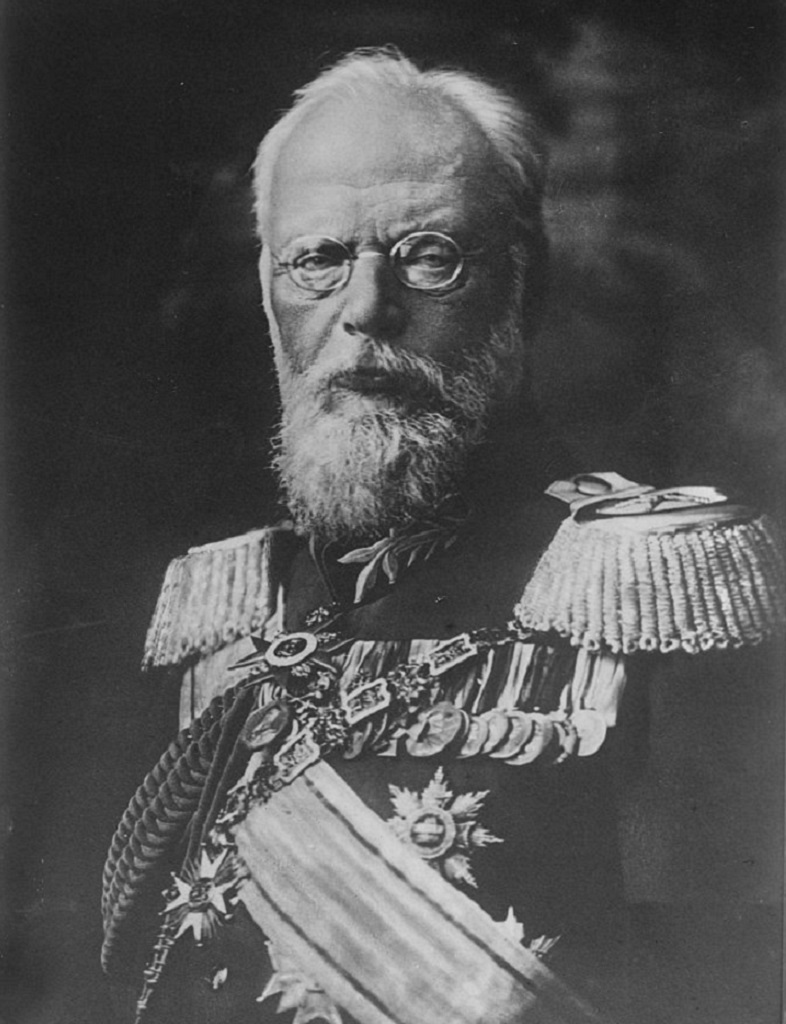
- Ludwig, circa 1915–1920

King of Bavaria
- Reign: 5 November 1913 – 13 November 1918
- Predecessor: Otto
- Successor: Monarchy abolished
- Prime Ministers: See list: Georg von Hertling Otto von Dandl

Prince Regent of Bavaria
- Regency: 12 December 1912 – 5 November 1913
- Predecessor: Luitpold
- Monarch: Otto
- Born: 7 January 1845; Munich, Kingdom of Bavaria, German Confederation
- Died: 17 October 1921 (aged 76); Sárvár, Kingdom of Hungary
- Burial: Munich Frauenkirche
- Spouse: Maria Theresa of Austria-Este (m. 1868; died 1919)
- Issue More: Rupprecht, Crown Prince of Bavaria; Adelgunde, Princess of Hohenzollern; Princess Maria, Duchess of Calabria; Prince Karl; Prince Franz; Mathilde, Princess Ludwig of Saxe-Coburg and Gotha; Prince Wolfgang; Princess Hildegarde; Princess Notburga; Wiltrud, Duchess of Urach; Princess Helmtrud; Princess Dietlinde; Gundelinde, Countess of Preysing-Lichtenegg-Moos
- House: Wittelsbach
- Father: Luitpold, Prince Regent of Bavaria
- Mother: Archduchess Auguste Ferdinande of Austria
- Religion: Roman Catholic

Ludwig III (Ludwig Luitpold Josef Maria Aloys Alfred; 7 January 1845 – 17 October 1921) was the last King of Bavaria, reigning from 1913 to 1918. Initially, he served in the Bavarian military as a lieutenant and went on to hold the rank of Oberleutnant during the Austro-Prussian War. He entered politics at the age of 18, as a member of the Bavarian parliament, and was a keen participant, supporting electoral reforms. Later in life, he served as regent and de facto head of state from 1912 to 1913, ruling for his incapacitated cousin, Otto. After the Bavarian parliament passed a law allowing him to do so, Ludwig deposed Otto and assumed the throne for himself. He led Bavaria during World War I. His short reign was seen as championing conservative causes and he was influenced by the Catholic encyclical Rerum novarum.

After the German Revolution of 1918–1919, the German Empire was dissolved and the Weimar Republic was created. As a result of this revolution, the Bavarian throne was abolished along with the other monarchies of the German states, ending the House of Wittelsbach's 738-year reign over Bavaria. Fearing that he might be a victim of an assassination, Ludwig fled to Hungary, Liechtenstein and then Switzerland. He returned to Bavaria in 1920 and lived at Wildenwart Castle. He died shortly after, when he was staying at Nádasdy Mansion in Sárvár.

== Early life ==
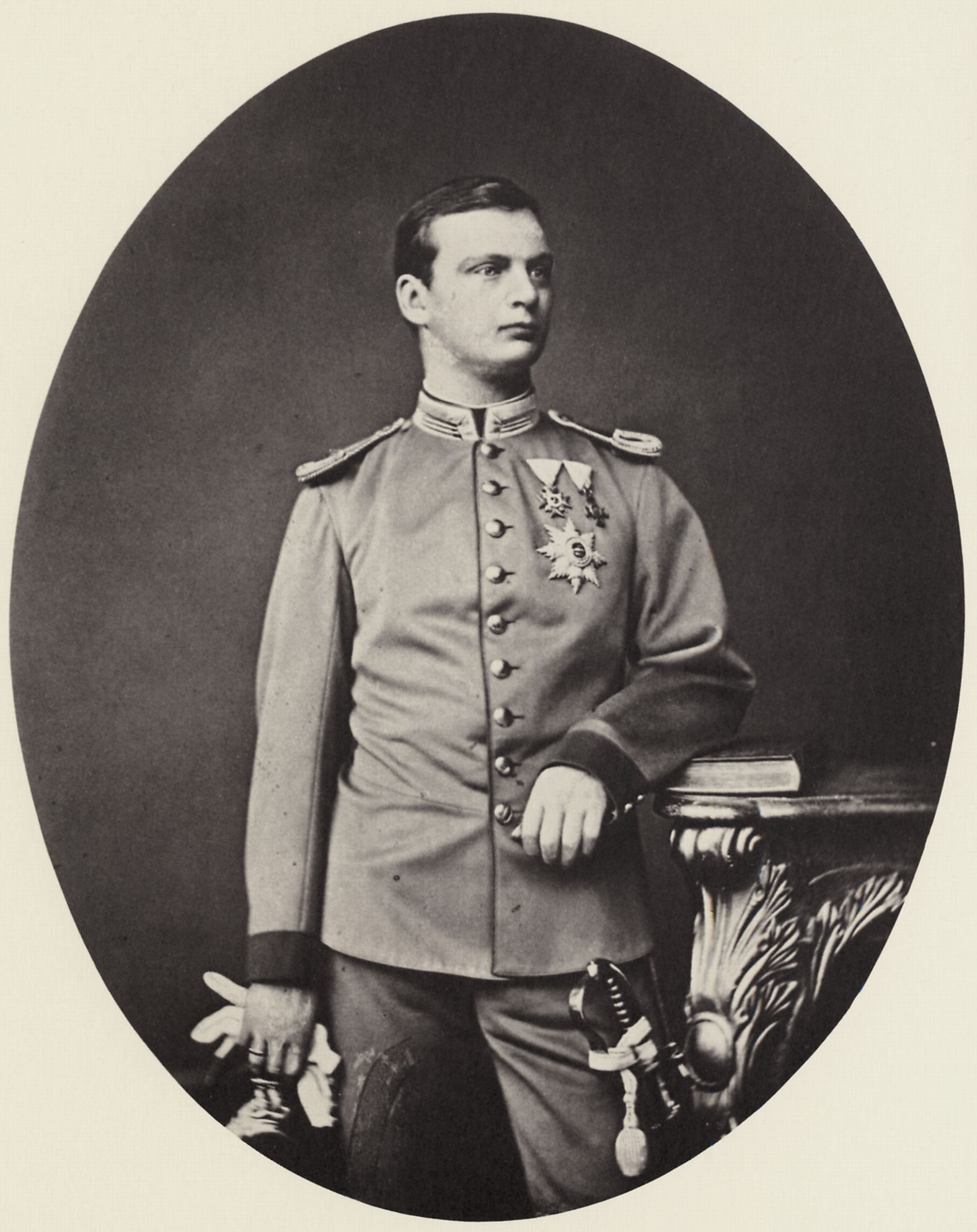
Ludwig III of Bavaria, 1868

Ludwig was born in Munich, the eldest son of Luitpold, Prince Regent of Bavaria and of his wife, Archduchess Auguste Ferdinande of Austria (daughter of Leopold II, Grand Duke of Tuscany). He was a descendant of both Louis XIV of France and William the Conqueror.

Ludwig spent his first years living in the Electoral rooms of the Munich Residenz and in the Wittelsbacher Palais. From 1852 to 1863, he was tutored by Ferdinand von Malaisé. When he was ten years old, the family moved to the Leuchtenberg Palace.

In 1861 at the age of sixteen, Ludwig began his military career when his uncle, King Maximilian II of Bavaria, gave him a commission as a lieutenant in the 6th Jägerbattalion. A year later, he entered LMU Munich, where he studied law and economics. When he was eighteen, he automatically became a member of the Senate of the Bavarian Legislature as a prince of the royal house.

In 1866, Bavaria was allied with the Austrian Empire in the Austro-Prussian War. Ludwig held the rank of Oberleutnant. He was wounded at the Battle of Helmstadt, taking a bullet in his thigh. The incident contributed to the fact that he was rather averse to the military. He received the Knight's Cross 1st Class of the Bavarian Military Merit Order.

== Marriage and children ==
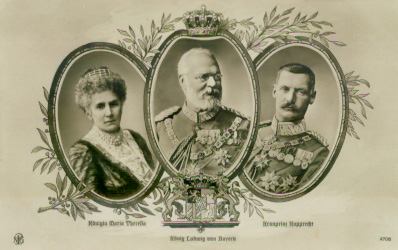
King Ludwig III, his consort Maria Theresia and their son, Crown Prince Rupprecht.

In June 1867, Ludwig visited Vienna to attend the funeral of his cousin, Archduchess Mathilda of Austria (daughter of his father's sister Princess Hildegard of Bavaria). While there, Ludwig met Mathilde's 18-year-old step-cousin Maria Theresia, Archduchess of Austria-Este, the only daughter of the late Archduke Ferdinand Karl Viktor of Austria-Este (1821–1849) and Archduchess Elisabeth Franziska of Austria (1831–1903), and they married on 20 February 1868 at St. Augustine's Church in Vienna.

Until 1862, Ludwig's uncle had reigned as King Otto I of Greece. Although Otto had been deposed, Ludwig was still in line of succession to the Greek throne. Had he ever succeeded, this would have required that he renounce his Roman Catholic faith and become Greek Orthodox. Maria Theresa's uncle, Francis V, Duke of Modena, was a staunch Roman Catholic. He required that as part of the marriage agreement Ludwig renounce his rights to the throne of Greece, and so ensure that his children would be raised Roman Catholic. In addition, the 1843 Greek Constitution forbade the Greek sovereign to be simultaneously ruler of another country. Consequently, Ludwig's younger brother Leopold technically succeeded upon their father's death to the rights of the deposed Otto I, King of Greece. However, after Otto's deposition none of the Wittelsbach family ever pursued a claim.

By his marriage, Ludwig became a wealthy man. Maria Theresa had inherited large properties from her father. She owned the estate of Sárvár in Hungary and the estate of Eiwanowitz in Moravia (now Ivanovice na Hané in the Czech Republic). The income from these estates enabled Ludwig to purchase an estate at Leutstetten in Bavaria. Over the years, Ludwig expanded the Leutstetten estate until it became one of the largest and most profitable in Bavaria. Ludwig was sometimes derided as Millibauer (dairy farmer) due to his interest in agriculture and farming.

Although they maintained a residence in Munich at the Leuchtenberg Palace, Ludwig and Maria Theresa lived mostly at Leutstetten. Ludwig and Maria had 13 children.

Front row:Princess Adelgunde, Princess Helmtrud and Prince Franz.Back row:Princess Gundelinde,Princess Hildegard, Prince Karl and Princess Wiltrud.

- Rupprecht, Crown Prince of Bavaria (18 May 1869 – 2 August 1955), married Duchess Marie Gabriele in Bavaria on 10 August 1900.
- Princess Adelgunde of Bavaria (17 October 1870 – 4 January 1958) married Prince Wilhelm of Hohenzollern on 20 January 1915.
- Maria Ludwiga, Princess of Bavaria (6 July 1872 – 10 June 1954) married Prince Ferdinand Pius of Bourbon-Two Sicilies on 31 May 1897. They had six children, including Princess Urraca of Bourbon-Two Sicilies.
- Karl, Prince of Bavaria (1 April 1874 – 9 May 1927)
- Franz, Prince of Bavaria (10 October 1875 – 25 January 1957) married Princess Isabella Antonie of Croÿ on 8 July 1912
- Princess Mathilde of Bavaria (17 August 1877 – 6 August 1906) married Prince Ludwig of Saxe-Coburg and Gotha on 1 May 1900. They had two children.
- Prince Wolfgang Maria Leopold of Bavaria (2 July 1879 – 31 January 1895)
- Princess Hildegard of Bavaria (5 March 1881 – 2 February 1948)
- Princess Notburga of Bavaria (19 March 1883 – 24 March 1883)
- Princess Wiltrud of Bavaria (10 November 1884 – 28 March 1975), married Wilhelm, Duke of Urach on 26 November 1924.
- Princess Helmtrud of Bavaria (22 March 1886 – 23 June 1977)
- Princess Dietlinde of Bavaria (2 January 1888 – 15 February 1889)
- Princess Gundelinde of Bavaria (26 August 1891 – 16 August 1983), married Count Johann Georg of Preysing-Lichtenegg-Moos on 23 February 1919. They had two children.

On the death of her uncle Francis in 1875, Maria Theresa inherited his Jacobite claim to the thrones of England, Ireland and Scotland, and is called either Queen Mary IV and III or Queen Mary III by Jacobites.

== Service and politics ==
Throughout his life, Ludwig took a great interest in agriculture. From 1868, he was the Honorary President of the Central Committee of the Bavarian Agricultural Society. In 1875, he bought Leutstetten Castle and made it a model farm. He was also very interested in technology, particularly water power. In 1891 at his initiation, the Bavarian Canal Society was established. In 1896 Prince Ludwig was appointed honorary member of the Bavarian Academy of Sciences.

As a prince of the royal house he was automatically a member of the Senate of the Bavarian legislature; there he was a great supporter of the direct right to vote. Since 23 June 1863 already, Ludwig had been a member of the Chamber of the Reichsräte. In 1870 he voted as a member of the Bundesrat for the acceptance of the November treaties to join the North German Confederation. In 1871 he ran unsuccessfully for the first Reichstag elections as a candidate of the Bavarian Patriot Party. In 1906 he supported the Bavarian electoral reform, which the SPD founder August Bebel praised: "The German people, if the Kaiser were to be chosen from one of the German princes, would presumably elect Wittelsbach Ludwig and not Prussia's Wilhelm."

== Regent of Bavaria ==
On 12 December 1912, Ludwig's father Luitpold died. Luitpold had been an active participant in the deposition of his nephew, Ludwig II, and had also acted as prince regent for his other nephew, King Otto. Although Otto had nominally been king since 1886, he had been under medical supervision since 1883 and it had long been understood that he would never be mentally capable of actively reigning. Ludwig III immediately succeeded his father as regent.

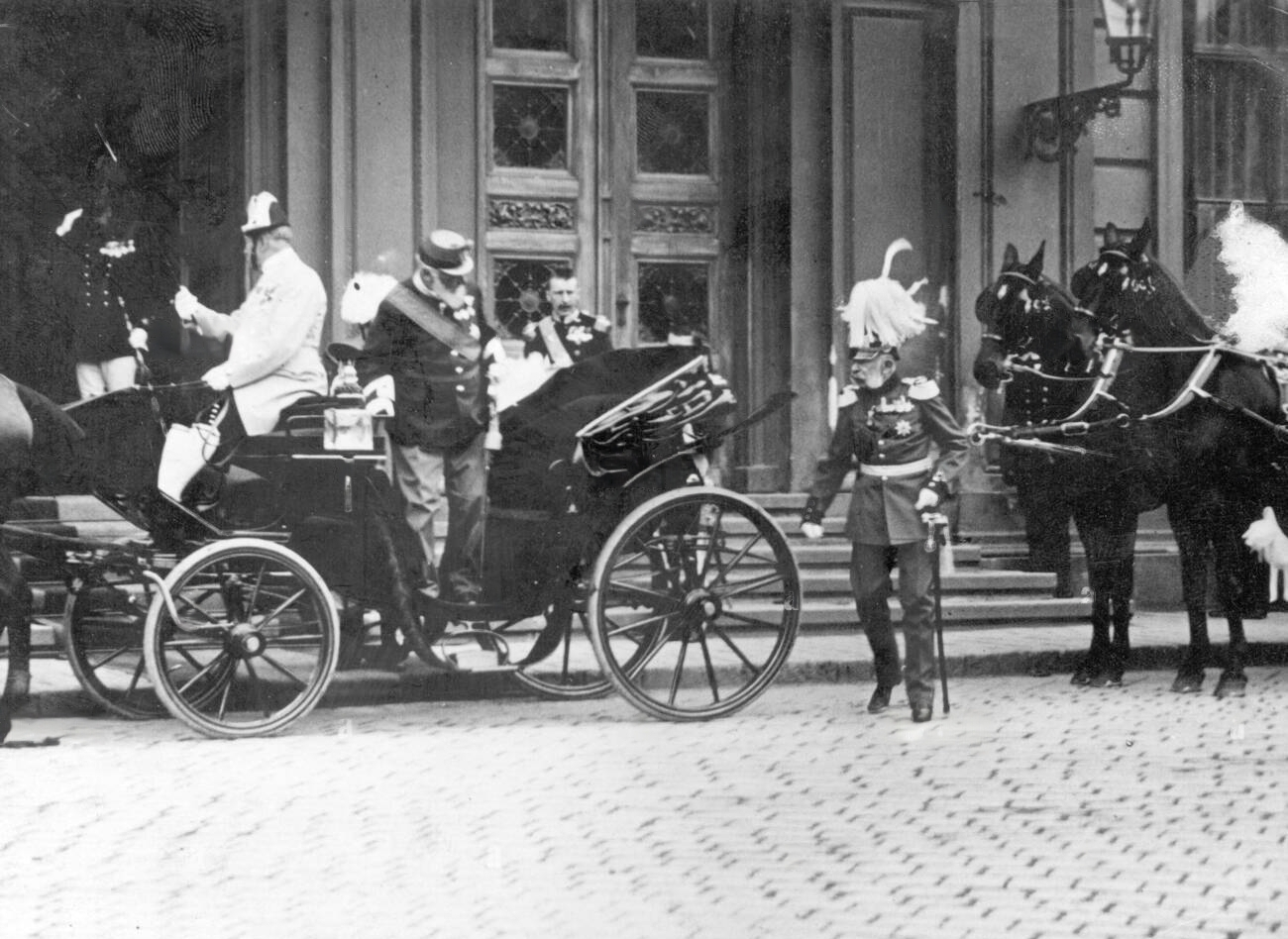
Emperor Franz Joseph together with the regent Ludwig in a carriage during a state visit to Wien (1900)

Almost immediately, certain elements in the press and other groups in society called for Ludwig to take the throne himself. The Bavarian Legislature was not, however, currently in session, and did not meet until 29 September 1913. On 4 November 1913, the legislature amended the constitution of Bavaria to include a clause specifying that if a regency for reasons of incapacity had lasted for ten years with no prospect of the king ever being able to reign, the regent could proclaim the end of the regency and assume the crown himself, with such action to be ratified by the legislature. The amendment received broad party support in the Lower Chamber where it was carried by a vote of 122 in favour, and 27 against. In the Senate there were only six votes against the amendment. The next day, on the 5th of November, 1913, Ludwig III was declared king of Bavaria, replacing Otto.

The constitutional amendment of 1913 brought a determining break in the continuity of the king's rule in the opinion of historians, particularly as this change had been granted by the Landtag as a House of Representatives. Historians believe this marked a definitive step toward a modern constitutional monarchy with the king as a figurehead. Bavaria had already taken a step toward full parliamentary government a year earlier, when Georg von Hertling headed the first government that depended on a majority in the legislature.

== King of Bavaria ==
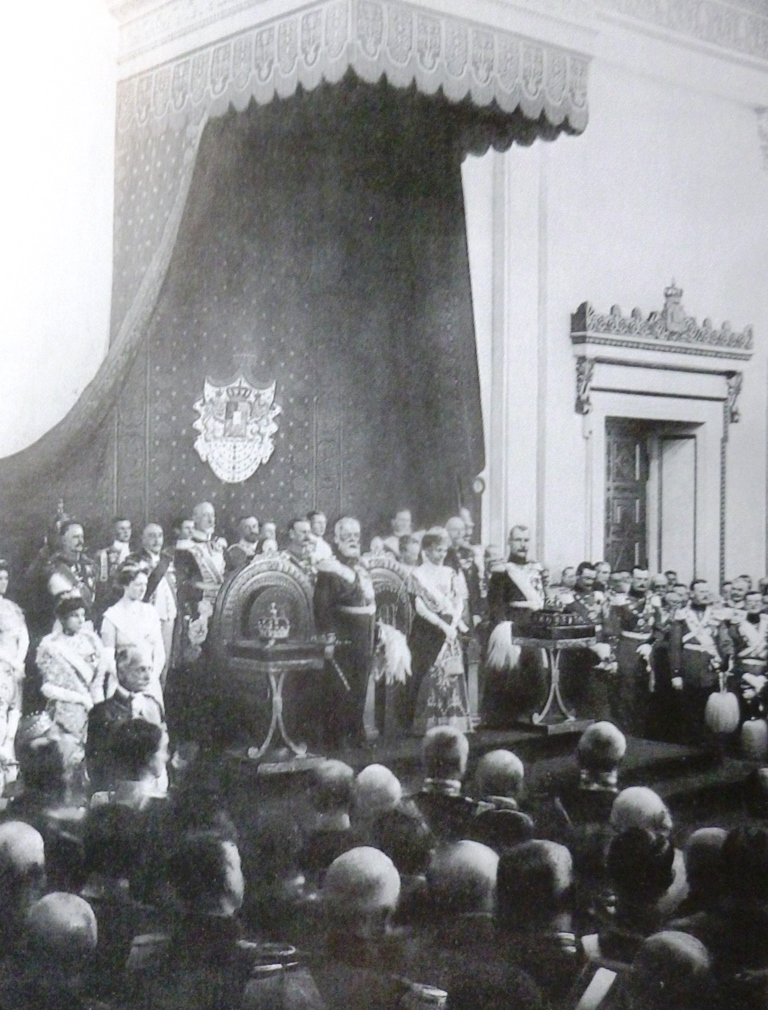
Solemn Oath of King Ludwig III of Bavaria (1913)

Ludwig's short reign was conservative and influenced by the Catholic encyclical Rerum novarum. Prime Minister Georg von Hertling, appointed by Luitpold in 1912, remained in office. Also as King Ludwig lived in the Wittelsbacher Palais rather than in the Munich Residenz.

When World War I first began, in 1914, Ludwig expressed support for the German Empire. Later, Ludwig claimed annexations for Bavaria (Alsace and the city of Antwerp in Belgium).

A spurious story holds that, a day or two after Germany's declaration of war, Ludwig received a petition from a 25-year-old Austrian, asking for permission to join the Bavarian Army. The petition was promptly granted, and Adolf Hitler thereupon joined the Bavarian Army, eventually settling into the 16th Reserve Bavarian Infantry Regiment, where he served the remainder of the war. However, this account is based on Hitler's recollections in Mein Kampf. Historian Ian Kershaw holds that Hitler's story is simply not credible on its face, due to the remarkable bureaucratic effort it would have required to attend to this minor matter during days of extreme crisis. Based on Bavarian government investigations in 1924, the more likely scenario in Kershaw's view is that Hitler applied for enlistment, along with thousands of other youths, on or about 5 August 1914, was initially turned away because the authorities were overwhelmed with applicants and had no place to assign him, and eventually was recalled to serve in the 2nd Infantry Regiment (2nd Battalion), before being assigned to Bavarian Reserve Infantry Regiment 16 (the List Regiment), which was principally made up of raw recruits.

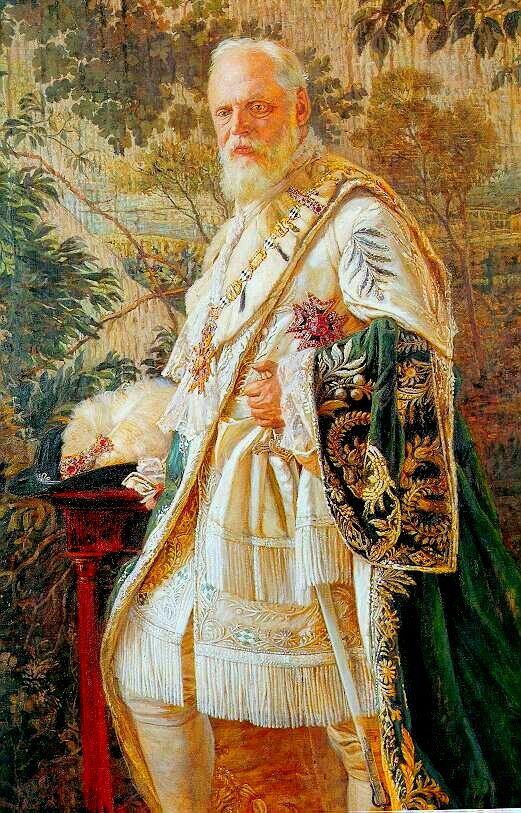
Portrait of Ludwig III, aged 70

In 1917, when Germany's situation had gradually worsened due to World War I, Hertling became German Chancellor and Minister President of Prussia and Otto Ritter von Dandl was made Minister of State of the Royal Household and of the Exterior and President of the Council of Ministers on 11 November 1917, a title equivalent to Prime Minister of Bavaria. Accused of showing blind loyalty to Prussia, Ludwig became increasingly unpopular during the war. As the war drew to a close, in 1918, the German Revolution broke out in Bavaria.

Already discussed since September 1917, on 2 November 1918, an extensive constitutional reform was established by an agreement between the royal government and all parliamentary groups, which, among other things, envisaged the introduction of proportional representation. On the same day, Ludwig III approved the transformation of the constitutional monarchy into a parliamentary monarchy. For the first time on 3 November 1918, initiated by the USPD, a thousand people gathered to protest on the Theresienwiese for peace and demanded the release of detained leaders. On 7 November 1918, Ludwig fled from the Residenz Palace in Munich with his family and took up residence in Schloss Anif, near Salzburg, for what he hoped would be a temporary stay. He was the first of the monarchs in the German Empire to be deposed. The next day, the People's State of Bavaria was proclaimed.

On 12 November 1918, a day after the Armistice, Prime Minister Dandl went to Schloss Anif to see the King in hopes of persuading him to abdicate. Ludwig refused, instead giving Dandl the Anif declaration (Anifer Erklärung) in which he released all government officials, soldiers and civil officers from their oath of loyalty to him. He also stated that as a result of recent events, he was "no longer in a position to lead the government." The declaration was published by the newly formed republican government of Kurt Eisner when Dandl returned to Munich the next day. Although the word "abdication" never appeared in the document, Eisner's government interpreted it as such and added a statement that Ludwig and his family were welcome to return to Bavaria as private citizens as long as they did not act against the "people's state." This statement effectively dethroned the Wittelsbachs and ended the family's 738-year rule over Bavaria.

== Final years ==
Maria Theresia, Ludwig's wife, died on 3 February 1919, at Wildenwart Castle in Chiemgau.

In February 1919, Eisner was assassinated; fearing that he might be the victim of a counter-assassination, Ludwig fled to Hungary, later moving on to Liechtenstein and Switzerland. He returned to Bavaria in April 1920 and lived at Wildenwart Castle again. Ludwig III died in the estate Nádasdy in Sárvár, Hungary, on 17 October 1921.

On 5 November 1921, Ludwig's body was returned to Munich together with that of his wife. In spite of fears a state funeral might spark a move to restore the monarchy, the pair were honored with one -- including the royal family, Bavarian government, military personnel, and an estimated 100,000 spectators. The burial took place in the crypt of the Munich Frauenkirche alongside their royal ancestors. Prince Rupprecht did not wish to use the occasion of the passing of his father to reestablish the monarchy by force, preferring to do so by legal means. Cardinal Michael von Faulhaber, Archbishop of Munich, in his funeral speech, made a clear commitment to the monarchy while Rupprecht only declared that he had stepped into his birthright.

== Honours ==
Greater Royal Coat of Arms of King Ludwig III of Bavaria

- Kingdom of Bavaria:
  - Knight of St. Hubert
  - Knight of the Military Merit Order, 1st Class, ca. 1866
  - Grand Prior of Upper Bavaria of the Royal Bavarian House Equestrian Order of St. George, 1874
  - Grand Cross of the Military Order of Max Joseph
- Grand Duchy of Hesse: Grand Cross of the Ludwig Order, 17 September 1863
- (Austrian Empire) (Kingdom of Hungary) Austria-Hungary:
  - Knight of the Golden Fleece, 1868
  - Grand Cross of the Royal Hungarian Order of St. Stephen, 1893
  - Grand Cross of the Military Order of Maria Theresa, 1917
- Oldenburg: Grand Cross of the Order of Duke Peter Friedrich Ludwig, with Golden Crown, 14 June 1869
- Kingdom of Prussia:
  - Knight of the Black Eagle, 24 July 1869
  - Pour le Mérite (military)
- Württemberg:
  - Grand Cross of the Württemberg Crown, 1876
  - Grand Cross of the Military Merit Order
- Spain: Grand Cross of the Order of Charles III, 19 December 1883
- Baden:
  - Knight of the House Order of Fidelity, 1887
  - Knight of the Order of Berthold the First, 1887
- Saxe-Weimar-Eisenach: Grand Cross of the White Falcon, 1888
- Sweden-Norway: Knight of the Seraphim, 12 July 1895
- Kingdom of Italy: Knight of the Annunciation, 6 September 1897
- Belgium: Grand Cordon of the Order of Leopold, 1900 – wedding gift
- Kingdom of Romania: Collar of the Order of Carol I, 1913
- Denmark: Knight of the Elephant
- Sovereign Military Order of Malta: Bailiff Grand Cross of Honour and Devotion
- Ottoman Empire: Order of Imtyiaz
- Russian Empire: Knight of St. Andrew
- Kingdom of Saxony: Knight of the Rue Crown

== Ancestry ==
Ancestors of Ludwig III of Bavaria

8. Maximilian I Joseph of Bavaria
4. Ludwig I of Bavaria
9. Princess Augusta Wilhelmine of Hesse-Darmstadt
2. Luitpold, Prince Regent of Bavaria
10. Frederick, Duke of Saxe-Altenburg
5. Princess Therese of Saxe-Hildburghausen
11. Duchess Charlotte Georgine of Mecklenburg-Strelitz
1. Ludwig III of Bavaria
12. Ferdinand III, Grand Duke of Tuscany
6. Leopold II, Grand Duke of Tuscany
13. Princess Luisa of Naples and Sicily
3. Archduchess Auguste Ferdinande of Austria
14. Maximilian, Hereditary Prince of Saxony
7. Princess Maria Anna of Saxony
15. Princess Carolina of Parma

== Sources ==
- Ludwig III. von Bayern, 1845–1921, Ein König auf der Suche nach seinem Volk, by Alfons Beckenbauer (Regensburg: Friedrich Pustet, 1987). The standard modern biography.
- Ludwig, Prinz von Bayern, Ein Lebens und Charakterbild, by Hans Reidelbach (München: Eduard Pohls, 1905). Particularly good for Ludwig's early life.
- Von der Umsturznacht bis zur Totenbahre: Die letzte Leidenszeit König Ludwigs III., by Arthur Achleitner (Dillingen: Veduka, 1922). A detailed work about the last three years of Ludwig's life.
- Ludwig III. König von Bayern: Skizzen aus seiner Lebensgeschichte, by Hubert Glaser (Prien: Verkerhrsverband Chiemsee, 1995). An illustrated catalogue of an exhibition held in Wildenwart in 1995.

Ludwig III of Bavaria House of Wittelsbach Born: 7 January 1845 Died: 18 October 1921
Regnal titles
Preceded by Otto	King of Bavaria; 5 November 1913 – 13 November 1918	Monarchy abolished German Revolution
Titles in pretence
Himself	— TITULAR — King of Bavaria; 13 November 1918 - 18 October 1921; Reason for succession failure: Kingdom abolished in 1918	Succeeded by Rupprecht
