= Anif declaration =

Declaration issued by Ludwig III, King of Bavaria

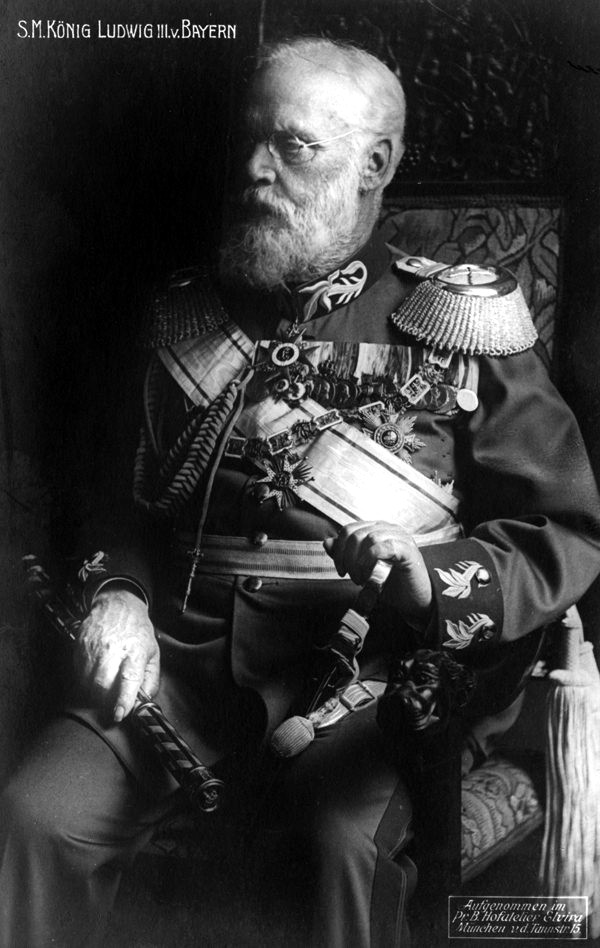
King Ludwig III of Bavaria, who issued the Anif declaration

The Anif declaration (German: Anifer Erklärung) was issued by Ludwig III, King of Bavaria, on 12 November 1918 at Anif Palace, Austria.

It was a declaration in which the monarch relieved all civil servants and military personnel from their oath of loyalty to him. Although he never used the word "abdication," the new socialist government of Kurt Eisner deemed it as such and declared Ludwig deposed. This effectively ended the 738-year dynasty of the House of Wittelsbach in Bavaria.

== Historical background ==
With the imminent collapse of the German Empire at the end of the First World War in November 1918, the Kingdom of Bavaria, like all other states of the Empire, was in a state of transition from a monarchy to a republic.

Max von Speidel, Minister of War in the Bavarian government, under orders from Kurt Eisner, tried to persuade King Ludwig on 10 November (the day before the Armistice) to issue a declaration in which he would release all officers of the Bavarian Army of their oath. Speidel however arrived at the King's residence at Schloss Wildenwart, near Rosenheim, after Ludwig had already left for Austria.

Ludwig III decided to leave Bavaria temporarily for Austria, and, following an invitation of Ernst Graf von Moy, decided to take up residence at Anif Palace, near Salzburg. There, he ordered Otto Ritter von Dandl, the last prime minister of the Kingdom of Bavaria, to issue a declaration. Dandl demanded an abdication but the King was only willing to issue a statement absolving all officers, soldiers and government officials of the Kingdom of their oath. With this, the Anif declaration, Dandl returned to the Bavarian capital, Munich.

== The declaration ==
The original document of the declaration has been lost. It was in the possession of the then interior minister of Bavaria, Erhard Auer, but was lost during the Hitler Putsch in 1923. Only typed copies exist now, bearing handwritten additions by Kurt Eisner.

Zeit meines Lebens habe ich mit dem Volk und für das Volk gearbeitet. Die Sorge um das Wohl meines geliebten Bayern war stets mein höchstes Streben.

Nachdem ich infolge der Ereignisse der letzten Tage nicht mehr in der Lage bin die Regierung weiterzuführen, stelle ich allen Beamten, Offizieren und Soldaten die Weiterarbeit unter den gegebenen Verhältnissen frei und entbinde sie des mir geleisteten Treueides.

Translation:

All my lifetime I have worked with the people and for the people. The care for the well-being of my beloved Bavaria was always my highest concern.

Since I am, in consequence of recent events, no longer in a position to lead the government, I offer all officials, officers and soldiers the free choice to continue their service and relieve them of their oath to me.

== Publication ==
Dandl returned to Munich the same day and the government under Eisner published the declaration as the abdication of Ludwig III.

Eisner had the declaration published word by word, adding a postscript stating that the People's State of Bavaria (German: Volksstaat Bayern) accepted Ludwig's abdication and assured him and his family that they were free to return to Bavaria, provided they took no steps against the people's state and accepted the status of private citizens. While some, even conservative politicians, shared the government's interpretation of the declaration as an abdication, others pointed out the discrepancy between its wording and its use by the government as a declaration of abdication. Nevertheless, the declaration effectively ended Wittelsbach rule.

After the death of Ludwig III in 1921, his son, Crown Prince Rupprecht, asserted his rights to the Bavarian crown, claiming it to be his birthright to be King of Bavaria unless the people decided on a different form of government after free elections. Until his death in 1955, Rupprecht continued to demand that the question of whether Bavaria would be a republic or a monarchy should be decided by a constituent assembly chosen in a democratic election.
