= Borbála Nádasdy =

Hungarian noble and actor

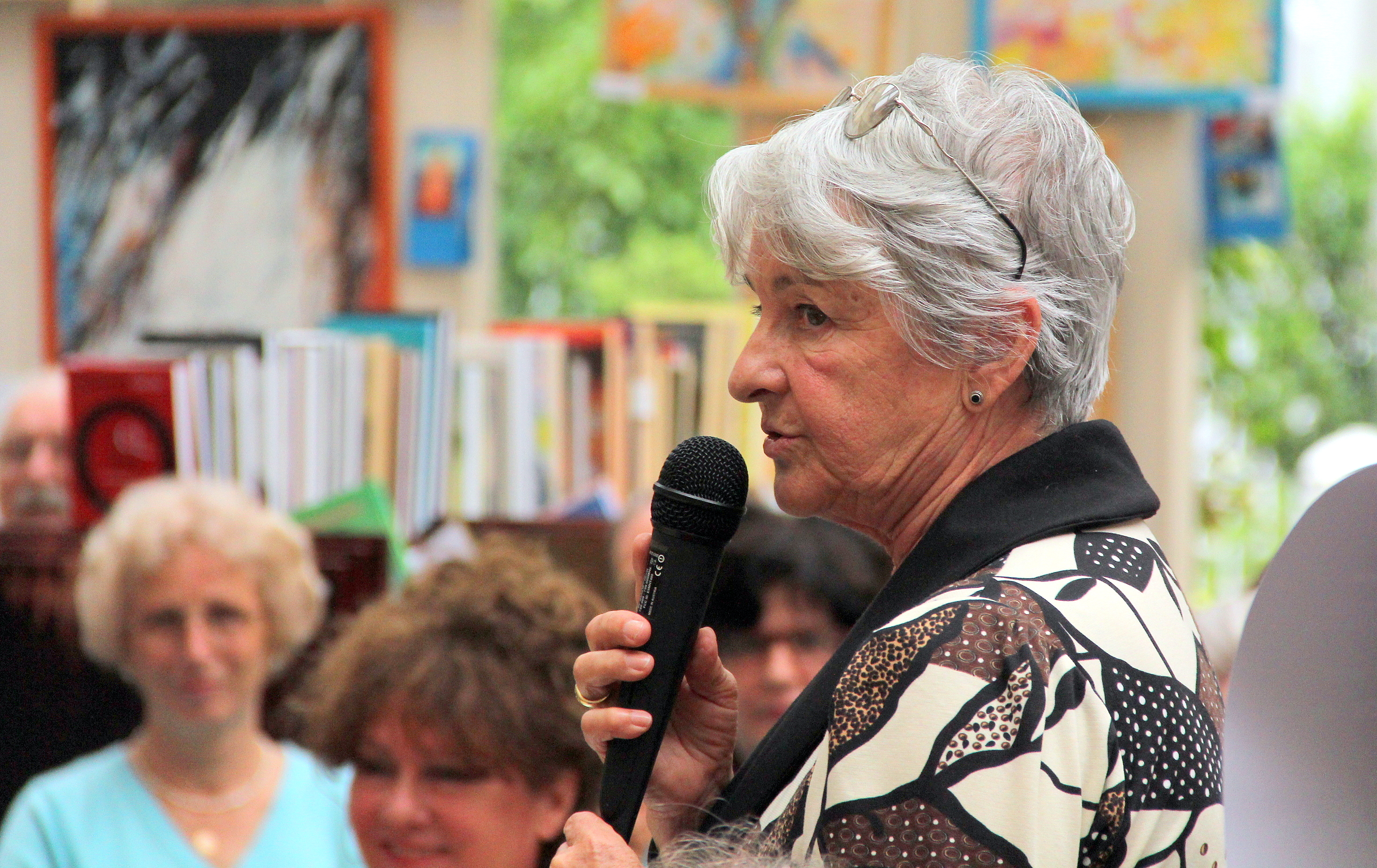
Countess Borbála Nádasdy in Budapest, 2012.

Countess Borbála Nádasdy de Nádasd et Fogarasföld (born 1939) is a Hungarian noble, actress, and author.

== Biography ==
Countess Borbála Nádasdy was born in Budapest as a member of the Nádasdy family, one of the major Hungarian aristocratic families. Her father was Count Pál Nádasdy (1910–1974) and her mother was Antónia Augner (1914–2006), a famous dancer. Nádasdys had another daughter, Countess Erzsebet Maria (b. 1935).

After the Second World War monarchists were persecuted in Hungary, so Borbála escaped to Vienna, where she became a famous movie and stage actress. The government revoked the citizenship of Borbála and she found herself stateless. She appeared in only two movies as Barbara von Nady and she played several roles on stage. Years later she moved to Paris, and worked for a ballet master.

== Personal life ==
Borbála married two times. In 1958 she married Dimitry Fedotov in Paris, whom she divorced in 1964. Today, she lives in Dourdan with her second husband, Jean Poyeton, whom she married in 1966. She is a mother and a grandmother.

== Major literary work ==
Her first novel, Zagolni zabad? (2008) was her memoirs. It was followed by two books, A zabadság zaga which was published in 2009 and Maradni zabad! which was released in 2010. She wrote a cookbook called Ízes Élet! which was published in 2012.

For her literary work she was awarded with the Order of Merit of the Republic of Hungary in 2012.

== Sources ==
- Borbála Nádasdy at IMDb
