= Otto Ritter von Dandl =

Bavarian politician and lawyer

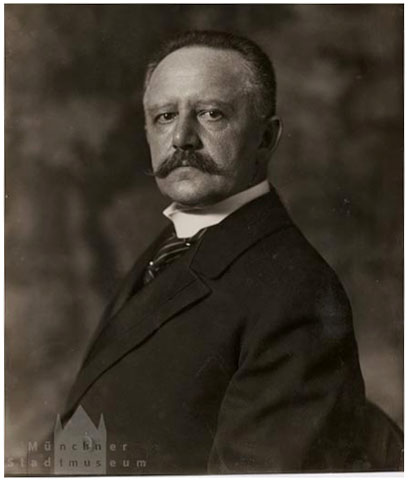

Minister President of Bavaria
- In office 11 November 1917 – 7 November 1918
- Monarch: Ludwig III
- Preceded by: Georg von Hertling
- Succeeded by: Kurt Eisner

Personal details
- Born: 13 May 1868 Straubing
- Died: 20 May 1942 (aged 74)
- Occupation: Lawyer

Otto Ritter von Dandl (13 May 1868 in Straubing – 20 May 1942) was a German politician and lawyer who was the last Minister-President of the Kingdom of Bavaria.

== Life ==
Otto Ritter von Dandl was born in Straubing, Lower Bavaria, in 1868, his parents being Georg Ritter von Dandl and Karoline Weninger. He studied law and graduated in 1890. He entered the Bavarian government service, becoming a judge at the court in Munich. He rose through the ranks quickly, occupying a position in the justice department from 1900.

In 1906, von Dandl became an adviser of Prinzregent Luitpold, who ruled Bavaria in his nephew's, King Otto's stead. With the death of Luitpold in 1912, his son Ludwig took up the position as Prinzregent (Prince Regent) of Bavaria and von Dandl became the chief of his cabinet. Ludwig acceded to the throne of Bavaria as Ludwig III in 1913 and bestowed the title of Staatsrat on von Dandl.

In 1917, when Germany's situation had gradually worsened due to World War I, Otto Ritter von Dandl was made Minister of State of the Royal Household and of the Exterior and President of the Council of Ministers on 11 November 1917, a title equivalent to Prime Minister of Bavaria.

On 2 November 1918, von Dandl reached an agreement with all major parties, to reform Bavaria and to build a new coalition government with him as leaders and prominent members of the Zentrumspartei and the SPD in ministerial posts. The event of the German surrender a few days after meant, this government never came to be. It would have included three future Bavarian prime ministers, Heinrich Held, Eugen von Knilling and Johannes Hoffmann as ministers.

He only held this position for one year; with the collapse of Imperial Germany, the Kingdom of Bavaria was abolished by Kurt Eisner on 8 November 1918, who succeeded him to the office of prime minister, making von Dandl the last prime minister of the Kingdom of Bavaria.

On 12 November 1918, Dandl went to Schloss Anif, near Salzburg, to see the King and obtain what is known as the Anifer Erklärung (Anif declaration) in which the King released all government officials, soldiers and officers from their oath to him, but did not formally abdicate. The Eisner government published the declaration when Dandl returned to Munich the next day, interpreting it, somewhat ambiguously, as an abdication and declared the Wittelsbachs deposed.

Von Dandl remained in government service, becoming the director of the taxation department in Würzburg in 1919. From 1929 to 1933, he held the same position in Munich.

In his town of birth, Straubing, a street is named after him, the Otto-von-Dandl-Ring.

Ritter, as in the name Otto Ritter von Dandl, is not a name but a noble title, considered roughly equal to the title Knight or Baronet.

== See also ==
- List of minister-presidents of Bavaria

== Sources ==
- Universitätsbibliothek Regensburg - Bosls bayrische Biographie - Otto Ritter von Dandl (in German) author: Karl Bosl, publisher: Pustet, page 127

Political offices
Preceded by Georg von Hertling	Prime Minister of Bavaria; 1917 – 1918	Succeeded by Kurt Eisner
