= Adolf von Harnier =

German lawyer

Adolf von Harnier

Adolf Freiherr von Harnier (14 April 1903 – 12 May 1945) was a German lawyer and member of the resistance against the Nazi Party. Born in Bavaria, he was the son of a landowner. He earned a doctor of law degree in 1934 and then settled in Munich as a lawyer. He rejected Nazism and was converted to Catholicism. As a jurist, he defended clerics and Jews during the Nazi era. He was the leader of a group which supported the restoration of monarchism in Bavaria.

Denounced by a Gestapo informer, he was arrested in 1939. Tried for treason, he was sentenced to ten years in prison. He died of typhoid fever on 12 May 1945, shortly after the prison in Straubing he was detained in was liberated by US Troops.
