= Anif Palace =

Palace in Austria

- Schloss Anif
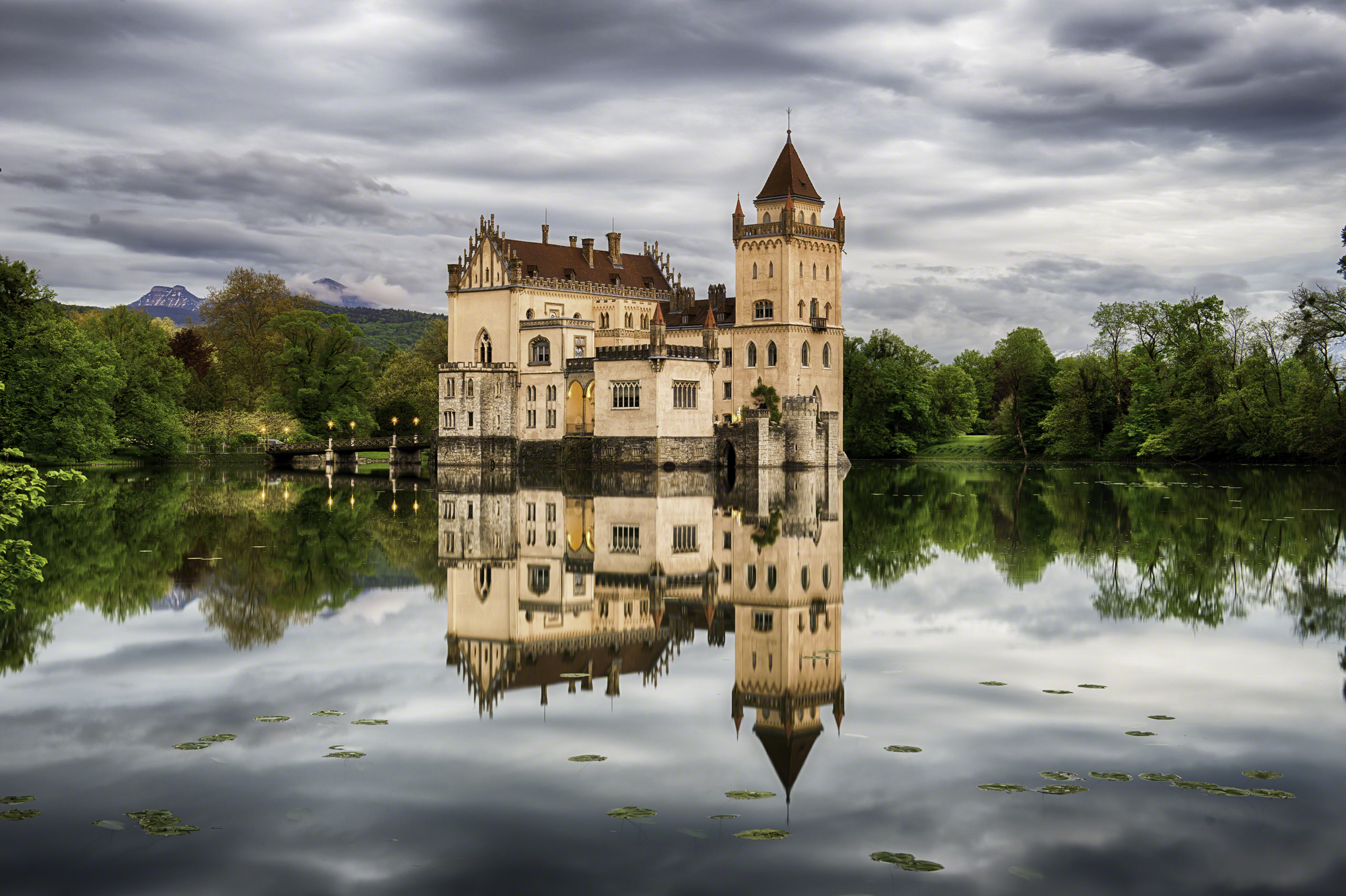

- Location within Salzburg
- Alternative names: Water Palace Anif

General information
- Location: Salzburg, Austria
- Coordinates: 47°44′42″N 13°04′13″E
- Year built: c. 1530
- Owner: von Moy family

Anif Palace (German: Schloss Anif), also known as the Water Palace Anif, is located beside an artificial pond in Anif on the southern edge of Salzburg, Austria. The palace was once the seat of the bishops of Chiemsee, and then later was used as a court until the nineteenth century. It was remodeled between 1838 and 1848 in the neo-Gothic style. Anif is most famous for its use in several movies, including The Sound of Music, The Great Race, and Frederick Forsyth's The Odessa File.

== History ==
The palace's origins cannot be exactly dated; a document from around 1520 shows a palace there called Oberweiher. Its owner was the dominion directory bailiff Lienhart Praunecker.

From 1530 the water palace is mentioned regularly as a fief given by the respective Archbishop of Salzburg. It was so given to the bishops of Chiemsee after a restoration by Johann Ernst von Thun in 1693; from then on the bishops used it as a summer residence. It consisted simply of a plain four-story dwelling with a two-story building connecting it to a chapel.

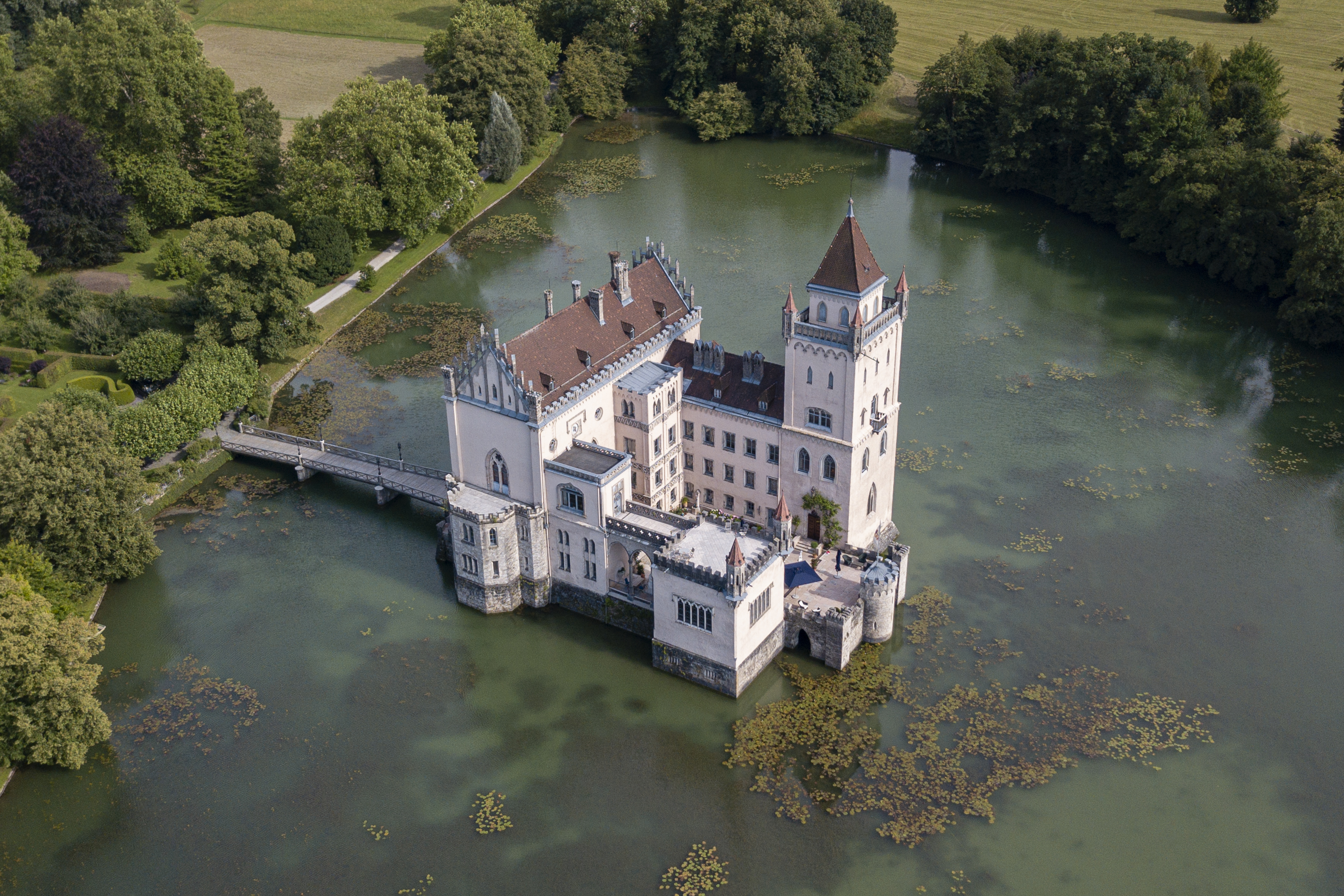
Anif Palace in Salzburg

When Salzburg fell to Austria in 1806, the palace and the pond came into public ownership. Leased from that point on, it was little altered or restored until being sold to Alois Count Arco-Stepperg in 1837. He rebuilt it between 1838 and 1848 in the neo-Gothic romanticizing style seen today.

After the death of the Count in 1891 the property fell to his nearest female relative, Sophie, who was married to the Count Ernst von Moy de Sons of an old French noble family.

In 1918, the palace attracted public attention when King Ludwig III of Bavaria and his family and entourage fled to escape the November Revolution. With the Declaration of Anif on 12/13 November 1918, Ludwig III refused to abdicate, and instead freed all Bavarian government officials, soldiers and officers from their oath because he was not able to continue the government.

During World War II the German Wehrmacht units were accommodated in the palace, followed by American units in 1945.

== Present ==
In October 2001 the palace and its owner Johannes Count von Moy de Sons made news headlines when it was revealed that part of the furniture, which had been put under historic preservation status as an ensemble with the palace, had been offered for sale at Sotheby's in Amsterdam. Some of the pieces were returned to Austria and are now partly visible in the Museum Carolino Augusteum of Salzburg.

The Anif Palace is still privately owned by the family von Moy, who restored it fundamentally between 1995 and 2000. Public tours of this historic building are not provided.

This castle was used in the movies The Great Race as Baron von Stuppe's (Ross Martin) residence and The Odessa File as Roschmann's castle. Director Bryan Forbes revealed that the castle also appeared in the movie The Slipper and the Rose for exterior scenes, as Cinderella's home.

== Gallery ==
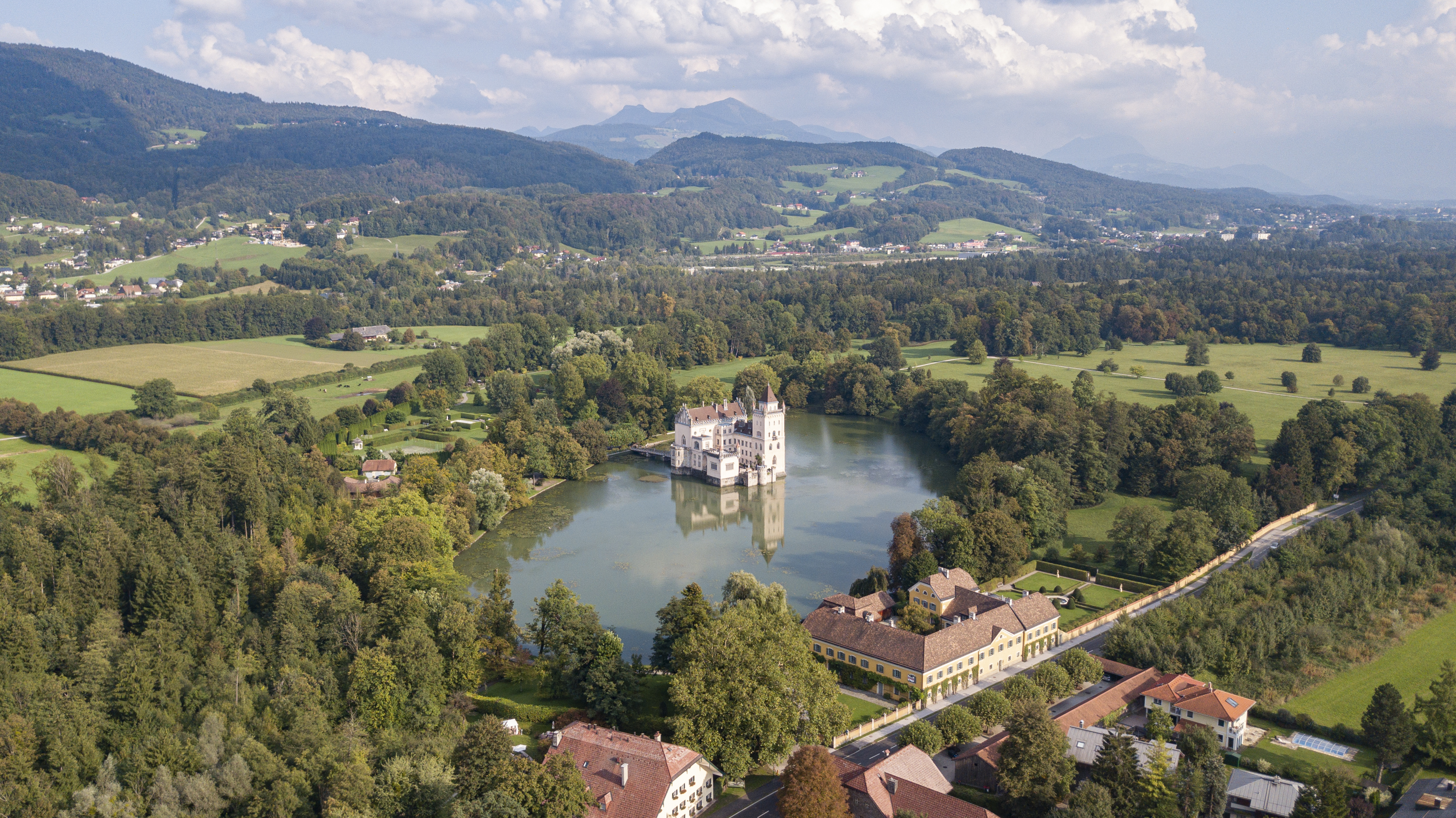
Anif Palace from the north

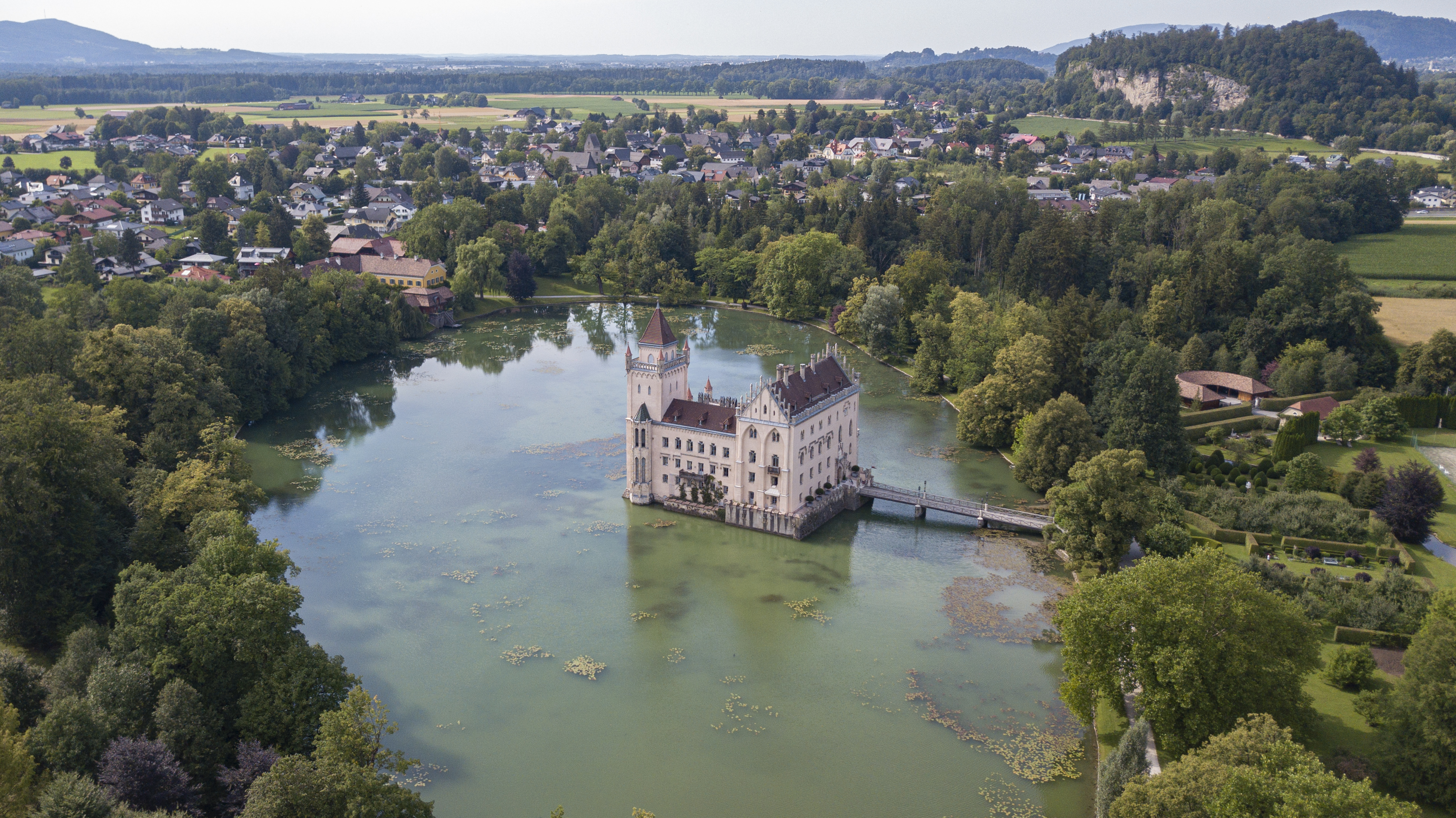
Anif Palace from the south

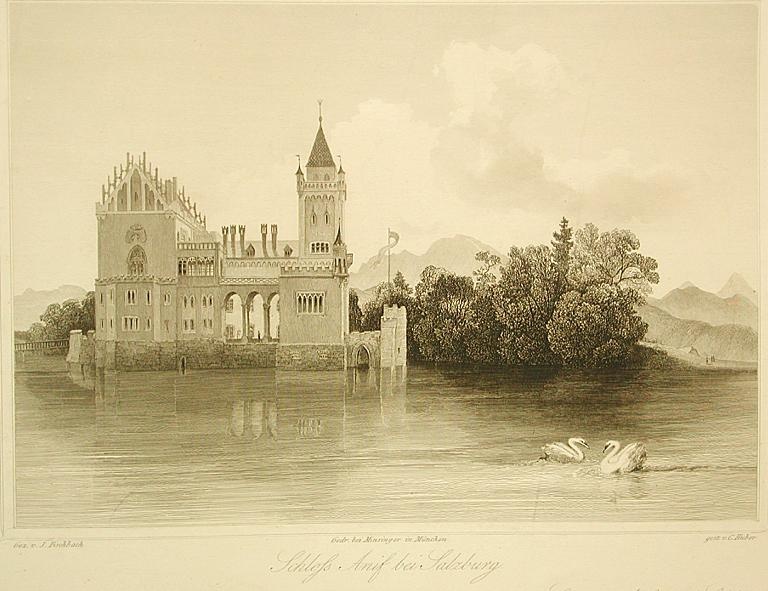
Steel engraving, 1852
