= Nádasdy Mansion =

Mansion in Fejér, Hungary

Coordinates: 47°08′25″N 18°14′23″E

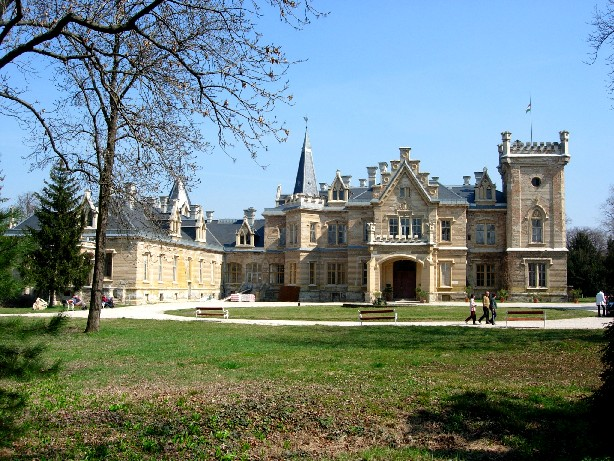
The mansion in 2006 before its renovation

The Nádasdy Mansion is a Neo-Gothic style manor house designed by István Linzbauer and Alajos Hauszmann situated on 24 hectares in Nádasdladány, Hungary. It dates from 1873 to 1876, and belonged to the Nádasdy family. It was used for the exterior of the vampires' mansion in the Underworld film series and Chateau de Roussillon in Now You See Me: Now You Don't.

The ancestors of the Nádasdy family had estates in the area as early as the 14th century. The Counts of Schmidegg acquired the estate in Ladány in 1736. Leopold Nádasdy bought the mansion from Károly Schmidegg in 1851, the name of which was later changed to Nádasdladány at the request of the family. Leopold then established the new headquarters of his estates here.

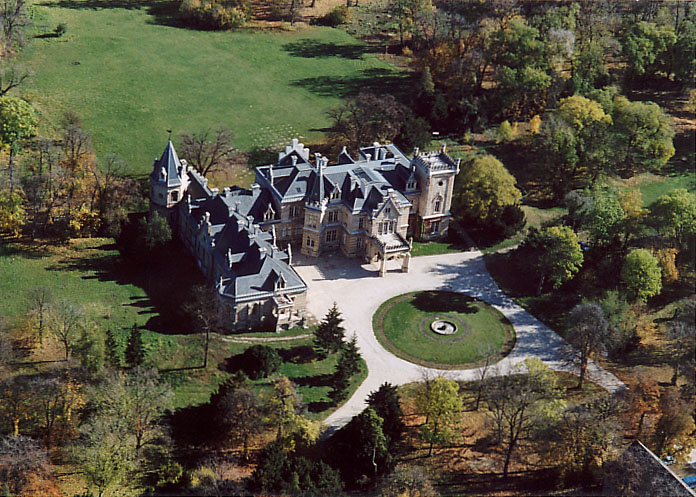
Airview of the mansion

Water, gas lighting, and telephone as well as a sewerage network was built and introduced in the 19th century. In addition to traditional stoves and fireplaces, heating was provided by an air-inflating system with a peat boiler in the basement. A special feature of the building is that the kitchen is not located in the castle, but in a separate building erected in the garden; food was delivered to the main building on underground rails. The building had a separate church, which was consecrated in 1885. After World War II and the escape of the Nádasdy family, the building was looted. The castle came into the possession of the Ministry of Defense in 1982. From 1982 to 1994, the building stood vacant; due to the lack of basic maintenance work, the building fabric deteriorated significantly. It was soaked several times and the building was not heated in winter; as a result, the wood paneling of the Hall of Ancestors and the library were coated with mold fungi.

The building was declared a priority monument in 1993, after which it became the property of the Hungarian state, the property management of the National Trusteeship of Monuments. The rehabilitation began with the renovation of the façade in September 2009. The castle and its park today functions as a museum. Within the framework of the National Castle Program and the National Castle Program, the building was renovated: the paintings were returned to the Hall of Ancestors, the ground floor was reconstructed, and a café and museum shop were created.

== See also ==
- List of castles in Hungary
