= Nádasdladány =

- Location of Fejér county in Hungary

- Location of Nádasdladány
- Coordinates: 47.13405°N 18.23571°E
- Country: Hungary
- County: Fejér

Area
  - Total: 26.35 km^{2} (10.17 sq mi)

Population (2004)
  - Total: 1,872
  - Density: 71.04/km^{2} (184.0/sq mi)
- Time zone: UTC+1 (CET)
  - Summer (DST): UTC+2 (CEST)
- Postal code: 8145
- Area code: 22
- Website: www.nadasdladany.hu

Nádasdladány is a village in Fejér county, Hungary.
