= Ludwig of Bavaria =

Ludwig of Bavaria or Louis of Bavaria may refer to:

== Dukes ==
- Louis I, Duke of Bavaria (1173–1231), Duke of Bavaria in 1183 and the Count of Palatinate of the Rhine in 1214. He was a son of Otto I
- Louis II, Duke of Bavaria (1229–1294), Duke of Bavaria from 1253 and Count Palatine of the Rhine.
- Louis III, Duke of Bavaria, Duke of Lower Bavaria 1290–1296
- Louis IV, Holy Roman Emperor, also known as "Ludwig the Bavarian", (1282–1347) was Duke of Bavaria from 1294 to 1301 together with his brother Rudolf I; Count of the Palatinate until 1329; and German king from 1314. He was crowned as Holy Roman Emperor in 1328
- Louis V, Duke of Bavaria (1315–1361), also called "the Brandenburger", Duke of Bavaria, Margrave of Brandenburg and Count of Tyrol
- Louis VI the Roman (1328–1365), the second son of the Emperor Louis IV. Duke of Bavaria 1347–1365; Margrave of Brandenburg 1351–1365; elector (Kurfürst) of Brandenburg in 1356
- Louis VII, Duke of Bavaria (1365–1447), Duke of Bavaria-Ingolstadt. He was a son of Stephen III
- Louis VIII, Duke of Bavaria (1403–1445), Duke of Bavaria-Ingolstadt from 1443
- Louis IX, Duke of Bavaria (1417–1479), Duke of Bavaria-Landshut from 1450. He was a son of Henry XVI the Rich and Margarete of Austria
- Louis X, Duke of Bavaria (1495–1545), Duke of Bavaria (1516–1545), together with his older brother William IV, Duke of Bavaria. His parents were Albert IV and Kunigunde of Austria, a daughter of Emperor Frederick III

== Kings ==
- Ludwig I of Bavaria (1786–1868) was King of Bavaria from 1825 until the 1848 revolutions in the German states
- Ludwig II of Bavaria (1845–1886), sometimes known as "Mad King Ludwig" and in German as the Märchenkönig (Fairy-tale King), was King of Bavaria from 1864 until his death
- Ludwig III of Bavaria (1845–1921) was the last King of Bavaria from 1913 to 1918

== Others ==
- Prince Ludwig of Bavaria (1913–2008), son of Prince Franz of Bavaria and a grandson of King Ludwig III
- Prince Ludwig of Bavaria (b. 1982), eldest son of Prince Luitpold of Bavaria. He is a great-great-grandson of the last King of Bavaria Ludwig III
