= Prince Franz of Bavaria =

Bavarian general

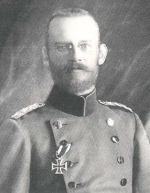
- Photograph, c. 1917
- Born: 10 October 1875; Schloss Leutstetten, Starnberg, Kingdom of Bavaria
- Died: 25 January 1957 (aged 81); Schloss Leutstetten, Starnberg, Bavaria, West Germany
- Burial: St. Michael's Church, Munich, Bavaria.
- Spouse: Princess Isabella Antonie of Croÿ (m. 1912)
- Issue Detail: Prince Ludwig; Princess Maria Elisabeth; Princess Adelgunde Maria; Princess Eleonore Marie; Princess Dorothea Therese; Prince Rasso
- House: Wittelsbach
- Father: Ludwig III of Bavaria
- Mother: Archduchess Maria Theresia of Austria-Este

Prince Franz of Bavaria (German: Franz Maria Luitpold Prinz von Bayern; 10 October 1875 – 25 January 1957) was a member of the royal House of Wittelsbach and a career military officer.

== Early life and military career ==
Prince Franz was born at Schloss Leutstetten in Starnberg, Bavaria, as the third son of King Ludwig III of Bavaria and Archduchess Maria Theresa of Austria-Este. He entered the Bavarian Army as a career officer, initially serving as the commander of the 2. Infanterie-Regiment "Prinz Carl von Bayern". Shortly before the outbreak of World War I, he was given command of the 3. bayerische Infanterie-Brigade, which was later reorganized into the 4. Infanterie-Brigade. Under his leadership, this brigade took part in major Western Front engagements, including operations near Fort Douaumont, the Battle of Passchendaele, and the assault on Kemmelberg.

For his tactical leadership during these operations, he was awarded the Knight's Cross of the Military Order of Max Joseph on 25 May 1916. He was subsequently promoted to command the entire 4. Bayerische Infanterie-Division on 28 October 1916. During the spring offensives of 1918, Prince Franz received the Commander's Cross of the Military Order of Max Joseph on 26 April 1918, followed by Prussia's highest military honor, the Pour le Mérite, on 25 May 1918. After sustaining severe casualties during the Allied counter-offensives on the Somme in the summer of 1918, his division was transferred to the Italian Front for border protection duties, where he remained until the end of the conflict.

== Marriage ==
On 12 July 1912, Prince Franz married Princess Isabella Antonie of Croÿ, daughter of Duke Karl Alfred of Croÿ and Princess Ludmilla of Arenberg.The wedding took place at the Schloss Weilburg in Baden near Vienna, Austria-Hungary. They had six children:

- Prince Ludwig of Bavaria (1913–2008); married Princess Irmingard of Bavaria (1923–2010).
- Princess Maria Elisabeth of Bavaria (1914–2011); married Prince Pedro Henrique of Orléans-Braganza (1909–1981).
- Princess Adelgunde Maria of Bavaria (1917–2004); married Baron Zdenko von Hoenning-O'Carroll (1906–1996).
- Princess Eleonore Marie of Bavaria (1918–2009); married Count Konstantin of Waldburg-Zeil (1909–1972).
- Princess Dorothea Therese of Bavaria (1920–2015); married Archduke Gottfried of Austria (1902–1984). (Note: As German nobility had been constitutionally abolished in 1919, the hereditary titles of descendants of former nobility are unrecognized and instead incorporated into their surnames.)
- Prince Rasso Maximilian Rupprecht of Bavaria (1926–2011); married Theresa of Austria (b. 1931). Rasso and Theresa are the parents of Father Florian.

== Death ==
Prince Franz of Bavaria died on 25 January 1957 at Schloss Leutstetten in Starnberg, Bavaria and is buried in the Colombarium in the Michaelskirche in Munich, Bavaria.

== Decorations and honors ==
Prince Franz received numerous domestic and foreign military honors throughout his career:

Bavaria

- Order of St. Hubertus
- Military Order of Max Joseph, Knight's Cross (1916) and Commander's Cross (1918)
- Military Merit Order, Star to 2nd Class with Swords
- Military Merit Order, 2nd Class with Swords
- Military Merit Order, 3rd Class with Crown
- Jubilee Medal
- Service Distinction Cross 2nd Class, for 25 years' service

Prussia

- Order of the Black Eagle 19.09.1909
- Iron Cross (1914), 1st Class
- Iron Cross (1914), 2nd Class
- Wound Badge (1918) in Black
- Pour le Mérite (25 May 1918)
- Order of the Crown, 2nd Class with Star and Swords
- Royal House Order of Hohenzollern, Honor Cross 1st Class with Swords
- Royal House Order of Hohenzollern, Honor Cross 1st Class

Other German states

- Baden: House Order of Fidelity
- Brunswick: War Merit Cross, 2nd Class
- Hesse-Darmstadt: Ludewig Order
- Lippe: War Honor Cross for Heroic Deeds
- Saxony: Order of the Rue Crown
- Duchies of Saxe-Altenburg, Saxe-Coburg-Gotha and Saxe-Meiningen: Ducal Saxe-Ernestine House Order, Grand Cross
- Württemberg: Order of the Württemberg Crown, Grand Cross

Other countries

- Austria-Hungary: Order of the Golden Fleece
- Austria-Hungary: Royal Hungarian Order of St. Stephen, Grand Cross
- Austria-Hungary: Military Merit Cross, 2nd Class with War Decoration
- Ottoman Empire: Imtiaz Medal in Gold with Swords
- Ottoman Empire: Turkish War Medal ("Gallipoli Star")
- Ottoman Empire: Order of Osminieh, 1st Class

== Ancestry ==
Ancestors of Prince Franz of Bavaria

8. Ludwig I of Bavaria
4. Luitpold, Prince Regent of Bavaria
9. Princess Therese of Saxe-Hildburghausen
2. Ludwig III of Bavaria
10. Leopold II, Grand Duke of Tuscany
5. Archduchess Auguste Ferdinande of Austria
11. Princess Maria Anna of Saxony
1. Prince Franz of Bavaria
12. Francis IV, Duke of Modena
6. Archduke Ferdinand Karl Viktor of Austria-Este
13. Princess Maria Beatrice of Savoy
3. Archduchess Maria Theresa of Austria-Este
14. Archduke Joseph, Palatine of Hungary
7. Archduchess Elisabeth Franziska of Austria
15. Duchess Maria Dorothea of Württemberg

== Bibliography ==
- Adreßhandbuch der Herzogtümer Sachsen-Coburg und Gotha (in German). Gotha: Dietrich. 1914.
- Handbuch über den Königlich Preußischen Hof und Staat für das Jahr 1918 (in German). Berlin: Decker's Verlag. 1918.
- Hildebrand, Karl-Friedrich (1999). Die Ritter des Ordens Pour le Mérite des I. Weltkriegs, Band 1: A–G (in German). Osnabrück: Biblio Verlag. ISBN 3-7648-2505-7.
