= Princess Isabella Antonie of Croÿ =

Princess of Croÿ and Princess of Bavaria (1890–1982)

Princess Isabella Antonie
- Princess Franz of Bavaria
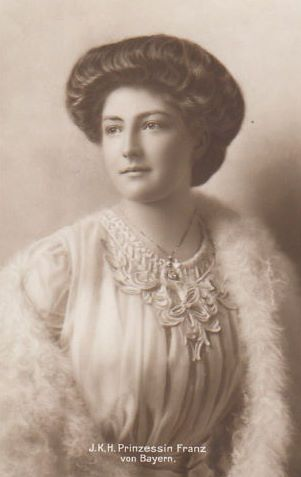
- Photo in 1912
- Born: 24 October 1890; Bayreuth, Kingdom of Bavaria
- Died: 30 March 1982 (aged 91); Starnberg, Bavaria, West Germany
- Burial: St. Michael's Church, Munich, Bavaria
- Spouse: Prince Franz of Bavaria (m. 1912; died 1957)
- Issue: Prince Ludwig of Bavaria; Princess Maria Elisabeth of Bavaria; Princess Adelgunde of Bavaria; Princess Eleonore Therese of Bavaria; Princess Dorothea of Bavaria; Prince Rasso of Bavaria
Names
- Isabella Antonie Eleonore Natalie Clementine
- House: House of Croÿ
- Father: Karl Alfred, 12th Duke of Croÿ
- Mother: Princess Ludmilla of Arenberg

Princess Isabella Antonie of Croÿ (24 October 1890 – 30 March 1982) was a member of the princely House of Croÿ and, by marriage to Prince Franz of Bavaria, a princess of the House of Wittelsbach.

== Early life ==
Princess Isabella Antonie was born at Bayreuth, Kingdom of Bavaria the eldest daughter of Karl Alfred, 12th Duke of Croÿ, and Princess Ludmilla of Arenberg. Her family belonged to the House of Croÿ, a mediatised noble house of the Holy Roman Empire.

== Marriage and family ==
On 8 July 1912, Isabella Antonie married Prince Franz of Bavaria, the third son of King Ludwig III of Bavaria.The wedding took place at the Schloss Weilburg in Baden near Vienna, Austria-Hungary.The marriage produced six children:

- Prince Ludwig of Bavaria (1913–2008); married Princess Irmingard of Bavaria and had issue.
- Princess Maria Elisabeth of Bavaria (1914–2011); married Prince Pedro Henrique of Orléans-Braganza and had issue.
- Princess Adelgunde of Bavaria (1917–2004); married Baron Gottfried von Hoenning O'Carroll and had issue.
- Princess Eleonore Therese of Bavaria (1918–2009); married Count Konstantin of Waldburg-Zeil and had issue.
- Princess Dorothea of Bavaria (1920–2015); married Archduke Gottfried of Austria and had issue.
- Prince Rasso of Bavaria (1926–2011); married Archduchess Theresa of Austria and had issue.

== Later life ==
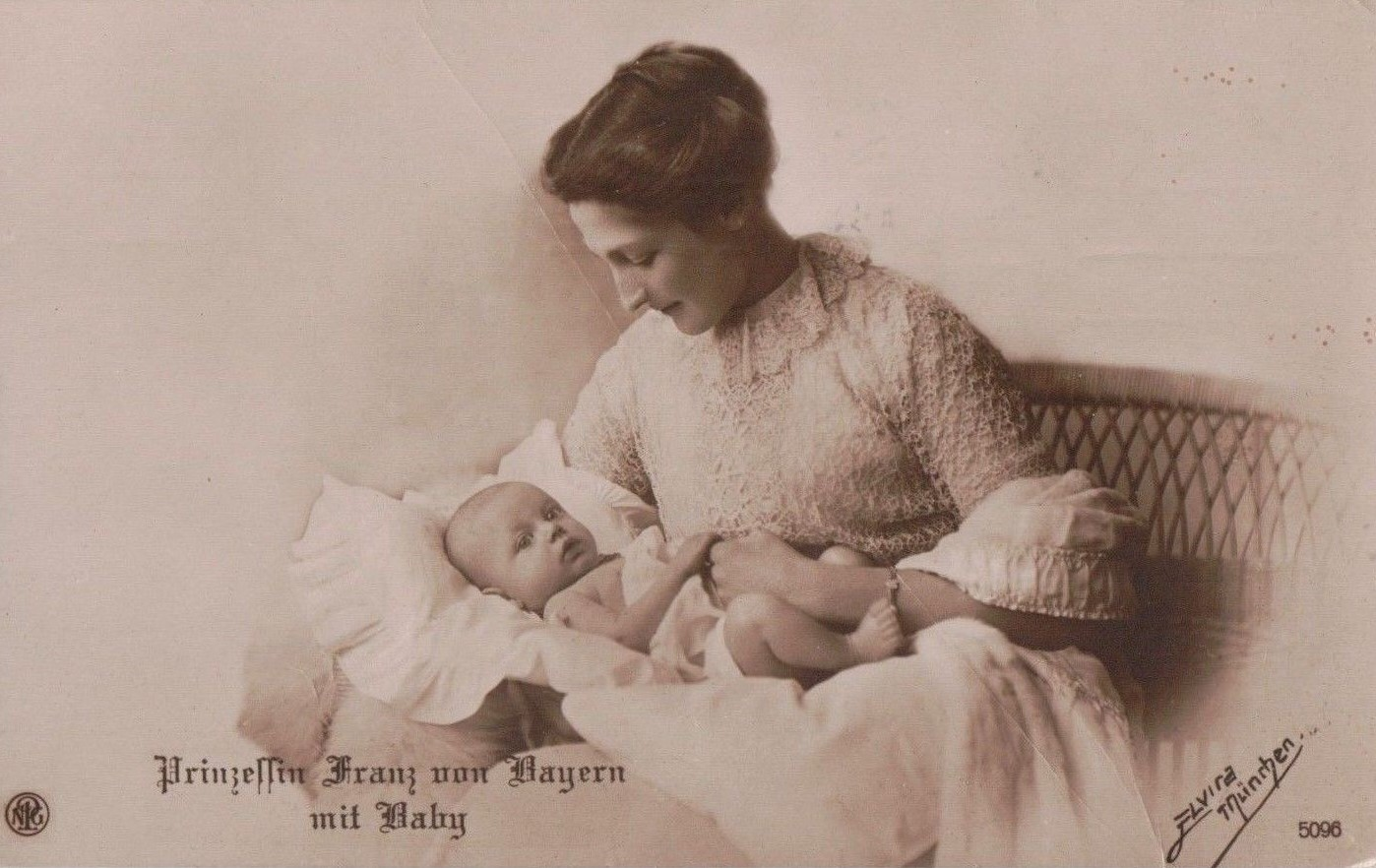
Princess Isabella Antonie with her firstborn child in 1913

Following the fall of the Kingdom of Bavaria in 1918, Isabella Antonie lived with her family at Schloss Leutstetten. She remained a prominent figure within the Wittelsbach family until her death in Starnberg at the age of 91. She was interred at St. Michael's Church, Munich

== Ancestry ==
Ancestors of Princess Isabella Antonie of Croÿ

8. Alfred, 10th Duke of Croÿ
4. Rudolf, 11th Duke of Croÿ
9. Princess Eleonore of Salm-Salm
2. Karl Alfred, 12th Duke of Croÿ
10. Eugène, 8th Prince of Ligne
5. Princess Natalie of Ligne
11. Nathalie de Trazegnies
1. Princess Isabella Antonie of Croÿ
12. Prosper Louis, 7th Duke of Arenberg
6. Engelbert, 8th Duke of Arenberg
13. Ludmilla, Princess of Lobkowicz
3. Princess Ludmilla of Arenberg
14. Prince Ernst of Arenberg
7. Princess Eleonore of Arenberg
15. Princess Sophie of Auersperg

== Bibliography ==
- Almanach de Gotha: Annuaire Généalogique, Diplomatique et Statistique. Gotha: Justus Perthes, 1915. ISSN 0065-6542.
- Genealogisches Handbuch des Adels, Fürstliche Häuser. Vol. II. Glücksburg/Lahn: C.A. Starke Verlag, 1953. ISBN 978-3798007000.
- Bayerische Staatsbibliothek. Hof- und Staats-Handbuch des Königreichs Bayern. Munich: R. Oldenbourg, 1914.
- Brook-Shepherd, Gordon. The Last Habsburg. New York: Weybright and Talley, 1968. ISBN 978-0297176527.
- Lodge, Edmund. The Peerage and Baronetage of the British Empire. London: Hurst and Blackett, 1907.
