= Archduke Gottfried of Austria =

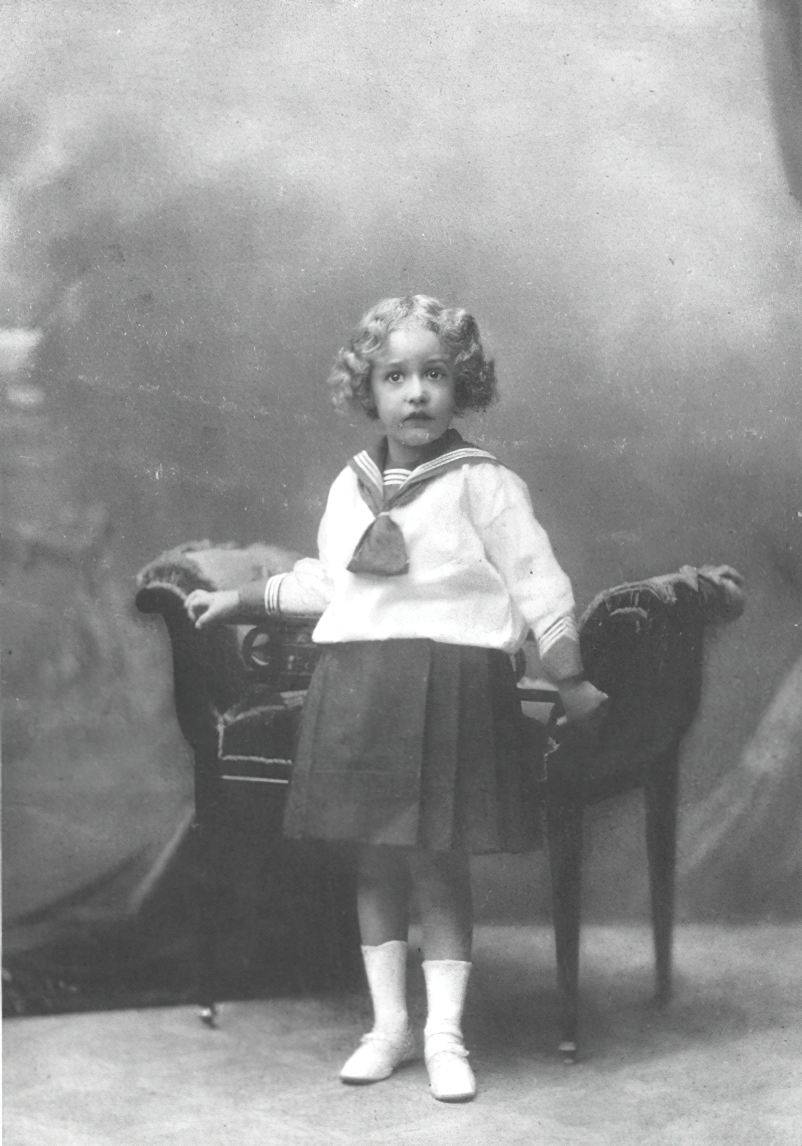
- Gottfried as a child, c. 1900s

Head of the House of Habsburg-Tuscany
- Reign: 8 November 1948 – 21 January 1984
- Predecessor: Archduke Peter Ferdinand
- Successor: Archduke Leopold Franz
- Born: 14 March 1902; Linz, Upper Austria, Austria-Hungary
- Died: 21 January 1984 (aged 81); Bad Ischl, Upper Austria, Austria
- Spouse: Princess Dorothea of Bavaria (m. 1938)
- Issue Detail: Archduchess Elisabeth; Archduchess Alice; Archduke Leopold Franz; Archduchess Maria Antoinette
Names
- German: Gottfried Maria Joseph Peter Ferdinand Hubert Anton Rupert Leopold Heinrich Ignaz Alfons
- House: Habsburg-Lorraine
- Father: Archduke Peter Ferdinand of Austria
- Mother: Princess Maria Cristina of Bourbon-Two Sicilies

Archduke Gottfried of Austria (German: Gottfried Maria Joseph Peter Ferdinand Hubert Anton Rupert Leopold Heinrich Ignaz Alfons, Erzherzog von Österreich, Prinz von Toskana; 14 March 1902 – 21 January 1984), also styled as Gottfried Erzherzog von Österreich, was an Archduke of Austria and claimant to the defunct throne of the Grand Duchy of Tuscany.

== Biography ==
On 20 December 1866, Goffredo's grandfather, Ferdinando IV, the last Grand Duke of Tuscany, and his children were readmitted to the imperial family. The House of Tuscany ceased to exist as a sovereign branch and merged with the Austrian imperial house. Ferdinand was able to maintain his fons honorum vita natural durante, while his children became only imperial princes (archdukes of Austria) and no longer princes/princesses of Tuscany. The Grand Magistry of the Order of St Stephen died out with the death of Ferdinand IV. In fact, after the death of Grand Duke Ferdinand IV in 1908, Emperor Franz Joseph I forbade the acceptance of the title of Grand Duke or Prince or Princess of Tuscany: none of Ferdinand IV's children born after 1866 accepted the title of Prince or Grand Duke of Tuscany. They were also unable to legitimately take possession of the extinct dynastic orders, previously conferred by the Grand Dukes of Tuscany.

While his grandfather had kept the title of Grand Duke of Tuscany after the abolition of the dukedom in 1860, he had abdicated it in favor of the Austrian Emperor in 1870. Peter Ferdinand, Goffredo's father, never claimed the title of Grand Duke of Tuscany. The former Prime Minister of Saxony and later Imperial and Household Minister Beust declared: "The Tuscan Grand Ducal family has lost its sovereign rights as a result of political events. This branch of the Austrian imperial family is therefore naturally subordinate to the rights and duties of all other members of the imperial family. The Grand Dukes Leopold and Ferdinand and their more famous brothers are therefore from now on to be considered only as Archdukes of Austria and to be treated in accordance with the Statute of the High Noble Family of 3 February 1839."

== Family ==
Gottfried was born in Linz, Austria-Hungary, the eldest child and son of Archduke Peter Ferdinand of Austria and his wife Princess Maria Cristina of Bourbon-Two Sicilies. Gottfried was raised with his three siblings in Salzburg and Vienna until the end of World War I in 1918, when his family emigrated to Lucerne, Switzerland. He died in Bad Ischl, aged 81.

== Marriage and issue ==
Gottfried married Princess Dorothea of Bavaria, fifth child and fourth daughter of Prince Franz of Bavaria and his wife Princess Isabella Antonie of Croÿ, on 2 August 1938 civilly and religiously on 3 August 1938 in Sárvár, Kingdom of Hungary. Around 1970, in violation of the decree of Emperor Franz Joseph I of 1866 and ignoring the abdication of his grandfather last Grand Duke of Tuscany Ferdinand IV signed in Lindau on Lake Constance in 1870, he assumed the title of Grand Duke of Tuscany without the permission of the head of the imperial and royal house. Gottfried and Dorothea had issue:

- Archduchess Elisabeth of Austria, Princess of Tuscany (born 2 October 1939 in Achberg), married on 28 April 1965 in Salzburg, Friedrich Hubert Edler von Braun (born 26 December 1934 in Regensburg), son of Erich Edler von Braun and Baroness Elisabeth von Teuchert-Kauffmann und Traunsteinburg. They had three children:
  - Bernadette Edle von Braun (born 21 July 1966 in Bad Godesberg), she has illegitimate son David
  - Dominik Edler von Braun (born 21 September 1967 in Bad Godesberg), married on 25 August 1995 in New York City, Countess Tatiana Angela von Nayhauss-Cormons (born 5 May 1968 in Munich), daughter of Count Mainhardt von Nayhauss-Cormons and Sabine Beirlein. They have three children:
    - Justus Edler von Braun (born 15 May 2003 in Bonn)
    - Ludovic Edler von Braun (born 20 September 2005 in Bonn)
    - Edina Edler von Braun (born 15 November 2007 in Bonn)
  - Felix Edler von Braun (born 23 April 1970 in Bad Ischl), married on 27 May 2006 in Berlin, Gabrielle Hinzmann (born 15 August 1972 in Berlin). They have one daughter:
    - Stella Edler von Braun (born in 2009)
- Archduchess Alice of Austria, Princess of Tuscany (born 29 April 1941 in Leutstetten), married on 7 May 1970 in Salzburg, Baron Vittorio Manno (born 31 July 1938 in Cuneo), son of Baron Antonio Manno and Bonile Maria Asinari di Rossillon. They had three children:
  - Leopoldo dei baroni Manno (19 February 1971 in The Hague — 21 February 1971 in The Hague)
  - Baron Niccolò Manno (born 1 November 1977 in Maisons-Laffitte), married on 22 May 2004 in London, Manon Sybille Duflos. They had three sons:
    - Arturo dei baroni Manno (born 24 June 2009)
    - Paolo dei baroni Manno (born 18 April 2012)
    - Alessio dei baroni Manno (born 31 August 2014)
  - Domitilla dei baroni Manno (born 30 April 1974 in Neuilly-sur-Seine), married on 24 April 1999 in Salzburg, Pierre-Emmanuel Derriks (born 30 August 1973 in Ixelles), son of Michel Derriks and Anne Mottard. They had four children:
    - Felicie Derriks (born 27 July 1998 in Salzburg)
    - Ombeline Derriks (born 29 February 2000 in Munich)
    - Fleur Derriks (born 28 March 2003)
    - Corentin Derriks (born 16 March 2005)
- Archduke Leopold of Austria, Prince and later titular Grand Duke of Tuscany (born 25 October 1942 in Leutstetten - died 23 June 2021), married on 19 June 1965 in St. Gilgen, Laetitia de Belzunce d'Arenberg (born 2 September 1941 in Brummana), daughter of Henry de Belzunce and Marie-Thérèse de la Poëze d'Harambure. They had two sons.
  - Archduke Sigismund Otto Maria Josef Gottfried Heinrich Erik Leopold Ferdinand of Austria, Prince and later Grand Duke of Tuscany, Ambassador of the Sovereign Military Order of Malta to Uruguay, (born Lausanne 21 Apr 1966); married London 11 September 1999 (divorced 2013, canonically annulled), Elyssa Edmonstone (born Glasgow 11 Sep 1973), daughter of Sir Archibald Bruce Edmondstone, of Duntreath, 7th Baronet and the former Juliet Elizabeth Deakin, with three children.
    - Archduke Leopold Amedeo Peter Ferdinand Archibald of Austria, Grand Prince of Tuscany (born 2001).
    - Archduchess Tatyana Maria Theresa Letitia Juliet of Austria, Princess of Tuscany (born 2003).
    - Archduke Stefano Sigismund William Bruce Erik Leopold of Austria, Prince of Tuscany (born 2004).
  - Archduke Guntram Maria Josef of Austria, Prince of Tuscany (born Montevideo 21 July 1967), married (non-dynastic) Cuernavaca, Mexico 13 April 1966 (religious) 19 May 1996 Deborah de Sola, Countess von Habsburg, and has two children.
    - Countess Anna Faustian von Hobsburg (born 2001).
    - Count Tiziano Leopold von Habsburg (born 2004).
- Archduchess Maria Antoinette of Austria, Princess of Tuscany (born 16 September 1950 in St. Gilgen), married on 13 April 1974 in St. Gilgen, Baron Hans Walter von Proff zu Irnich (born 7 March 1938 in Munich), son of Oskar Natterman and Margarete Wutt, adopted by his stepfather Baron Max von Proff zu Irnich. They have two children:
  - Baron Maximilian von Proff zu Irnich (born 24 February 1976 in Munich), married on 29 May 2010, Baroness Sidonia von Ledebur (born 5 November 1978 in Darmstadt), daughter of Baron Ernst von Ledebur and Alix von Watzdorf. They have one son:
    - Baron Cornelius von Proff zu Irnich (born 11 August 2011)
  - Baroness Johanna von Proff zu Irnich (born 27 June 1979 in Munich), married on 1 October 2011 in Starnberg, Florian Prechtl. They have two children:
    - Franz Prechtl (born in January 2013)
    - A child (born in 2015)

== Honours ==
- Knight of the Austrian Order of the Golden Fleece

== Ancestry ==
Ancestors of Archduke Gottfried of Austria

16. Ferdinand III, Grand Duke of Tuscany
8. Leopold II, Grand Duke of Tuscany
17. Princess Luisa of Naples and Sicily
4. Ferdinand IV, Grand Duke of Tuscany
18. Francis I of the Two Sicilies
9. Princess Maria Antonia of the Two Sicilies
19. Infanta Maria Isabella of Spain
2. Archduke Peter Ferdinand of Austria
20. Charles II, Duke of Parma
10. Charles III, Duke of Parma
21. Princess Maria Teresa of Savoy
5. Princess Alice of Bourbon-Parma
22. Prince Charles Ferdinand, Duke of Berry
11. Princess Louise of Artois
23. Princess Marie Caroline of Naples and Sicily
1. Archduke Gottfried of Austria
24. Francis I of the Two Sicilies (= 18)
12. Ferdinand II of the Two Sicilies
25. Infanta Maria Isabella of Spain (= 19)
6. Prince Alfonso, Count of Caserta
26. Archduke Charles, Duke of Teschen
13. Archduchess Maria Theresa of Austria
27. Princess Henrietta of Nassau-Weilburg
3. Princess Maria Cristina of Bourbon-Two Sicilies
28. Francis I of the Two Sicilies (= 18, 24)
14. Prince Francis, Count of Trapani
29. Infanta Maria Isabella of Spain (= 19, 25)
7. Princess Maria Antonietta of Bourbon-Two Sicilies
30. Leopold II, Grand Duke of Tuscany (= 8)
15. Archduchess Maria Isabella of Austria
31. Princess Maria Antonia of the Two Sicilies (= 9)
