= Irmingard Prinzessin von Bayern =

Bavarian princess

Princess Irmingard
- Princess of Bavaria
- Princess Irmingard
- Born: 29 May 1923; Schloss Berchtesgaden, Weimar Republic
- Died: 23 October 2010 (aged 87); Schloss Leutstetten, Starnberg, Germany
- Burial: Andechs Abbey
- Spouse: Prince Ludwig of Bavaria (m. 1950; died 2008)
- Issue: Prince Luitpold of Bavaria; Princess Maria of Bavaria; Princess Philippa of Bavaria
Names
- Irmingard Marie Josefa
- House: Wittelsbach
- Father: Rupprecht, Crown Prince of Bavaria
- Mother: Princess Antonia of Luxembourg

Irmingard Prinzessin von Bayern (29 May 1923 – 23 October 2010) was the daughter of Rupprecht, Crown Prince of Bavaria and his second wife, Princess Antonia of Luxembourg. She was a half-sister of Albrecht, Duke of Bavaria.

== Life ==
Irmingard was born at her father's residence, Schloss Berchtesgaden. She spent her childhood between Berchtesgaden and the family's other residences, the Leuchtenberg Palais in Munich, Schloss Leutstetten, and Schloss Hohenschwangau. In 1936 she was sent to England for education at the Convent of the Sacred Heart in Roehampton (later Woldingham School), where several of her Luxembourg cousins were also enrolled.

In early 1940 Irmingard and her siblings were allowed to travel to Italy to join their father, who had left Germany to avoid conflict with the Nazi authorities. She spent much of the remainder of the war in Rome, Florence, and Padua.

In September 1944 Irmingard was arrested by the Nazis, who had been unable to locate her father. She fell ill with typhus and was taken to a prison hospital in Innsbruck. After recovering, she was imprisoned at Sachsenhausen, where other members of her family who had been arrested were reunited with her. They were later transferred to the concentration camps at Flossenbürg and Dachau, and were liberated by the U.S. Third Army on 30 April 1945.

After the war Irmingard and her sisters sought refuge in Luxembourg, where their maternal aunt, Grand Duchess Charlotte, reigned. Following a brief return to Germany, she spent a year in the United States, where her uncle Prince Adolf of Schwarzenberg owned a ranch in Montana.

== Marriage and children ==
On 20 July 1950 Irmingard married her first cousin Prince Ludwig of Bavaria (22 June 1913 – 17 October 2008), son of Prince Franz of Bavaria and Princess Isabella Antonie of Croÿ. The civil ceremony took place at Leutstetten, and the religious ceremony was held the following day at Schloss Nymphenburg in Munich.

The couple had three children; two daughters died in infancy:

- Prince Luitpold of Bavaria (born 14 April 1951 in Leutstetten).
- Princess Maria of Bavaria (3 January 1953 — 3 January 1953).
- Princess Philippa of Bavaria (26 June 1954 — 26 June 1954).

After her father's death in 1955, Irmingard and her husband moved into Schloss Leutstetten, where she continued to live after her husband's death in 2008.

== Ancestry ==
Ancestors of Irmingard Prinzessin von Bayern

8. Luitpold, Prince Regent of Bavaria
4. Ludwig III of Bavaria
9. Archduchess Augusta of Austria
2. Rupprecht, Crown Prince of Bavaria
10. Archduke Ferdinand Karl Viktor of Austria-Este
5. Maria Theresia of Austria-Este
11. Archduchess Elisabeth Franziska of Austria
1. Princess Irmingard of Bavaria
12. Adolphe, Grand Duke of Luxembourg
6. William IV, Grand Duke of Luxembourg
13. Princess Adelheid-Marie of Anhalt-Dessau
3. Princess Antonia of Luxembourg
14. Miguel I of Portugal
7. Infanta Marie Anne of Portugal
15. Adelaide of Löwenstein-Wertheim-Rosenberg
