= Prince Ludwig of Bavaria (1913–2008) =

Bavarian prince

Prince Ludwig
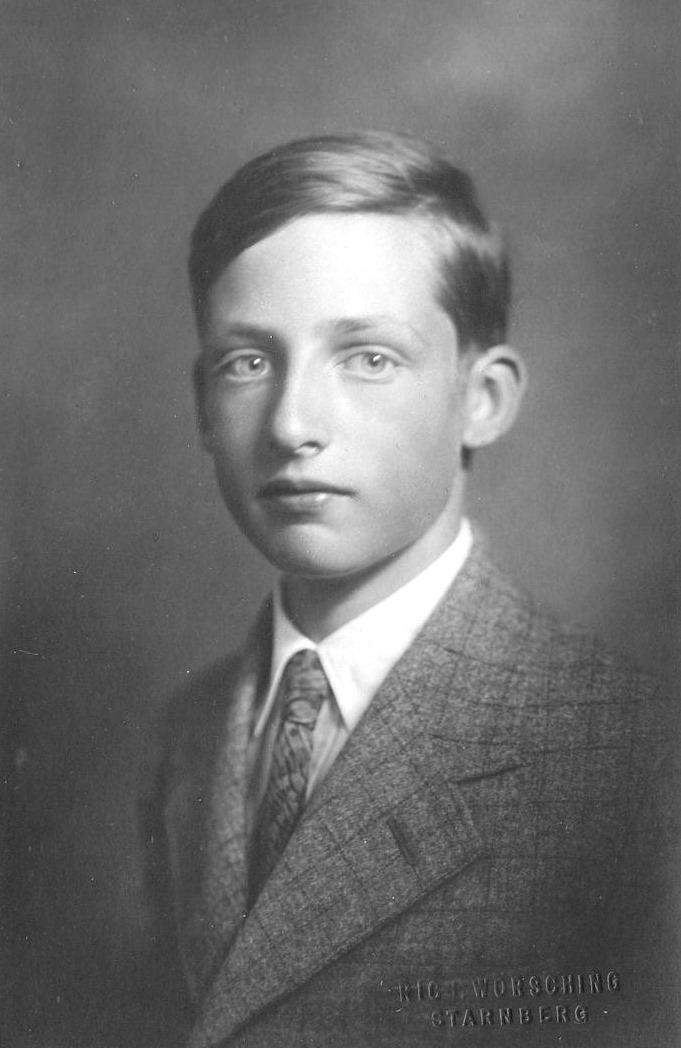
- Ludwig in the late 1920s
- Born: 22 June 1913; Nymphenburg Palace, Munich, Kingdom of Bavaria
- Died: 17 October 2008 (aged 95); Schloss Leutstetten, Starnberg, Bavaria, Germany
- Burial: Andechs Abbey cemetery, Bavaria
- Spouse: Princess Irmingard of Bavaria (m. 1950)
- Issue: Prince Luitpold; Princess Irmingard Maria; Princess Philippa
Names
- German: Ludwig Karl Maria Anton Joseph Prinz von Bayern
- House: Wittelsbach
- Father: Prince Franz of Bavaria
- Mother: Princess Isabella Antonie of Croÿ

Prince Ludwig of Bavaria (22 June 1913 – 17 October 2008) was a German prince of the House of Wittelsbach, a member of the former ruling royal family of Bavaria. He was the son of Prince Franz of Bavaria and Princess Isabella Antonie of Croÿ, and a descendant of one of Europe’s oldest dynasties.

Through his marriage to Princess Irmingard of Bavaria in 1950, Prince Ludwig became part of the senior line of the Wittelsbach family. He was the father of Prince Luitpold of Bavaria and played a representative role within the Bavarian royal house in the post-monarchical era.

== Early life ==
Prince Ludwig was born at Nymphenburg Palace, Munich, Kingdom of Bavaria. He was the eldest son of Prince Franz of Bavaria, the third son of King Ludwig III, and his wife Princess Isabella Antonie of Croÿ. After graduating from the Maximilians-Gymnasium (located in Schwabing, Munich), Ludwig studied forestry at the university in Hungary. In 1939, as most young German men of his age, he was drafted into the military, serving as a Gebirgsjäger. However, his career in the German Army was short lived. In early 1941, Ludwig was relieved from all combat duties as a result of the Prinzenerlass which prohibited members of Germany's royal houses from participating in military operations. He spent the rest of the war at Sarvar in Hungary where his family owned a castle. In 1945, his family fled Hungary and settled at Leutstetten near Starnberg in Bavaria.

== Marriage and issue ==
On 19 July 1950, Ludwig married his first cousin Princess Irmingard of Bavaria (29 May 1923 in Berchtesgaden – 23 October 2010 in Leutstetten), daughter of Crown Prince Rupprecht of Bavaria and Princess Antonia of Luxembourg. The civil wedding took place at Leutstetten, and the religious ceremony followed a day later at Schloss Nymphenburg in Munich. The couple had three children:

- Prince Luitpold of Bavaria (born 14 April 1951 in Leutstetten), married to Katrin Beatrix Wiegand from 1979 to 1999. They had five children.
- Princess Maria of Bavaria (born and died 3 January 1953)
- Princess Philippa of Bavaria (born and died 26 June 1954)

== Later life ==
After the death of Crown Prince Rupprecht of Bavaria in 1955, Ludwig and Irmingard moved into Schloss Leutstetten, where Irmingard continued to live. Ludwig was a Grand Prior of the Bavarian Order of Saint George, a Knight of the Order of Saint Hubert, and from 1960 a Knight of the Order of the Golden Fleece.

Ludwig died of pneumonia at Schloss Leutstetten, 17 October 2008, at the age of 95. On Wednesday, 22 October at 10:00 a.m., a Funeral Liturgy was held in the abbey church at Andechs. After the Mass, his body was buried in the Wittelsbach cemetery on the abbey grounds.

== Ancestry ==
Ancestors of Prince Ludwig of Bavaria (1913–2008)

16. Ludwig I of Bavaria
8. Luitpold, Prince Regent of Bavaria
17. Therese of Saxe-Hildburghausen
4. Ludwig III of Bavaria
18. Leopold II, Grand Duke of Tuscany
9. Archduchess Auguste Ferdinande of Austria
19. Princess Maria Anna of Saxony
2. Prince Franz of Bavaria
20. Francis IV, Duke of Modena
10. Archduke Ferdinand Karl Viktor of Austria-Este
21. Maria Beatrice of Savoy
5. Maria Theresa of Austria-Este
22. Archduke Joseph, Palatine of Hungary
11. Archduchess Elisabeth Franziska of Austria
23. Duchess Maria Dorothea of Württemberg
1. Prince Ludwig of Bavaria
24. Alfred, Duke of Croÿ
12. Rudolf, Duke of Croÿ
25. Princess Eleonore of Salm-Salm
6. Karl Alfred, Duke of Croÿ
26. Eugène, Prince of Ligne
13. Princess Natalie of Ligne
27. Nathalie de Trazegnies
3. Princess Isabella Antonie of Croÿ
28. Prosper Louis, Duke of Arenberg
14. Engelbert, Duke of Arenberg
29. Princess Maria Ludmila of Lobkowicz
7. Princess Ludmilla of Arenberg
30. Ernest, Prince of Arenberg
15. Princess Éléonore of Arenberg
31. Princess Sophie of Auersperg
