= Schloss Weilburg =

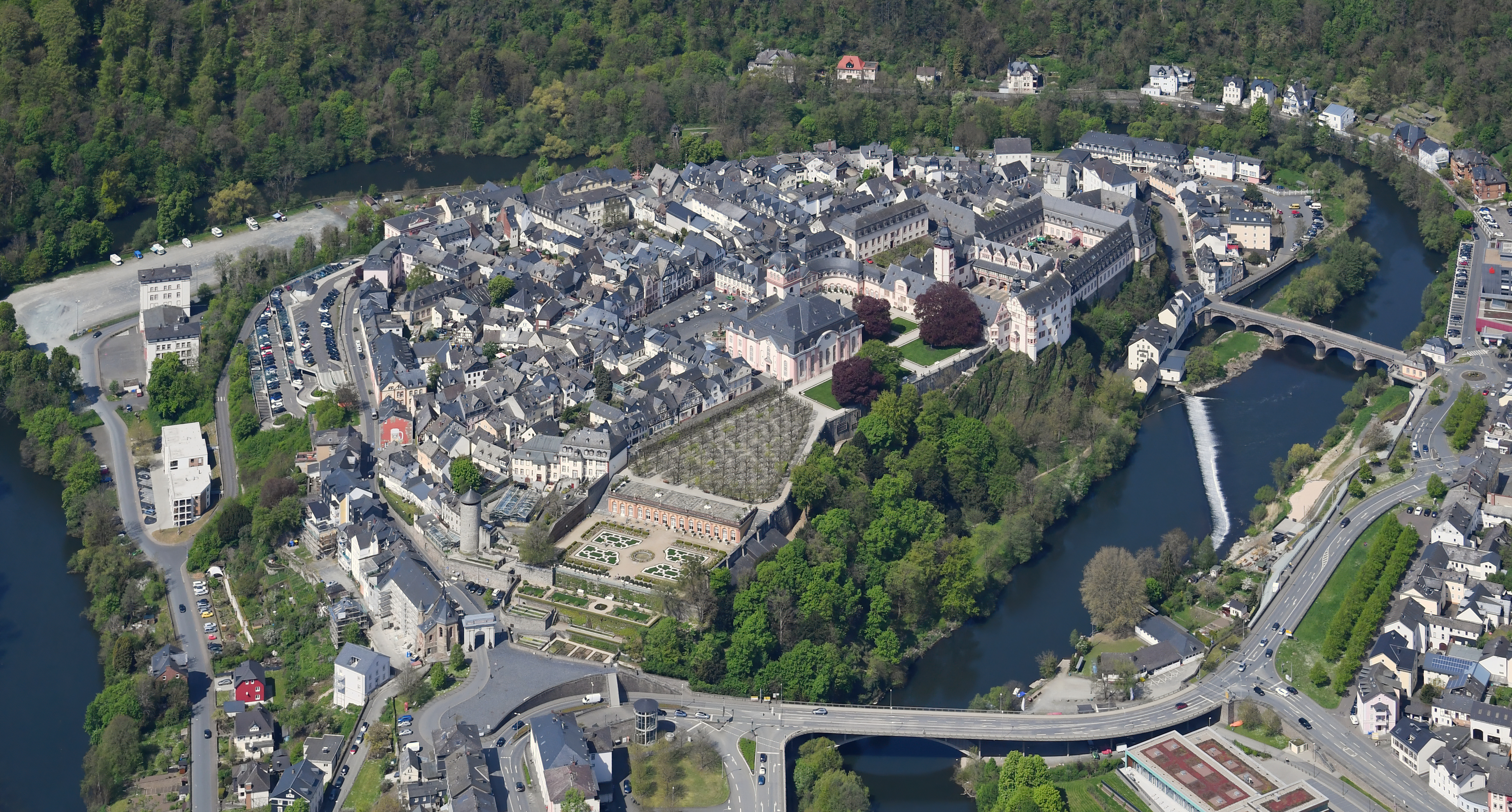
- Aerial view of the palace and its church and gardens above the Lahn river (from the southeast)

General information
- Status: Museum
- Location: Weilburg, Hesse, Germany
- Coordinates: 50.4854°N 8.2611°E
- Construction started: 1530
- Completed: 1772

Schloss Weilburg (Weilburg Palace) is a Baroque Schloss in Weilburg, Hesse, Germany. It is located on a spur above the river Lahn and occupies about half of the area of the Old Town of Weilburg. It contains the Hochschloss ("High Palace"), built between 1530 and 1572, which is one of the best-preserved Renaissance palaces in Hesse. In the 1700s, the palace was expanded by John Ernst, Count of Nassau-Weilburg, and his builder, Julius Ludwig Rothweil. The buildings and gardens now belong to the Verwaltung der Staatlichen Schlösser und Gärten Hessen, and they can be visited as a museum on guided tours. Parts of the palace are venues for the music festival Weilburger Schlosskonzerte, which is named after the palace.

== History ==
=== Renaissance palace ===
The 1359 Gothic castle was demolished to make way for the Renaissance buildings. The Renaissance buildings are now called the Hochschloss (high palace). They form a square around a 40-by-34-metre (131 ft × 112 ft) central courtyard (Renaissancehof). Construction was begun by Philip III, Count of Nassau-Weilburg. The east wing (also called the Neuer Bau or "New Building") was built first, by architect Nikolaus Schickedanz, from about 1530 to 1539. It incorporates some pieces of the old Gothic castle. The west and south wings were built from 1540 to 1545 by architect Balthasar Wolf. The west wing was formerly the stables but became the kitchens in the 1700s. The north wing was built last, from 1560 to 1572, by architect Ludwig Kempf. It has "Dutch"-style dormers and a "Venetian"-style arcade of Ionic twinned columns. Some alterations were made in 1661, including half-timbered dormers and an additional gate.

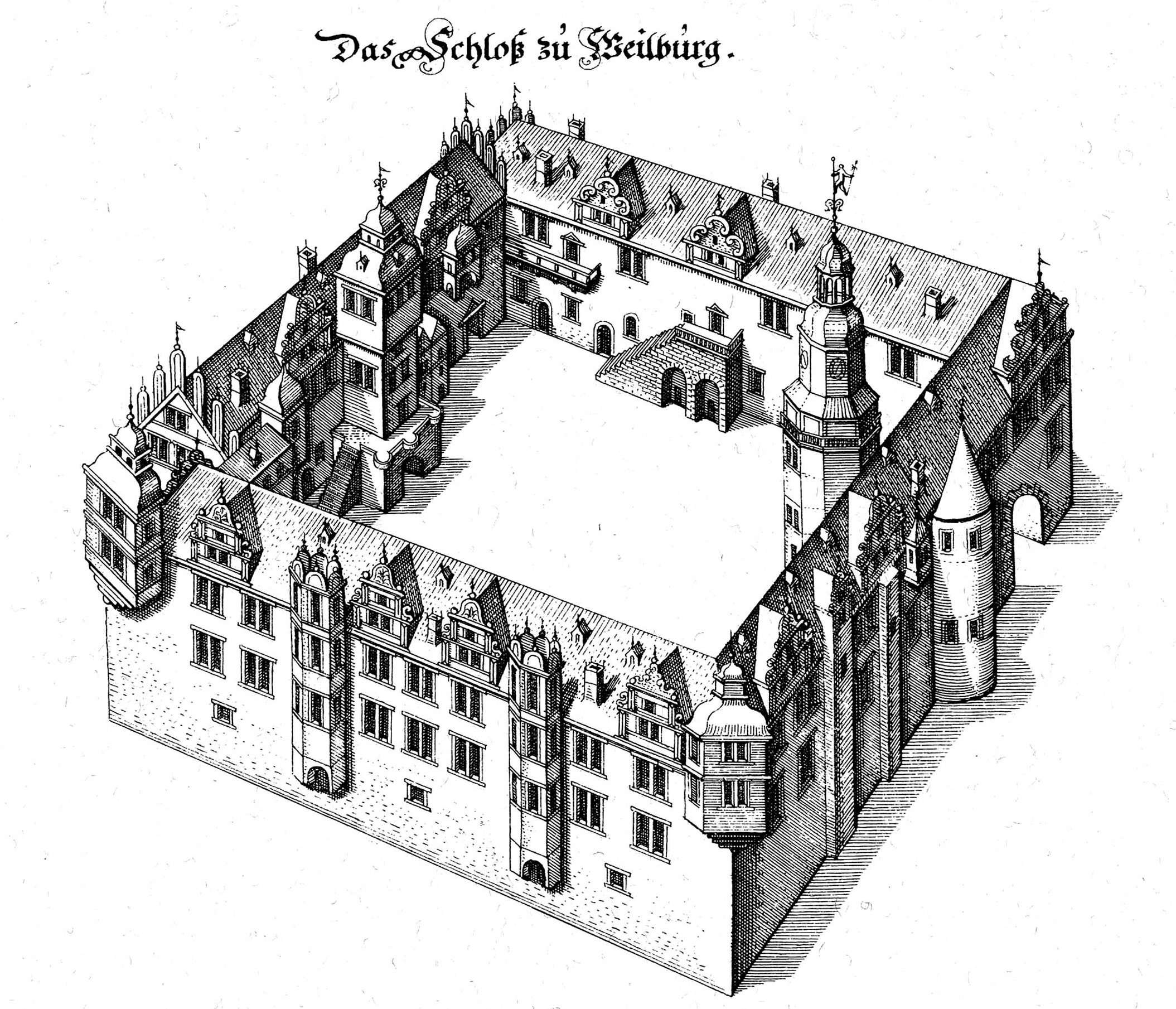
Detail of engraving of the Renaissance palace by Matthäus Merian, 1655, view looking southeast

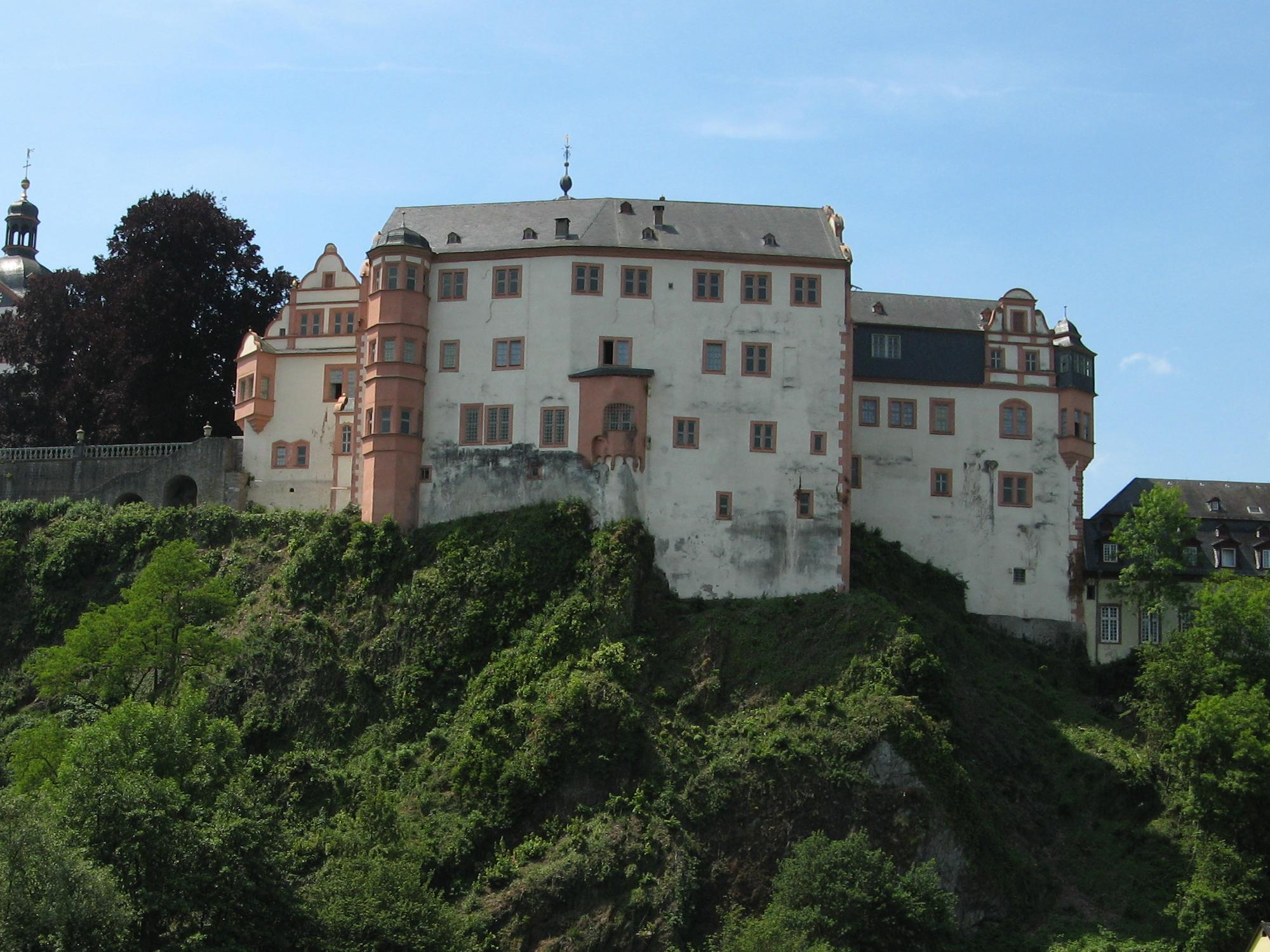
Outside of the east wing of the Renaissance palace, overlooking the Lahn river. This facade was raised and simplified in 1661.

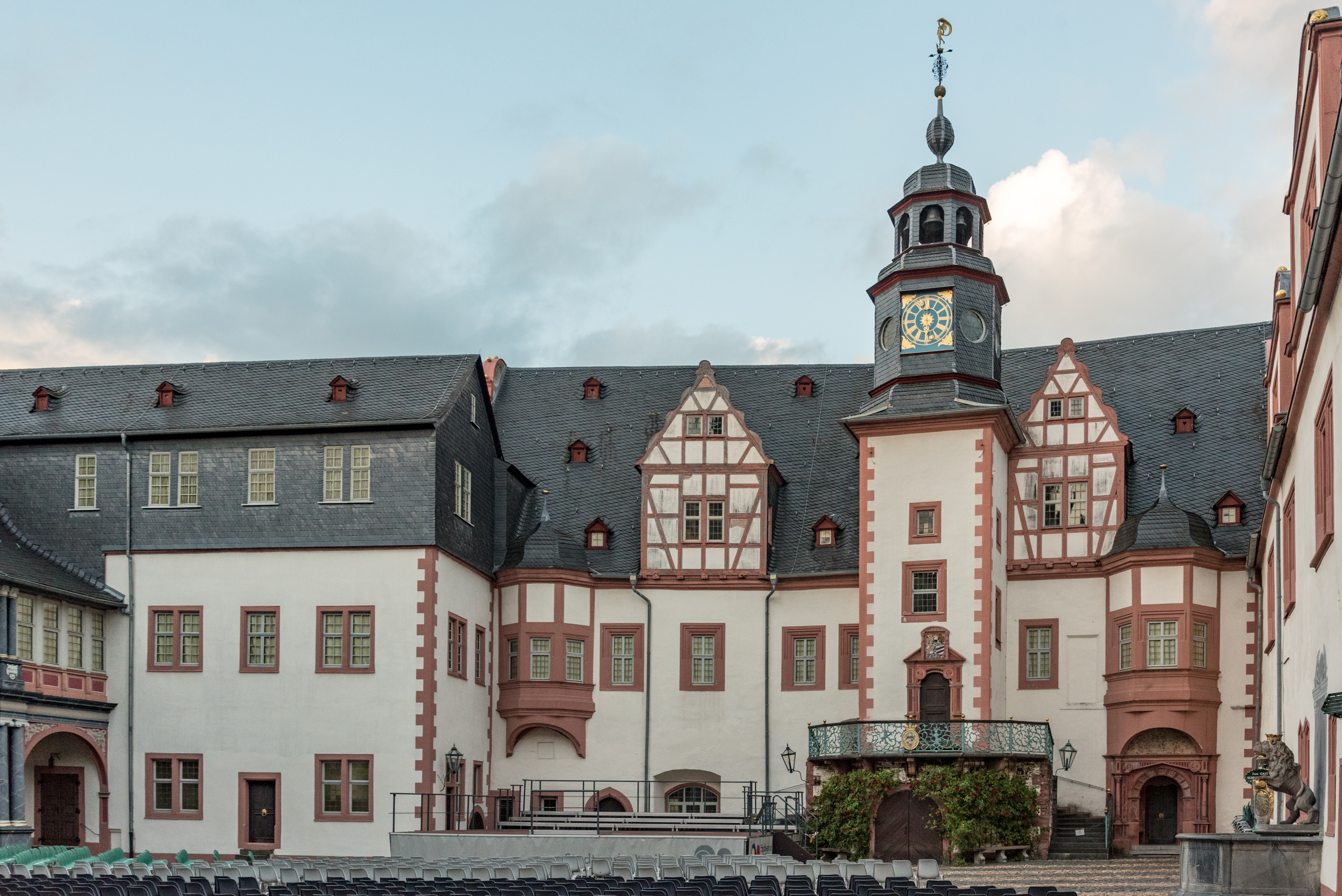
The same east wing from inside the Renaissance courtyard, with clocktower

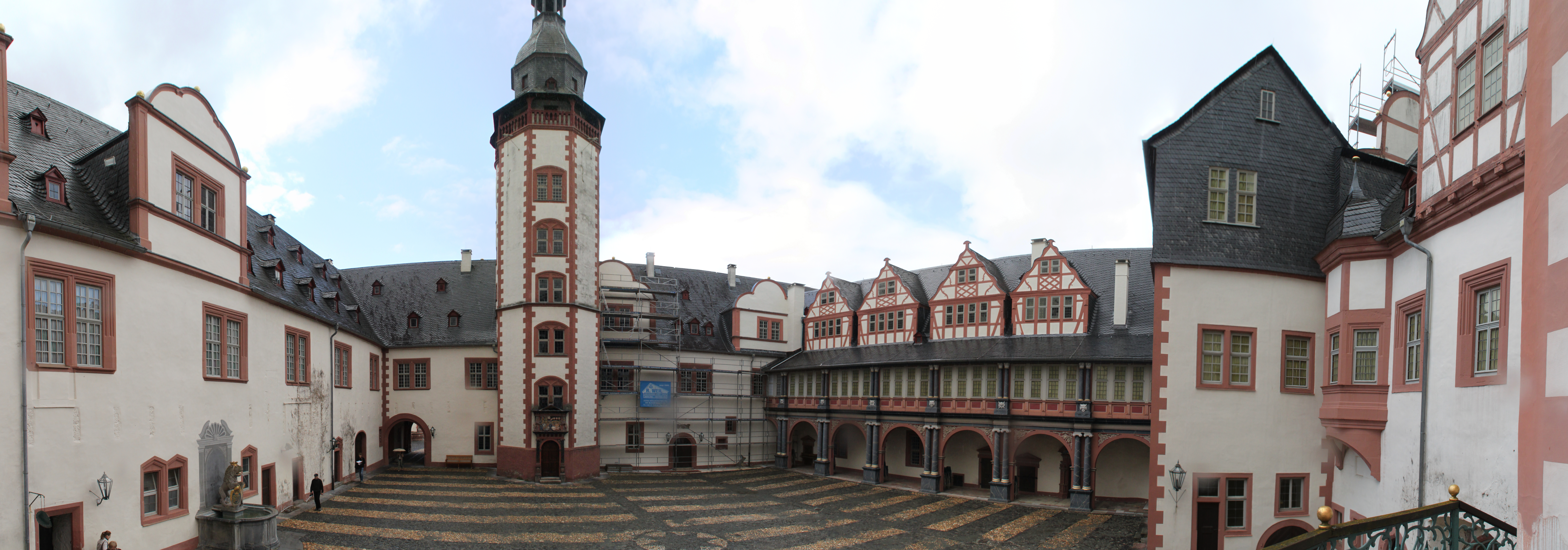
Panorama of the courtyard, taken from the clocktower

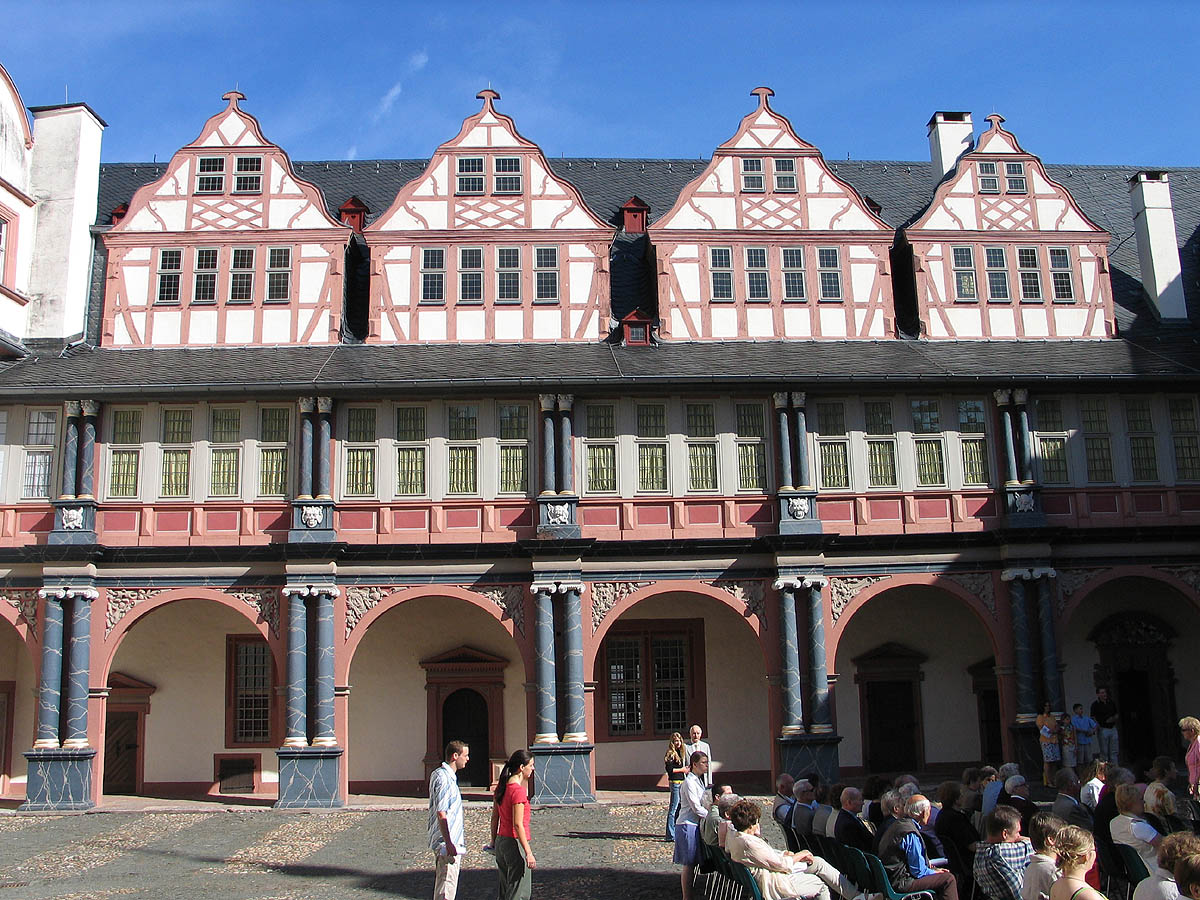
The north side of the Renaissance courtyard

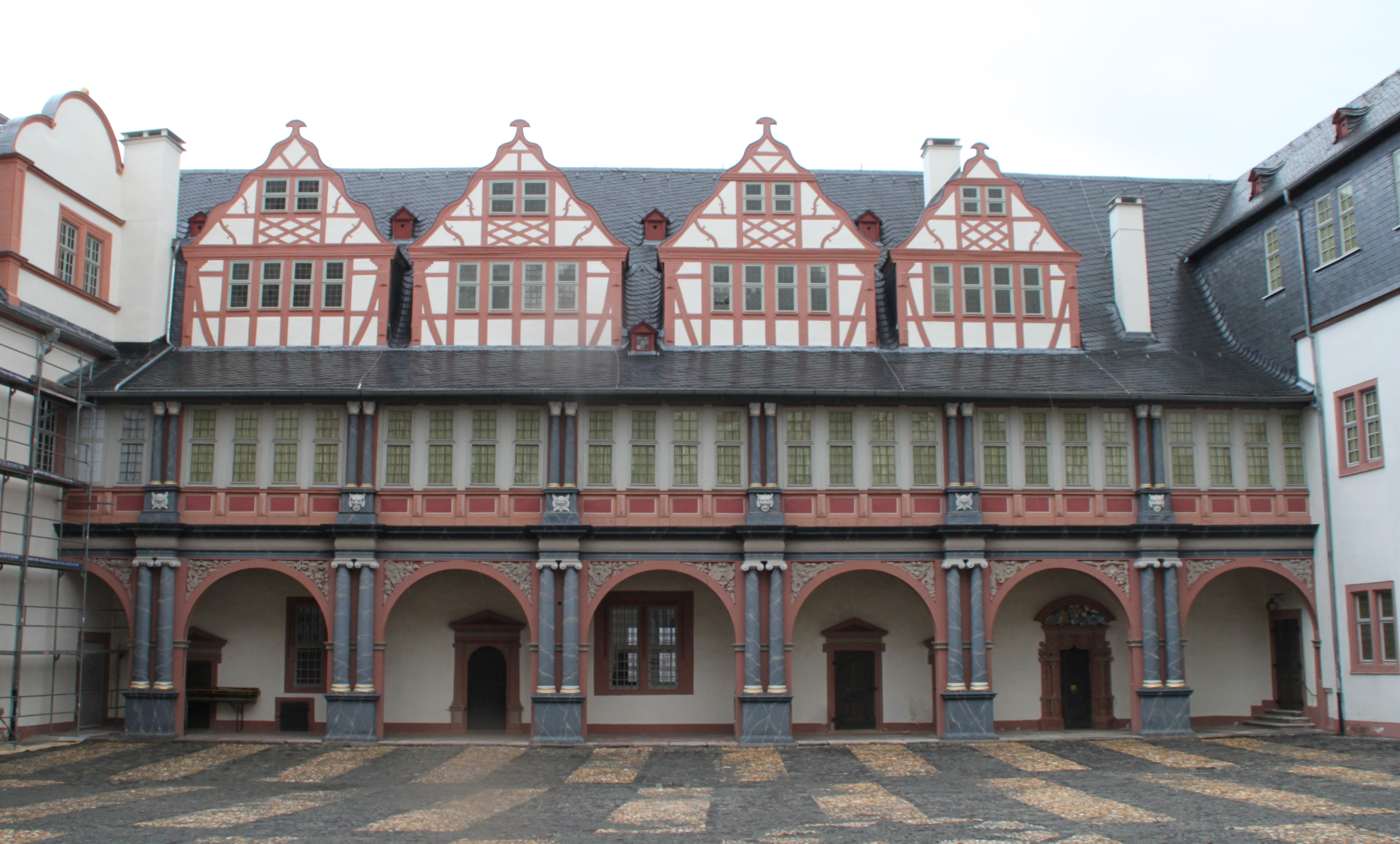
A broader view

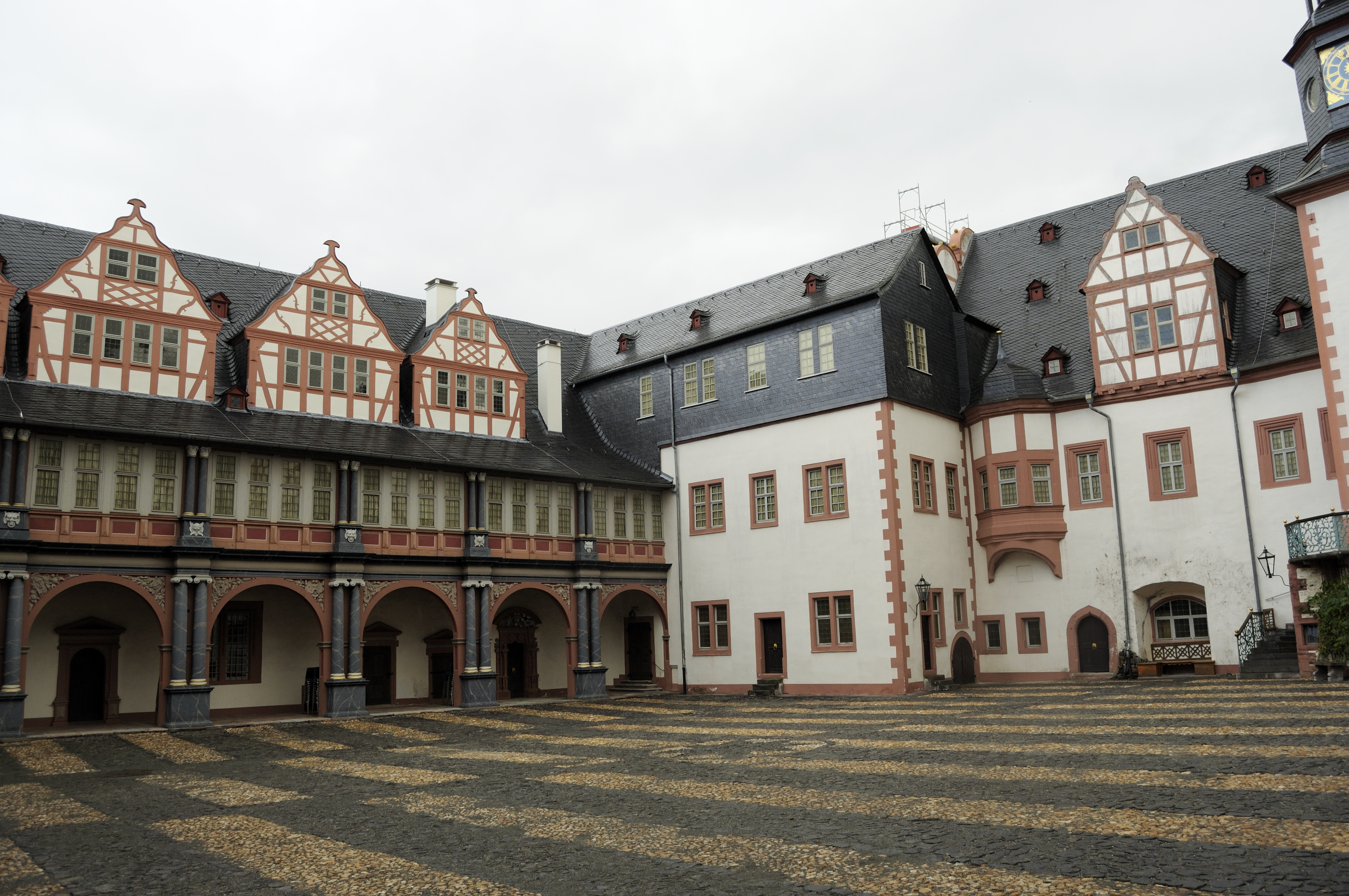
Northeast corner of the Renaissance courtyard

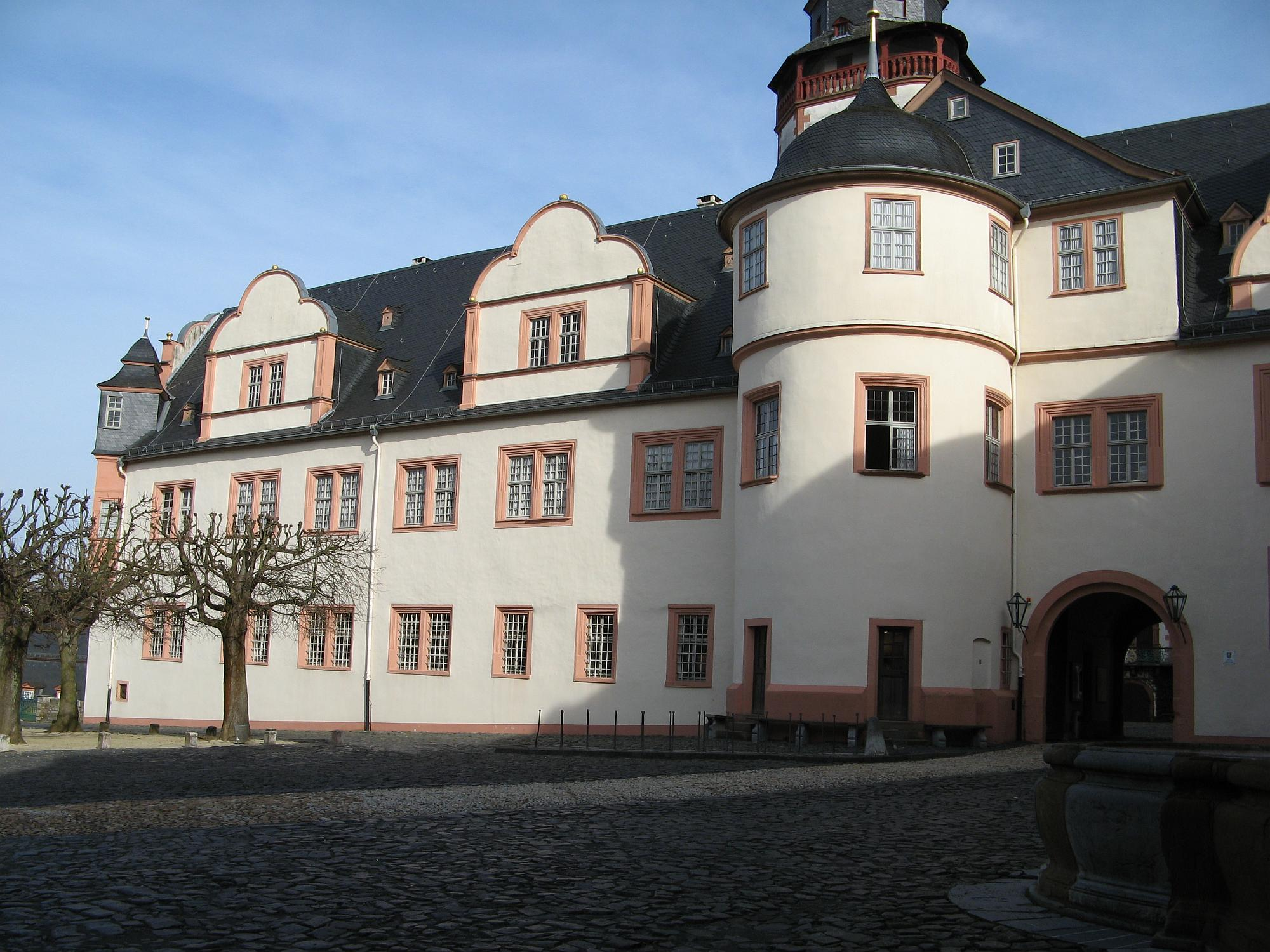
Outside of the west wing

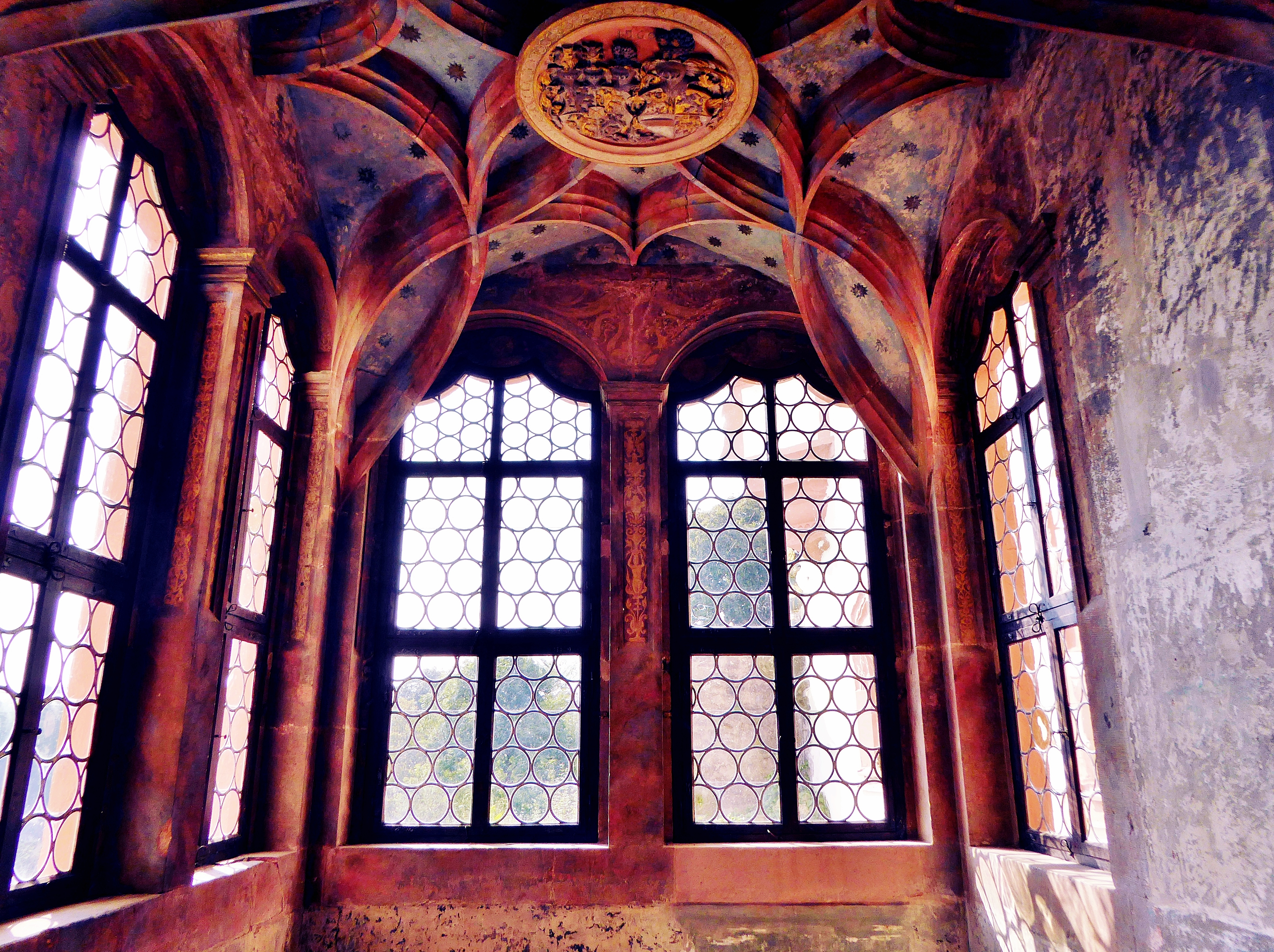
Part of the interior of the Renaissance palace

=== Baroque extensions ===
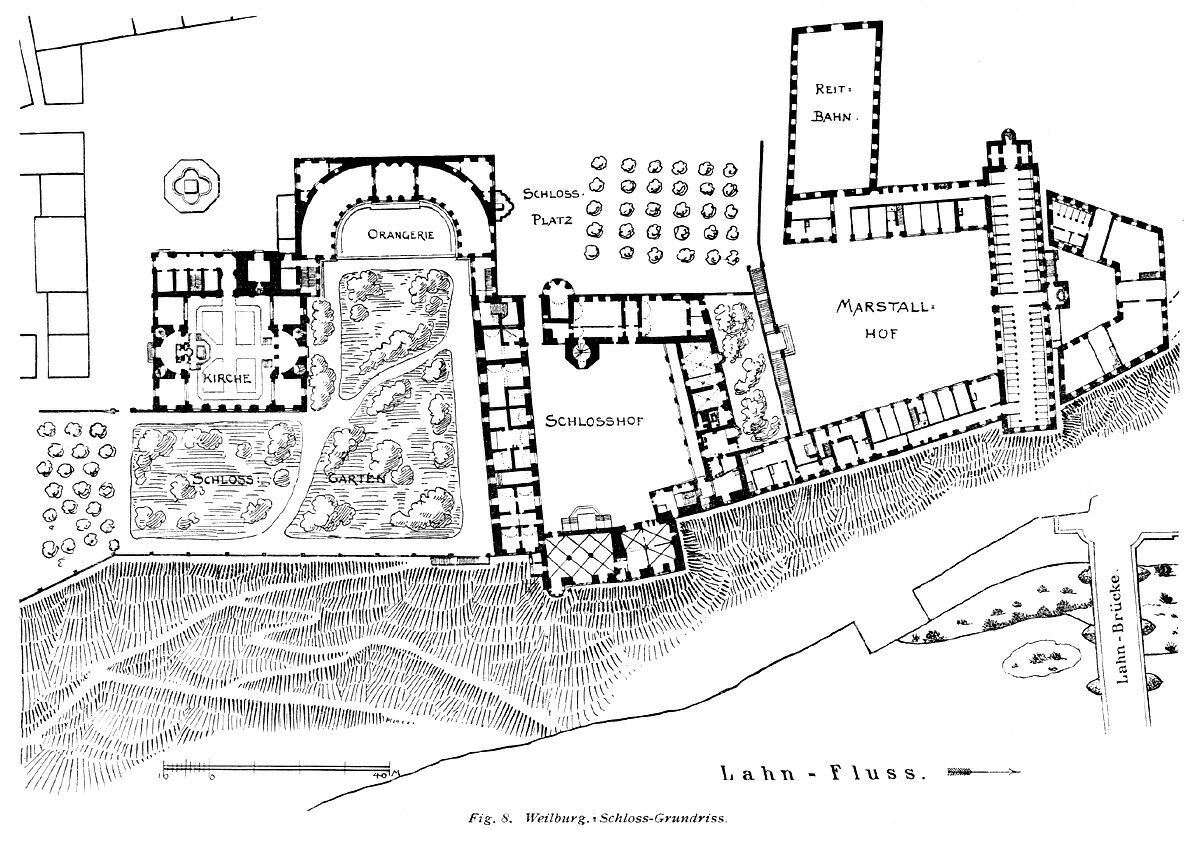
Map of the northeast part the palace. Center, at edge of cliffs, the Renaissance palace; around it, Baroque extensions

The area of the Baroque buildings is almost 400 metres (1,300 ft) long and surrounds the old Renaissance palace. In 1703, John Ernst, Count of Nassau-Weilburg, commissioned builder Julius Ludwig Rothweil to expand the palace. He built the Obere Orangerie ("Upper Orangery") from 1703 to 1705. It is a broad, curving corridor connecting to the south side of the Renaissance palace. A combination of conservatory and ballroom, it has large windows on the inner, eastern side of the curve and trompe-l'œil tiles on the walls.

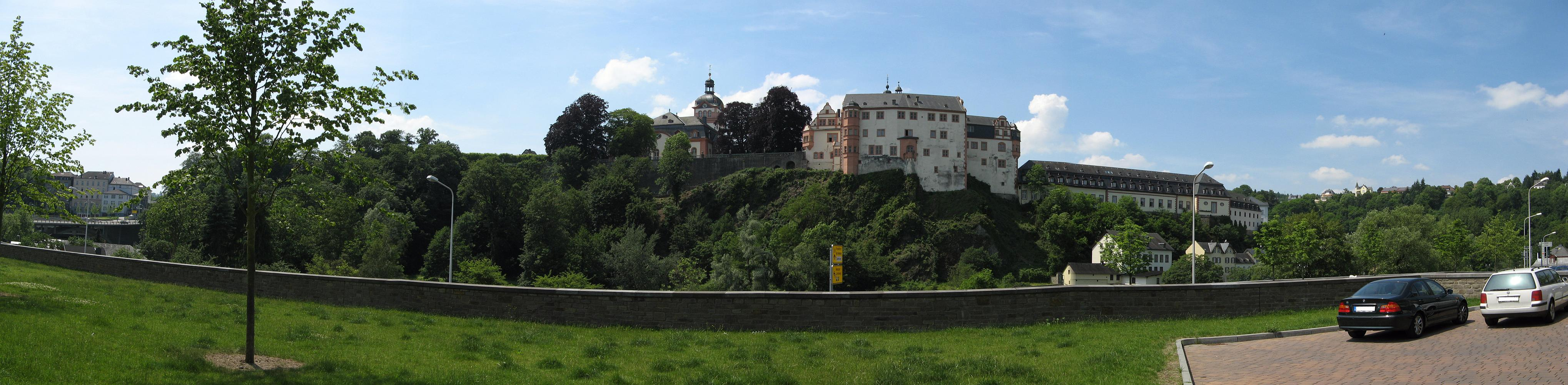
Panorama of Schloss Weilburg from the Westerwald. From left to right: Schlossgarten, Schlosskirche (church), Renaissance Hochschloss (only the outer face of the east wing is visible), Langer Bau, Marstall and Heuscheune

In the south, the Untere Orangerie was added from 1711 to 1713. It is rectangular and followed the model of the Versailles Orangerie. The roof terrace gives a view of the Lahn valley and the parterre garden in front. The Baroque parterre was re-landscaped in the 19th century but rebuilt from 1936 to 1939 according to the original Baroque plans.

At the south end of the Obere Orangerie, the town hall (Rathaus) and church (Schlosskirche) were built, and the garden terraces (Schlossgarten) were installed. In the west, the new Rentkammer and Kanzlei were built for the administration of the county.

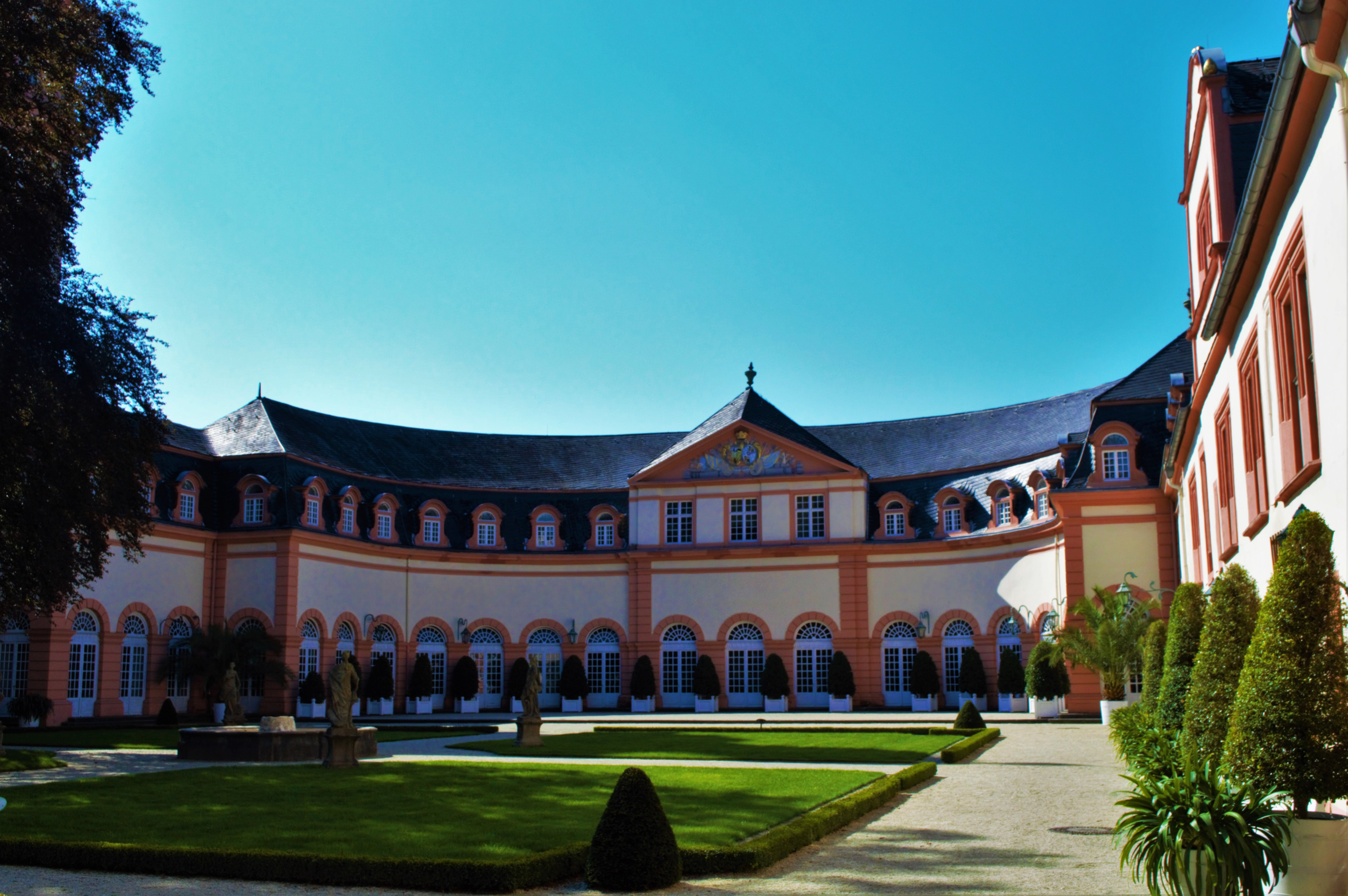
The curved Obere Orangerie

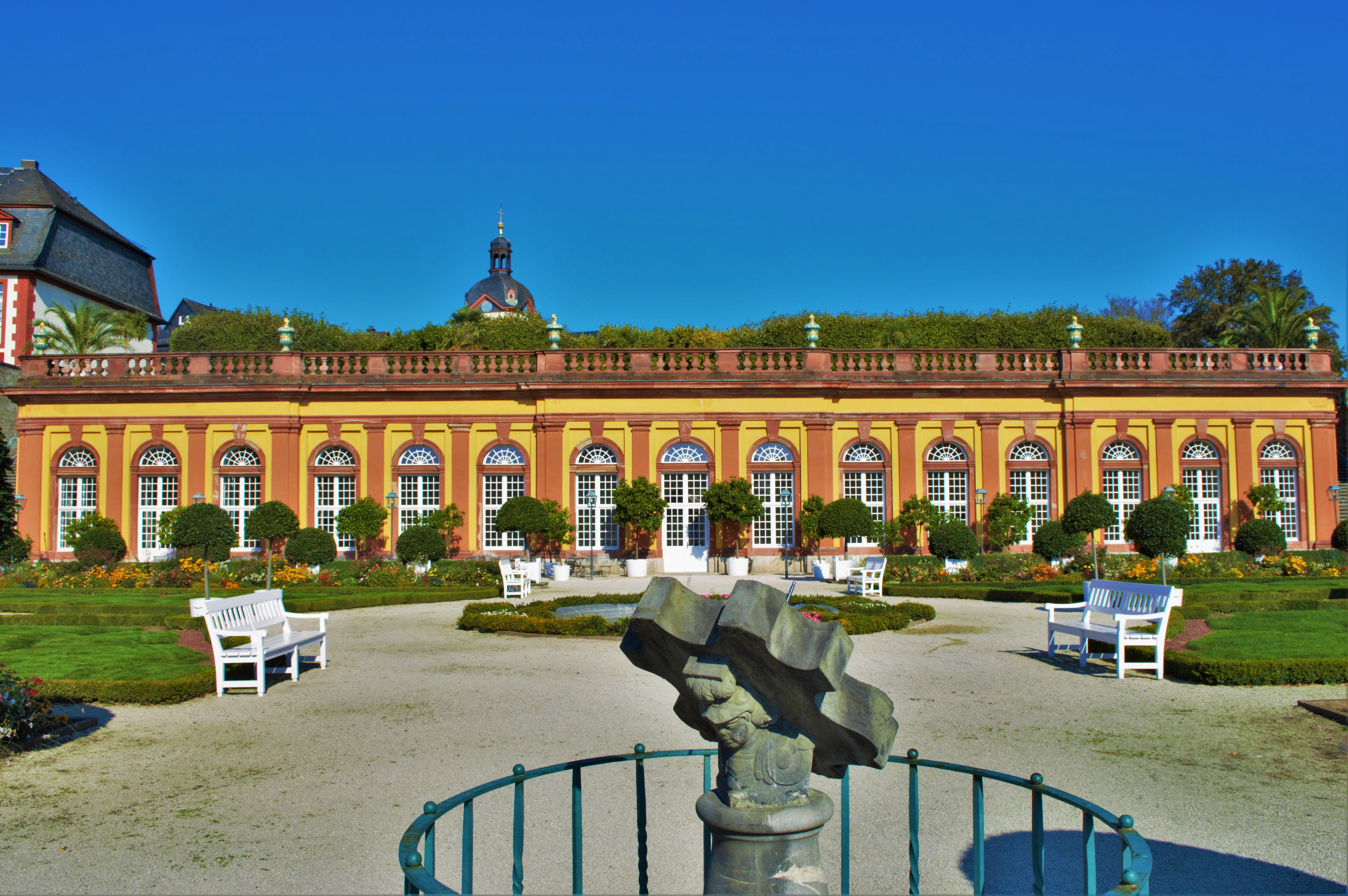
Untere Orangerie

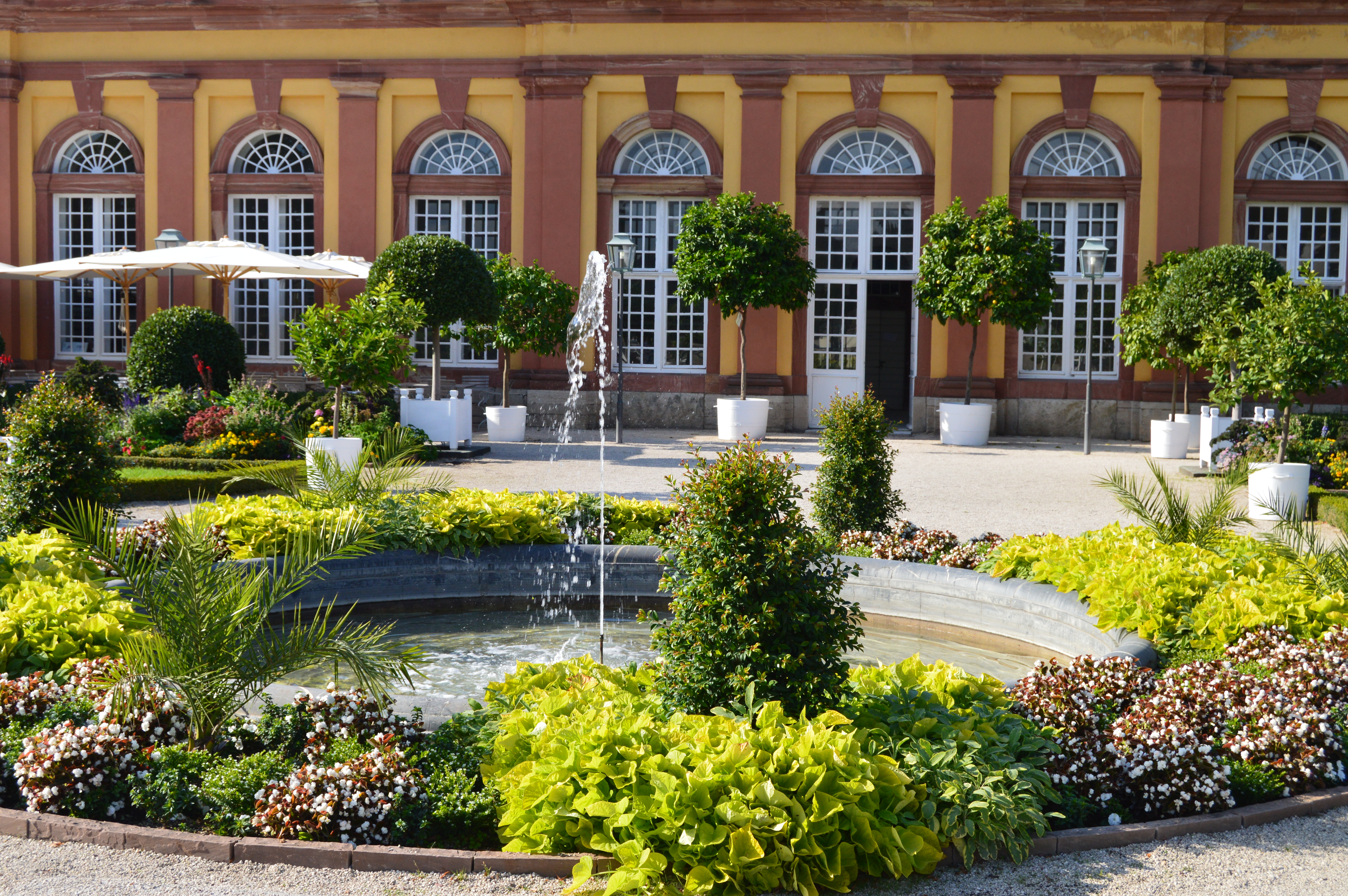
Untere Orangerie and adjacent garden

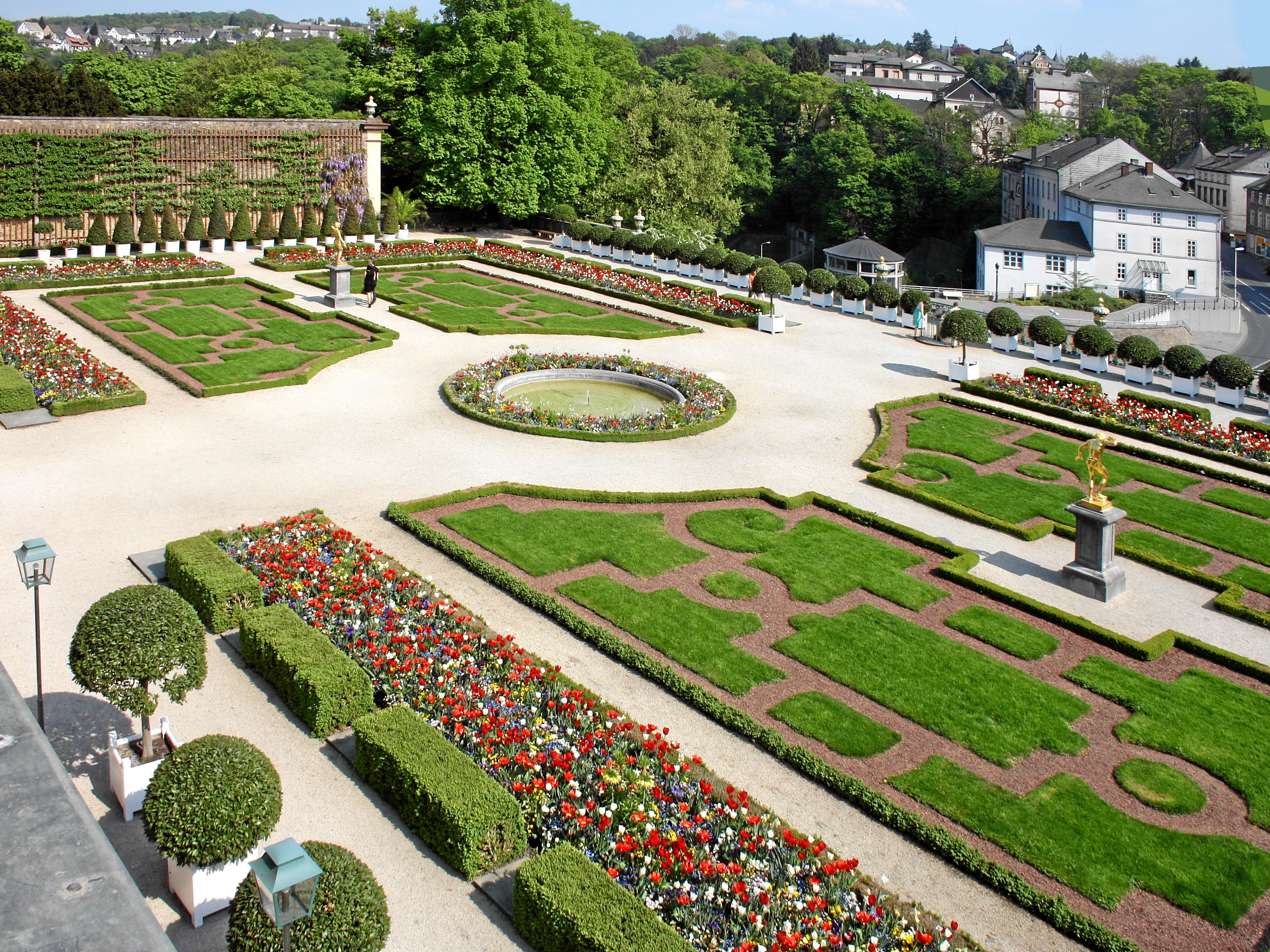
The parterre in front of the Untere Orangerie

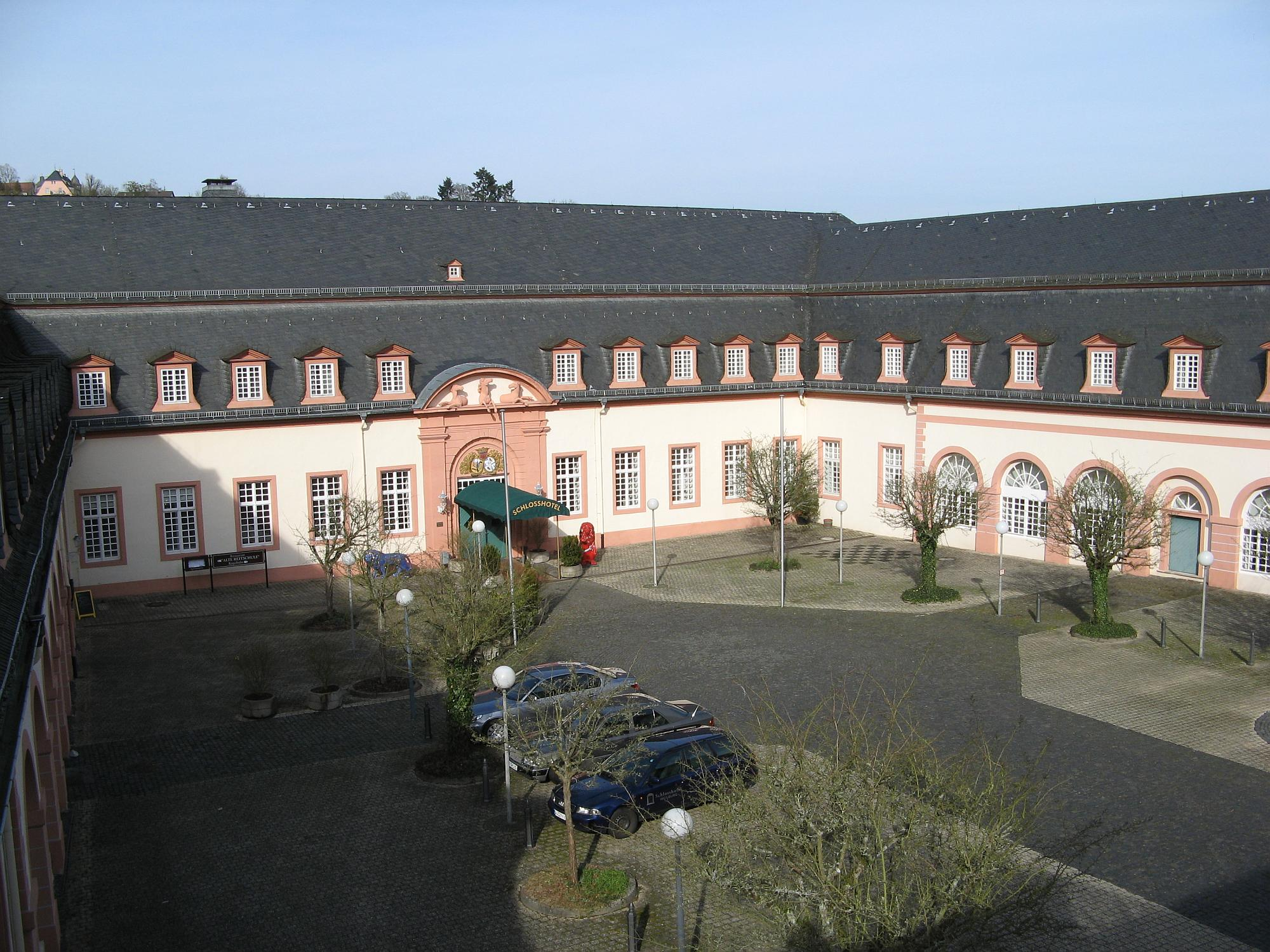
The northern buildings are now a hotel

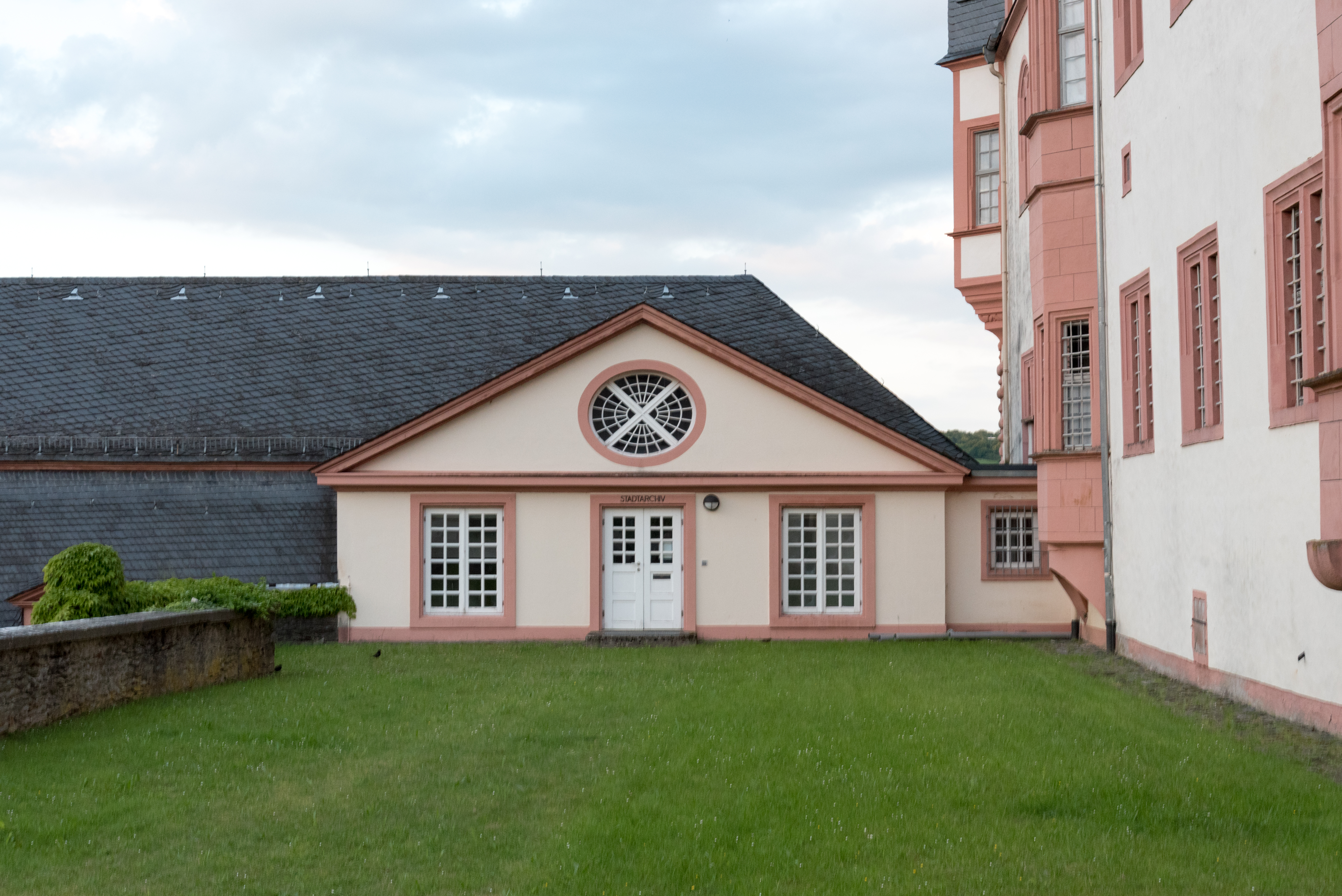
Another part of the Marstall (stables)

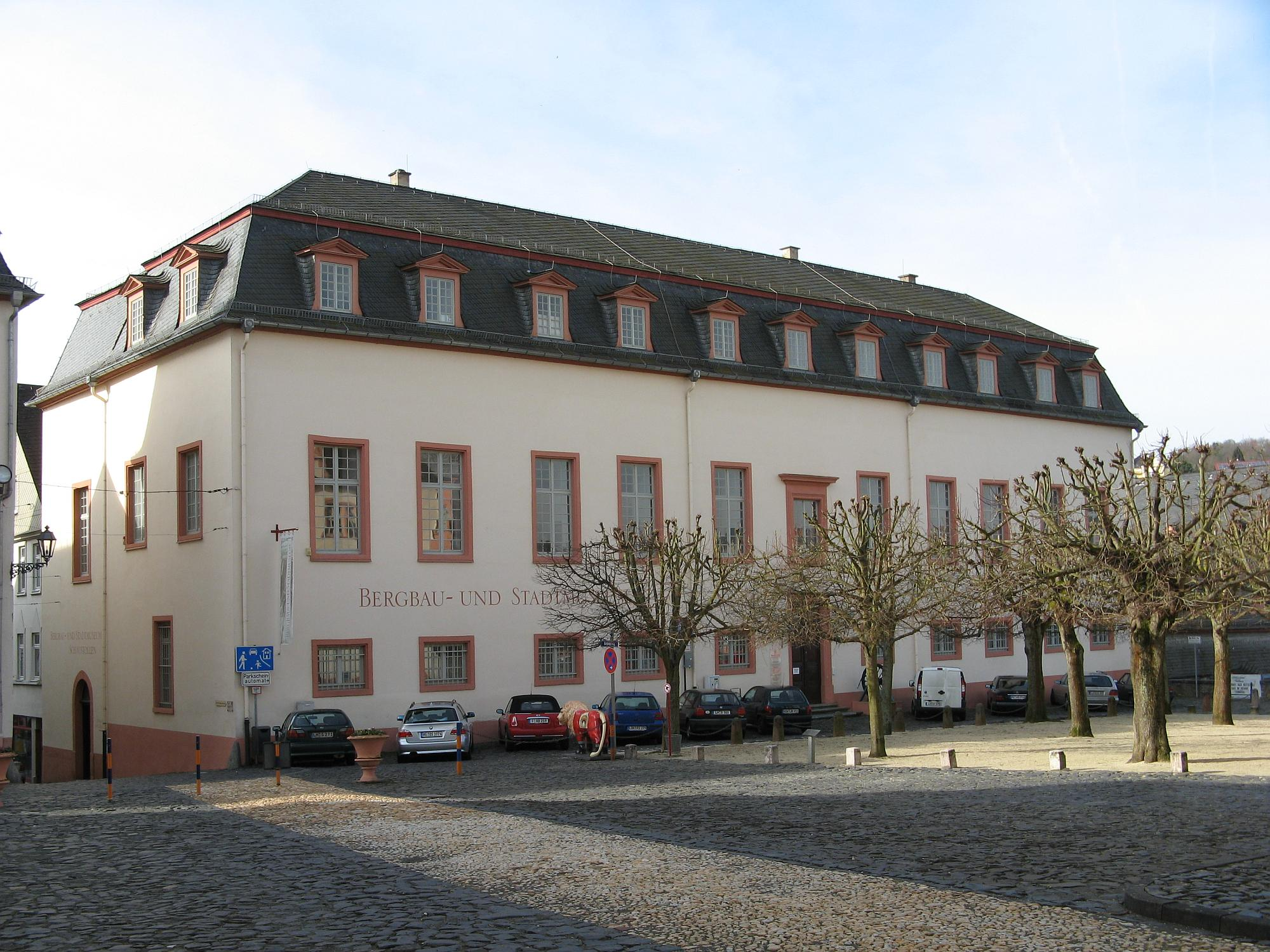
The Kanzelei, on the west side of the palace.

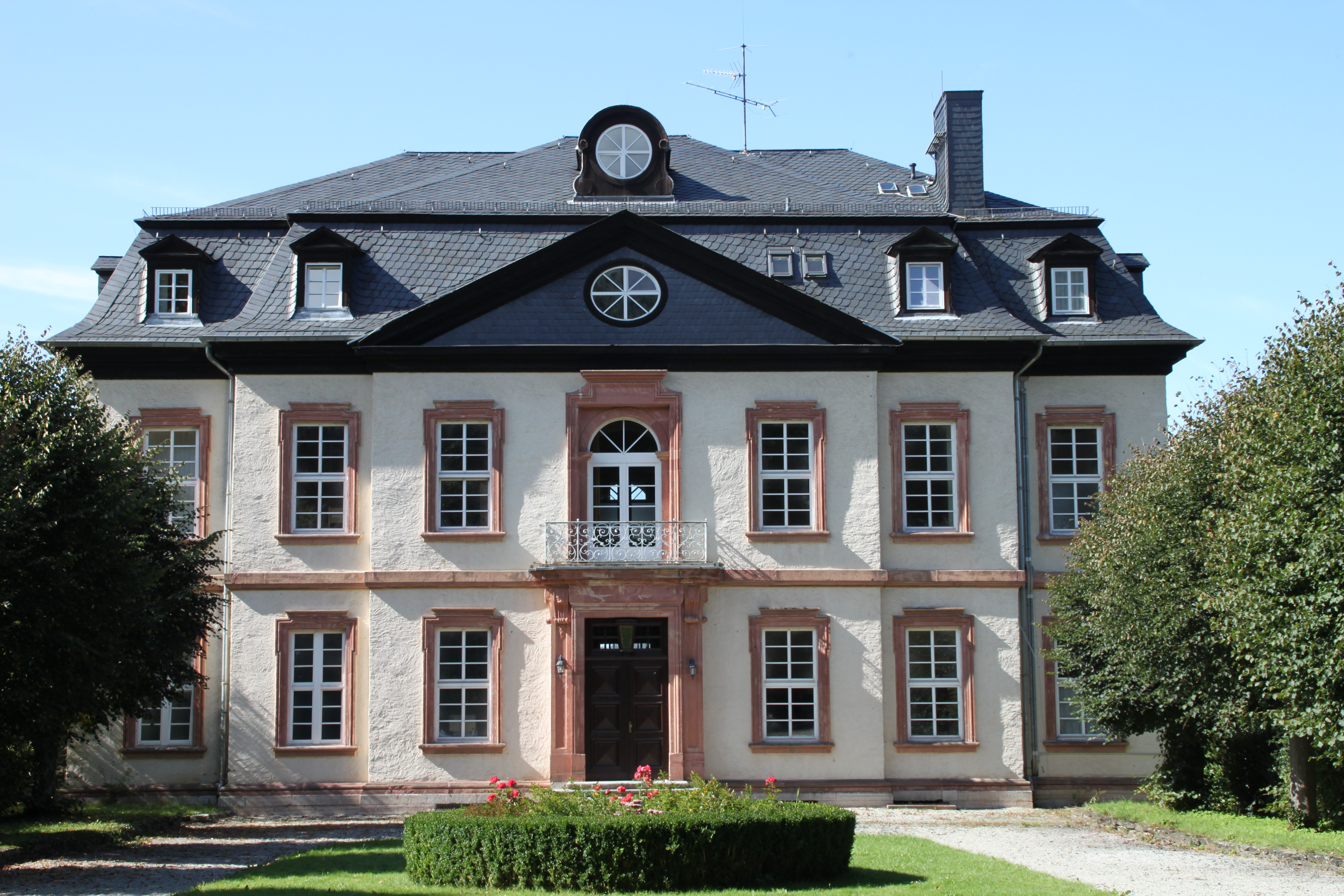
Part of the Windhof

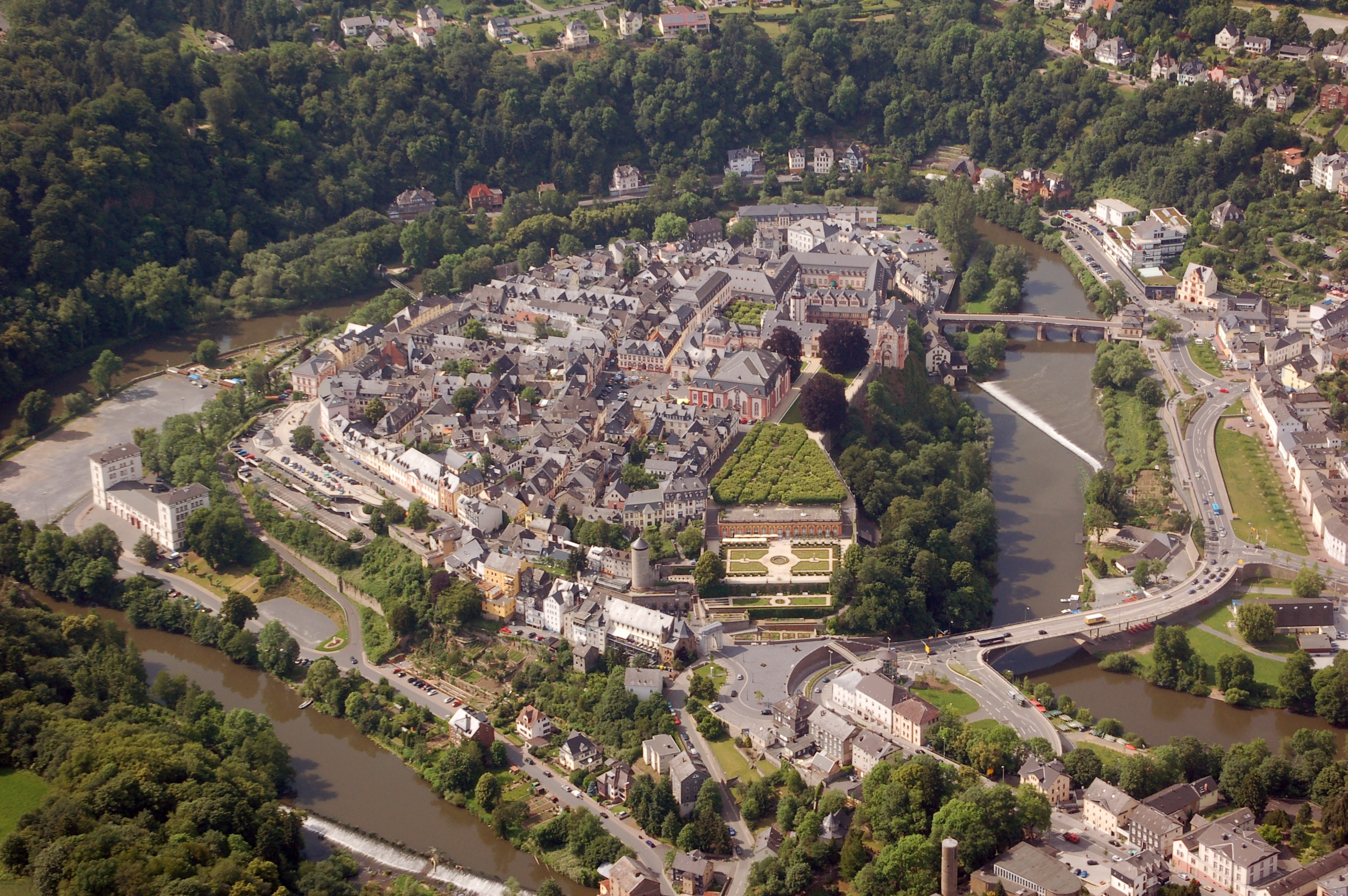
View from the south, showing terraced garden and tower from old city wall

==== Schlosskirche ====
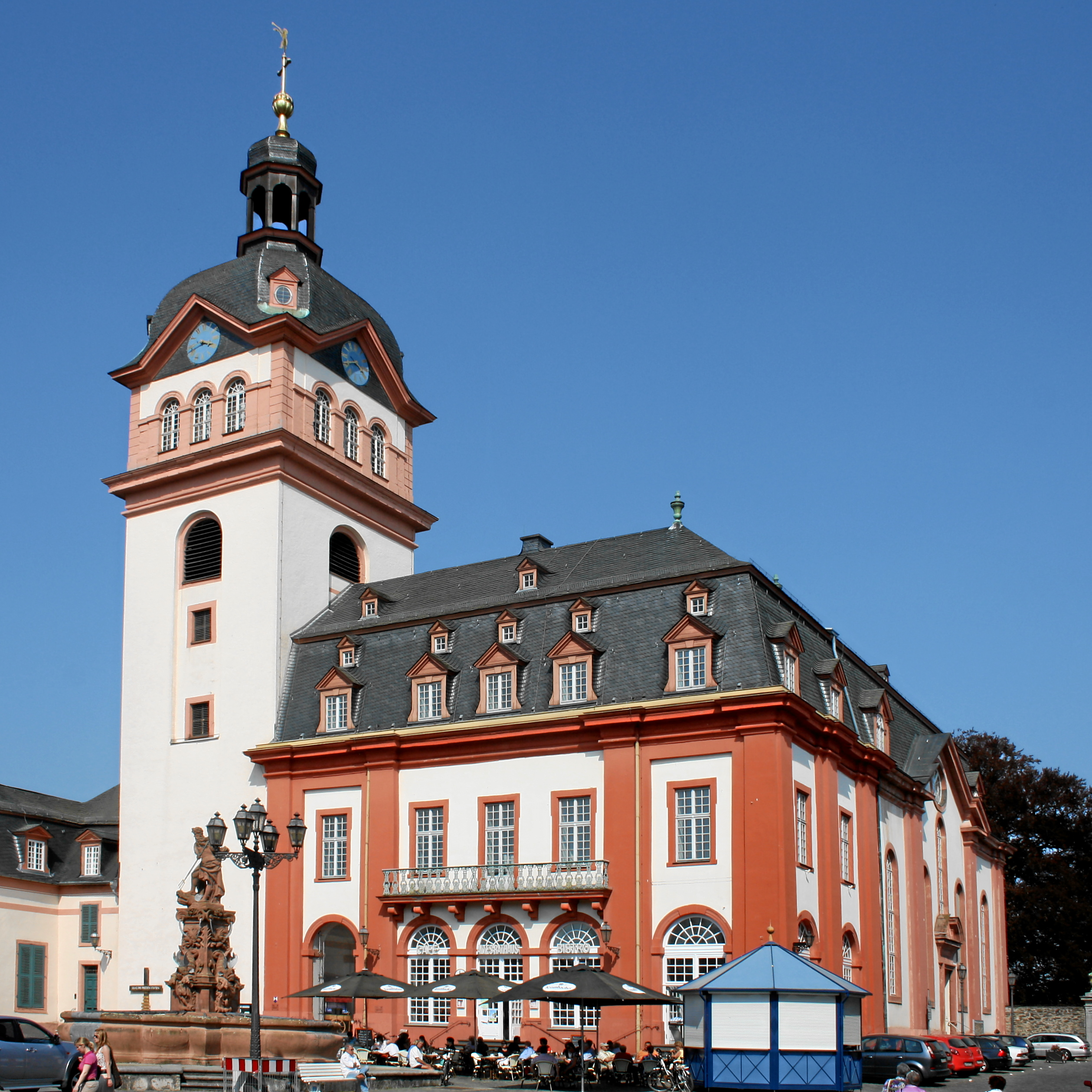
Old town hall and Schlosskirche

The palace church (Schlosskirche) was built to conclude the expansion to a Baroque residence. The new church was built from 1707 to 1713 and cost over 32,000 guilders. It served the county, the town and the court.

The Schlosskirche is regarded as one of Germany's most notable Protestant Baroque church buildings, along with St. Michaelis in Hamburg and the Dresden Frauenkirche.

==== Gardens ====
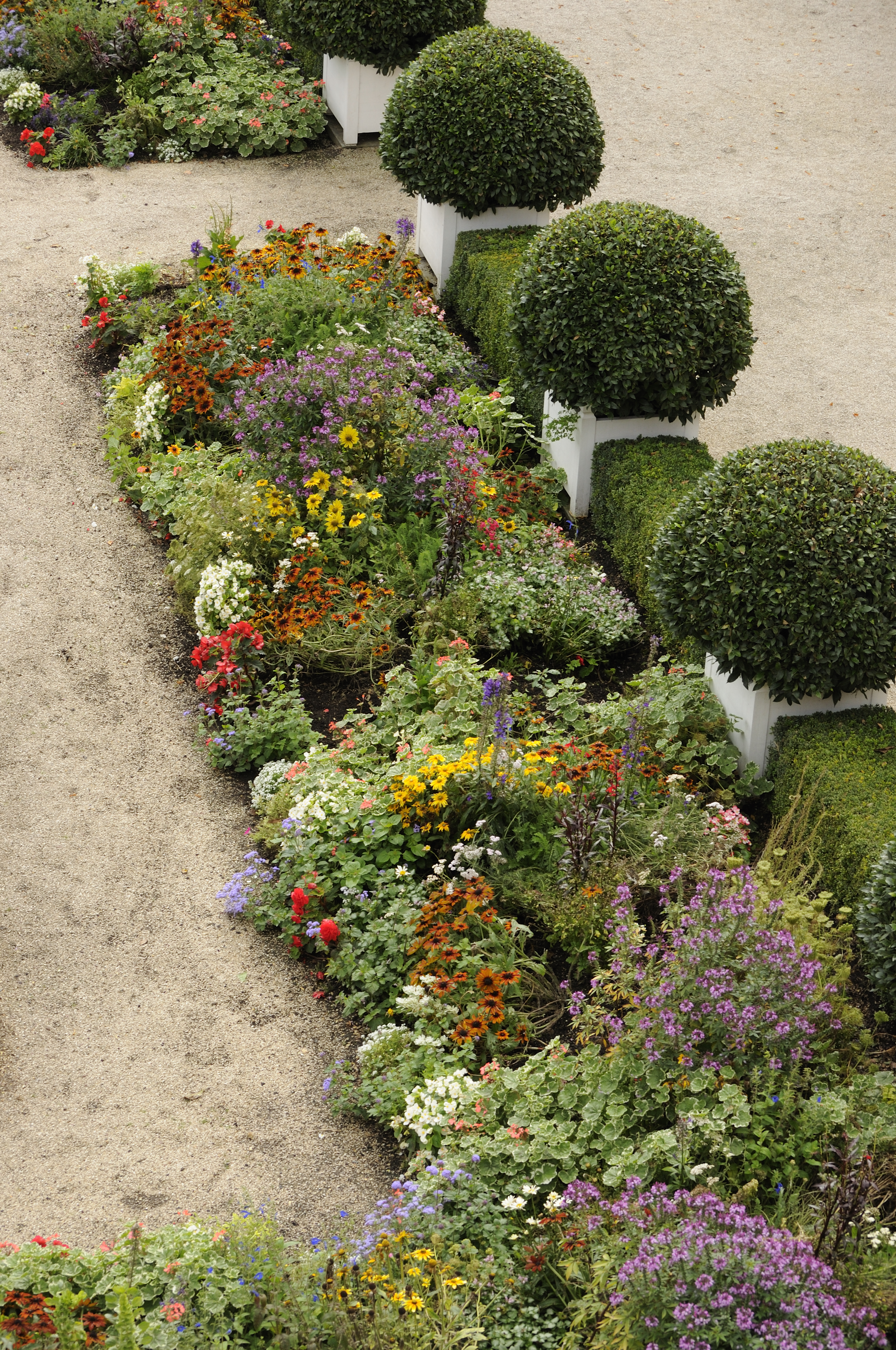
Part of the gardens

The Renaissance gardens covered 1.5 hectares (3.7 acres). When the palace was transformed to a Baroque residential palace, the gardens were redesigned and substantially extended with seven terraces, so that they covered 3.8 hectares (9.4 acres). Parts of the garden were created by Francois LeMarie from 1701. Later notable gardeners included the brothers Johann Wilhelm Sckell and Johann Friedrich Sckell. The gardens are decorated with fountains and sculptures.

==== Water supply ====
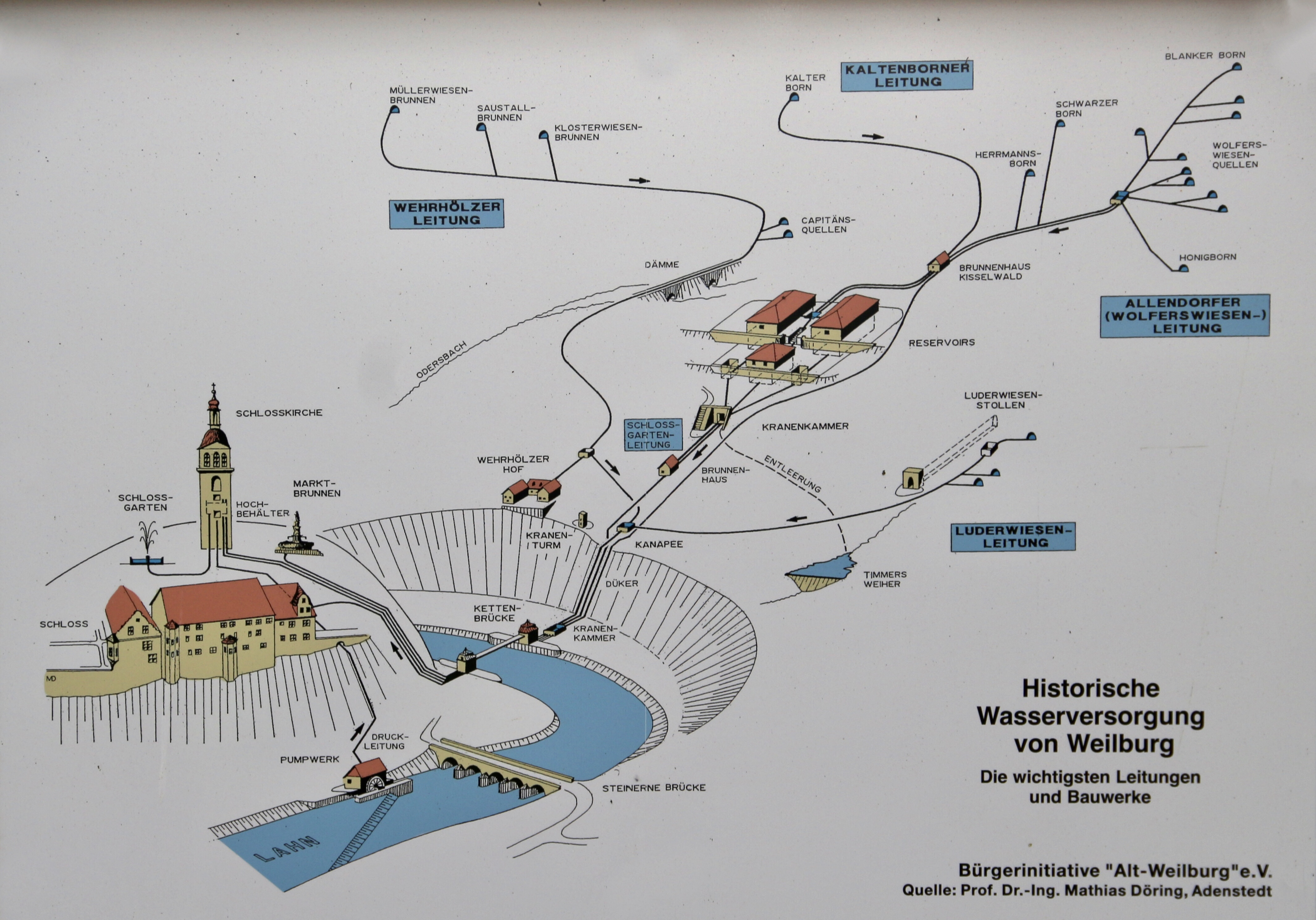
Diagram of the Baroque water supply system

The fountains, gardens, and baths of the Baroque palace required an abundant water supply, and a new system had to be built. The Baroque water supply system gathered water from a large number of springs, then carried it down, over the Lahn river, and up to the town and castle. The system supplied water until the end of the 1800s, when it had to be abandoned due to lack of maintenance. It is now being researched and restored.

The waterpipes were originally carried over the Lahn by the Rothe Brücke. In 1784, high water and ice jamming destroyed this bridge, and in 1785-1786 it was replaced by the Kettenbrucke ("Chain Bridge"), which remained in service until 1934.

==== Northern buildings ====
At the north end, Viehhof was heavily redeveloped, with the building of the Marstall (formal stables), the Prinzessenbau, and the Kabinettbau. The Reithalle ("riding hall") was built from 1705 to 1708, and the Heuscheuer (haybarn) from 1743 to 1746. The Prinzessenbau and Marstall are now the Schlosshotel ("Castle Hotel") and the Kabinettsbau and Reitbahn are now the Stadthalle (city event space).

=== Later use ===
In the 18th century, plans for major changes were made but not realised; therefore, the Baroque palace has been preserved. The interior was renovated in Empire Style from 1801 to 1816.

In 1935, the palace was sold to the Prussian state. Its administration of state palaces and gardens installed a museum from 1936 to 1942. After World War II, it was managed by the Hessian administration, Verwaltung der Staatlichen Schlösser und Gärten Hessen, which is responsible for the preservation of the buildings and the gardens. There are guided tours.

Several areas are venues of the Weilburger Schlosskonzerte music festival, which is held annually in the summer: the Renaissancehof, Alte Hofstube, Untere Orangerie, Obere Orangerie and the Stadthalle in the former riding hall.

== Literature ==
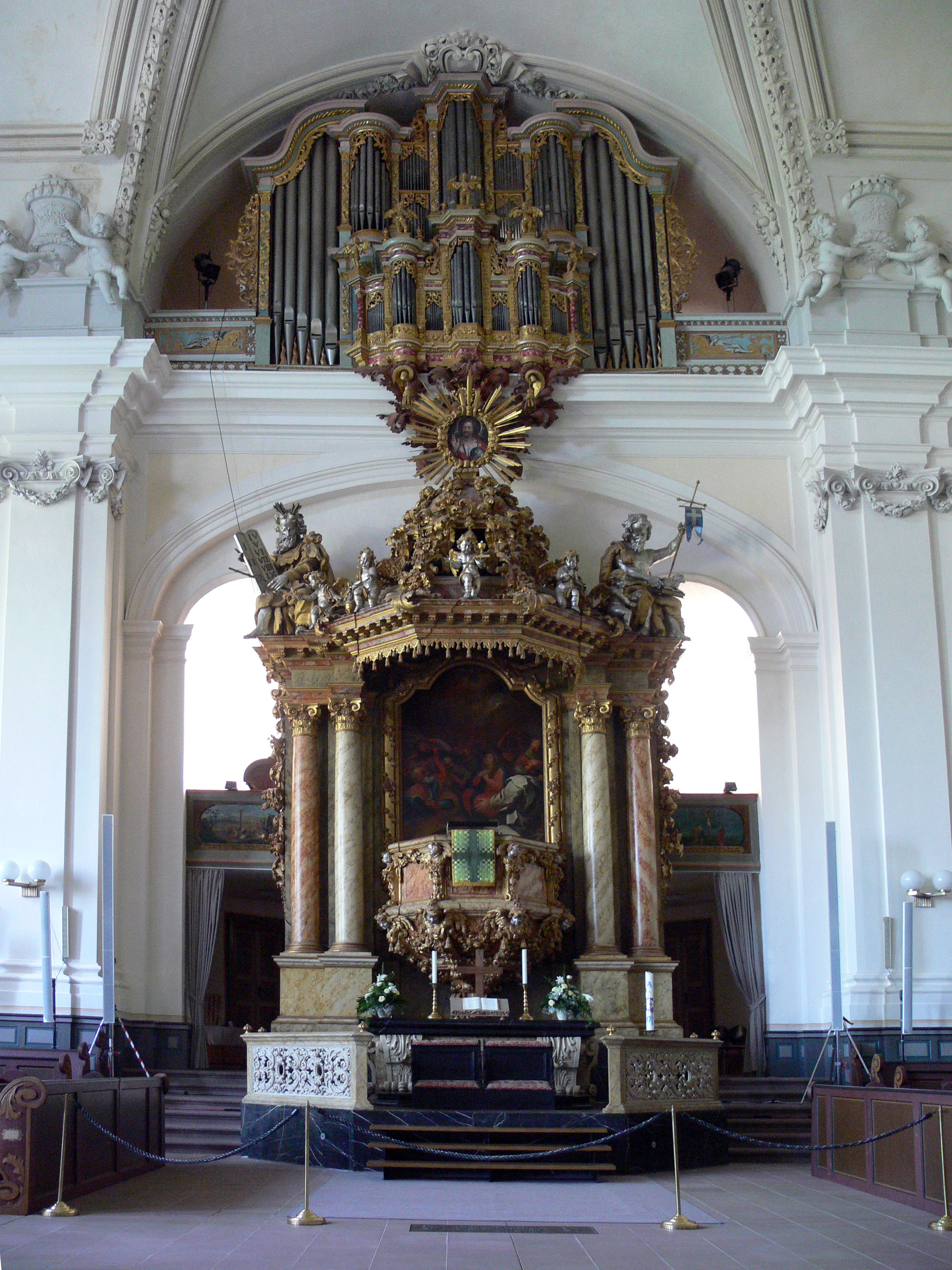
Interior of the Schlosskirche

- Georg Ulrich Großmann: Mittel- und Südhessen: Lahntal, Taunus, Rheingau, Wetterau, Frankfurt und Maintal, Kinzig, Vogelsberg, Rhön, Bergstraße und Odenwald. DuMont, Cologne 1995, ISBN 3-7701-2957-1, p. 57–63 (DuMont Kunst-Reiseführer).
- Bernd Modrow, Claudia Gröschel (2002), Fürstliches Vergnügen. 400 Jahre Gartenkultur in Hessen (in German), Regensburg: Schnell & Steiner Verlag, ISBN 3-7954-1487-3
- Eckhard Olschewski (2001), Schloss und Schlossgarten Weilburg/Lahn, Bad Homburg, Verwaltung der Staatlichen Schlösser und Gärten Hessen (in German), ISBN 3-7954-1286-2
- Eckhard Olschewski (2005), "Die Weilburger Residenzarchitektur Julius Ludwig Rothweils", Nassauische Annalen (in German), vol. 116, Wiesbaden: Verlag des Vereines für Nassauische Altertumskunde und Geschichtsforschung, ISSN 0077-2887
