= Ivanhoe (1958 TV series) =

British TV adventure series (1958–1959)

- Genre: Adventure; Historical drama
- Starring: Roger Moore
- Opening theme: Edwin Astley
- Composer: Albert Elms
- Country of origin: United Kingdom
- No. of episodes: 39

Production
- Executive producer: Peter Rogers
- Producers: Herbert Smith; Bernard Coote
- Running time: 25 minutes (excluding commercials)
- Production companies: Screen Gems; Sydney Box Productions

Original release
- Network: ITV
- Release: 5 January 1958 – 1959

Ivanhoe is a British television adventure series first shown on ITV network in 1958–1959. The show features Roger Moore in his first starring role, as Sir Wilfred of Ivanhoe, in a series of adventures aimed at a children's audience. The characters were drawn loosely from Sir Walter Scott's 1819 novel Ivanhoe.

== Plot ==
The series is set in England during the 12th century reign of King Richard the Lionheart, who had gone to fight in the Crusades and failed to return. In his absence, power had been taken by his younger brother, the ambitious and wicked Prince John, who sought to strip the people of their rights and land. The dashing and heroic knight Ivanhoe, with his father-and-son companions Gurth and Bart whom he had freed from servitude (from the evil Sir Maurice), attempted to right wrongs, secure justice, help those in need, and thwart John and his allies.

== Making of the series ==
Swashbuckling adventures for a younger audience, such as The Adventures of the Scarlet Pimpernel, The Adventures of Robin Hood and The Adventures of Sir Lancelot, were an element of ITV's programming in Britain in the mid-1950s. In December 1956, Columbia Pictures signed up Roger Moore, then working with limited success in Hollywood, to play the title role in an intended series for transmission in both America and the UK. The series was a co-production between the Columbia subsidiary Screen Gems and the British producer Sydney Box.

The budget was more generous than that of the Robin Hood series running at the time and filming started in early 1957. Shooting of the pilot was at the ABPC studios at Elstree (for the series at Beaconsfield Studios) and on location around Buckinghamshire in England, but with some shooting also taking place in California. The series premiered on ITV in January 1958, while filming of all 39 episodes continued through to June 1958. Although the pilot episode was shot in colour, the rest of the series was shot in black and white. The executive producer was Peter Rogers, who around the same time began producing the Carry On films. Guest stars in the series included Christopher Lee. Supporting actors included John Schlesinger, Jon Pertwee, Paul Eddington, Leonard Sachs, Kenneth Cope, John Warner and Adrienne Corri.

Moore insisted on undertaking much of the stunt work himself, resulting in several injuries including three cracked ribs from a fight scene and being knocked unconscious when a battleaxe hit his helmeted skull. Moore later commented, "I felt a complete Charlie riding around in all that armour and damned stupid plumed helmet. I felt like a medieval fireman."

The series finished when Moore returned to Hollywood after Warner Bros. offered him a movie role in The Miracle (1959).

== Cultural Influence ==
The series inspired Prince Luitpold of Bavaria in his childhood, leading to his founding of the Kaltenberger Ritterturnier in 1979, which grew into the world's largest jousting tournament.

== Cast ==
- Roger Moore as Sir Wilfred of Ivanhoe
- Robert Brown as Gurth (Ivanhoe's armourer)
- Peter Gilmore as Waldo Ivanhoe
- Andrew Keir as Prince John
- Phyllis Neilson-Terry as Eleanor of Aquitaine
- John Pike as Bart (the son of Gurth)(Ivanhoe's squire)
- Bruce Seton as King Richard
- Anthony Dawson as Sir Maurice
- Norah Gorsen as Lady Rowena (Ivanhoe's girlfriend)
- Henry Vidon as Sir Cedric (Ivanhoe's father, who owns Rotherwood Castle)

== Episodes ==
The 39 episodes of the series were originally broadcast from 5 January 1958 to 4 January 1959 and were repeated several times. The broadcast dates are in parentheses.

1. "Freeing the Serfs" (5 January 1958)
2. "Slave Traders" (12 January 1958)
3. "Wedding Cake" (19 January 1958)
4. "Black Boar" (26 January 1958)
5. "Whipping Boy" (2 February 1958)
6. "The Witness" (9 February 1958)
7. "German Knight" (16 February 1958)
8. "Face to Face" (23 February 1958)
9. "Rinaldo" (2 March 1958)
10. "Lyman the Pieman" (9 March 1958)
11. "The Escape" (16 March 1958)
12. "Ragan's Forge" (23 March 1958)
13. "The Ransom" (29 March 1958)
14. "The Prisoner in the Tower" (5 April 1958)
15. "Murder at the Inn" (12 April 1958)
16. "Brothers in Arms" (14 June 1958)
17. "The Weavers" (21 June 1958)
18. "Counterfeit" (6 July 1958)
19. "The Widow of Woodcote" (20 July 1958)
20. "The Kidnapping" (27 July 1958)
21. "Treasures from Cathay" (10 August 1958)
22. "By Hook or By Crook" (17 August 1958)
23. "The Double-Edged Sword" (24 August 1958)
24. "Search For Gold" (31 August 1958)
25. "The Masked Bandits" (7 September 1958)
26. "Freelance" (21 September 1958)
27. "The Masons" (28 September 1958)
28. "Arms and the Woman" (5 October 1958)
29. "The Cattle Killers" (19 October 1958)
30. "The Gentle Jester" (26 October 1958)
31. "3 Days to Worcester" (9 November 1958)
32. "The Night Raiders" (16 November 1958)
33. "The Raven" (23 November 1958)
34. "The Monk" (30 November 1958)
35. "The Swindler" (7 December 1958)
36. "The Princess" (14 December 1958)
37. "The Fledgling" (21 December 1958)
38. "The Circus" (28 December 1958)
39. "The Devil's Dungeon" (4 January 1959)

== Title song ==
Each episode starts with the title song:

Ivanhoe, Ivanhoe
Side by side we’re proud to ride with Ivanhoe
At his call we spring to help him right or wrong
The song we sing is freedom's joyous song
Ivanhoe, Ivanhoe
Far and wide throughout the countryside they know
There’s freedom on his banner, justice in his sword
He rides against the manor where tyranny is lord
Rich and poor, together we go
Forward with Ivanhoe
With I-van-hoe

Each episode ends with the following song:

Ivanhoe, Ivanhoe
To adventure, bold adventure watch him go
There's no power on earth can stop what he's begun
With Bart and Gurth, he'll fight 'till he has won
Ivanhoe, Ivanhoe
He's a friend who will defend the people know
He'll strike with speed of lightning, bold and brave and game
In justice he is fighting to win a better day.
Shout a cheer, adventure is here
Riding with Ivanhoe
With I-van-hoe
