= Hollywood Hotel (disambiguation) =

The Hollywood Hotel was a hostelry and landmark of Hollywood, California.

Hollywood Hotel may also refer to:

- Hollywood Hotel (radio program), a 1930s radio program starring Louella Parsons
- Hollywood Hotel (film), a 1937 film starring Dick Powell
- Disney's Hollywood Hotel, at the Hong Kong Disneyland Resort
- Hollywood Hotel, a broadcast studio for Fox NASCAR
- Hotel Hollywood (2010), a thriller film
- Hotel Hollywood, an Australian building in the Inter-War Functionalist style
