= Kaltenberger Ritterturnier =

Annual event in Germany

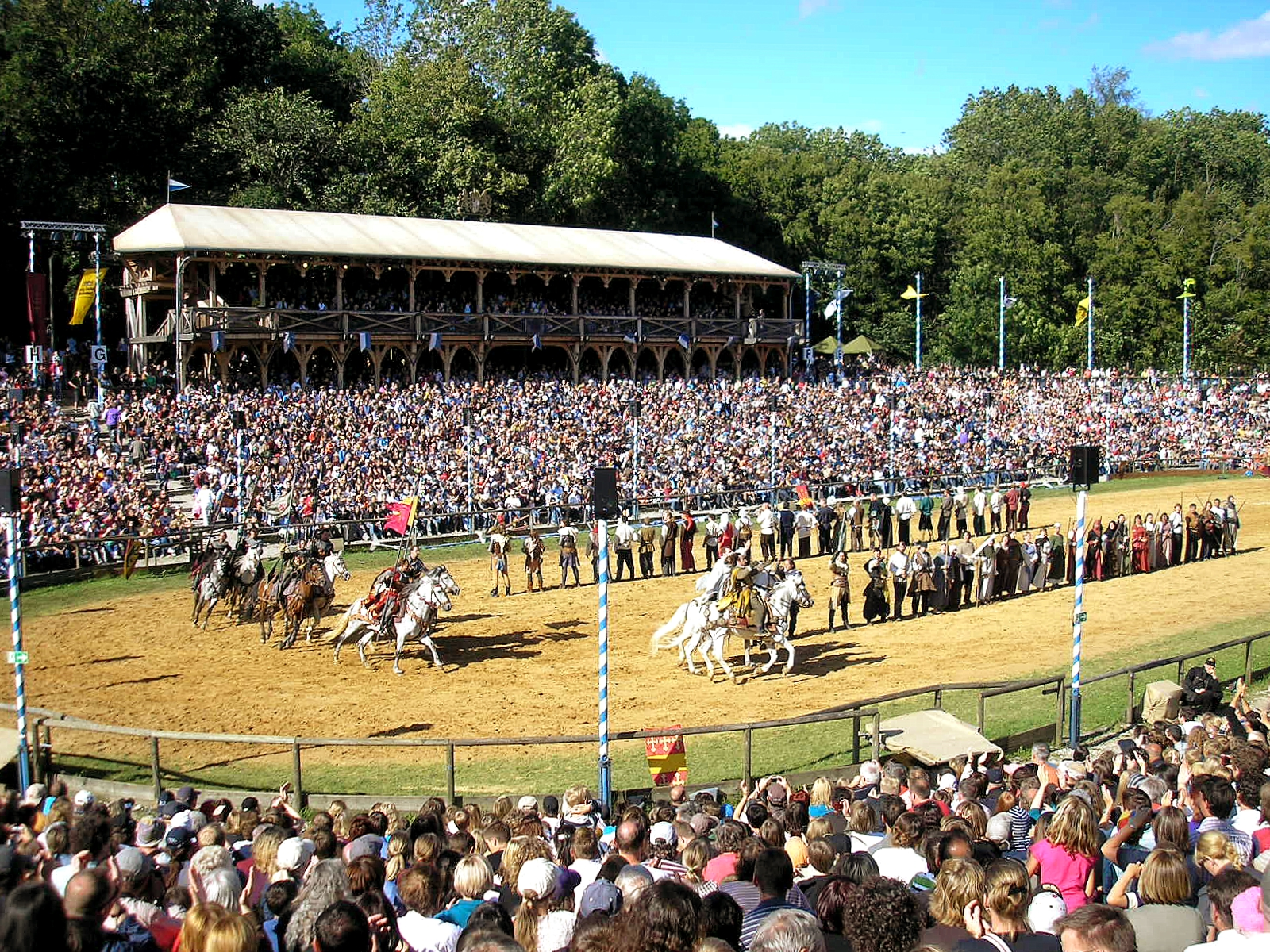
- Kaltenberg Arena
- Status: Active
- Genre: Medieval reenactment Renaissance fair
- Date: July (3 weekends)
- Frequency: Annual
- Locations: Castle Kaltenberg, Geltendorf
- Coordinates: 48°07′55″N 10°59′39″E
- Country: Bavaria, Germany
- Years active: 1979–present
- Founder: Prince Luitpold of Bavaria
- Attendance: 100,000
- Website: www.ritterturnier.de/en/

The Kaltenberger Ritterturnier (Knights' tournament in Kaltenberg) is the worldwide biggest event of its kind. The original event took place in 1980 on the occasion of the 800 year anniversary of the Royal House of Wittelsbach. Over the decades Kaltenberg has become a Bavarian institution comparable to Easter and Christmas.

== History ==
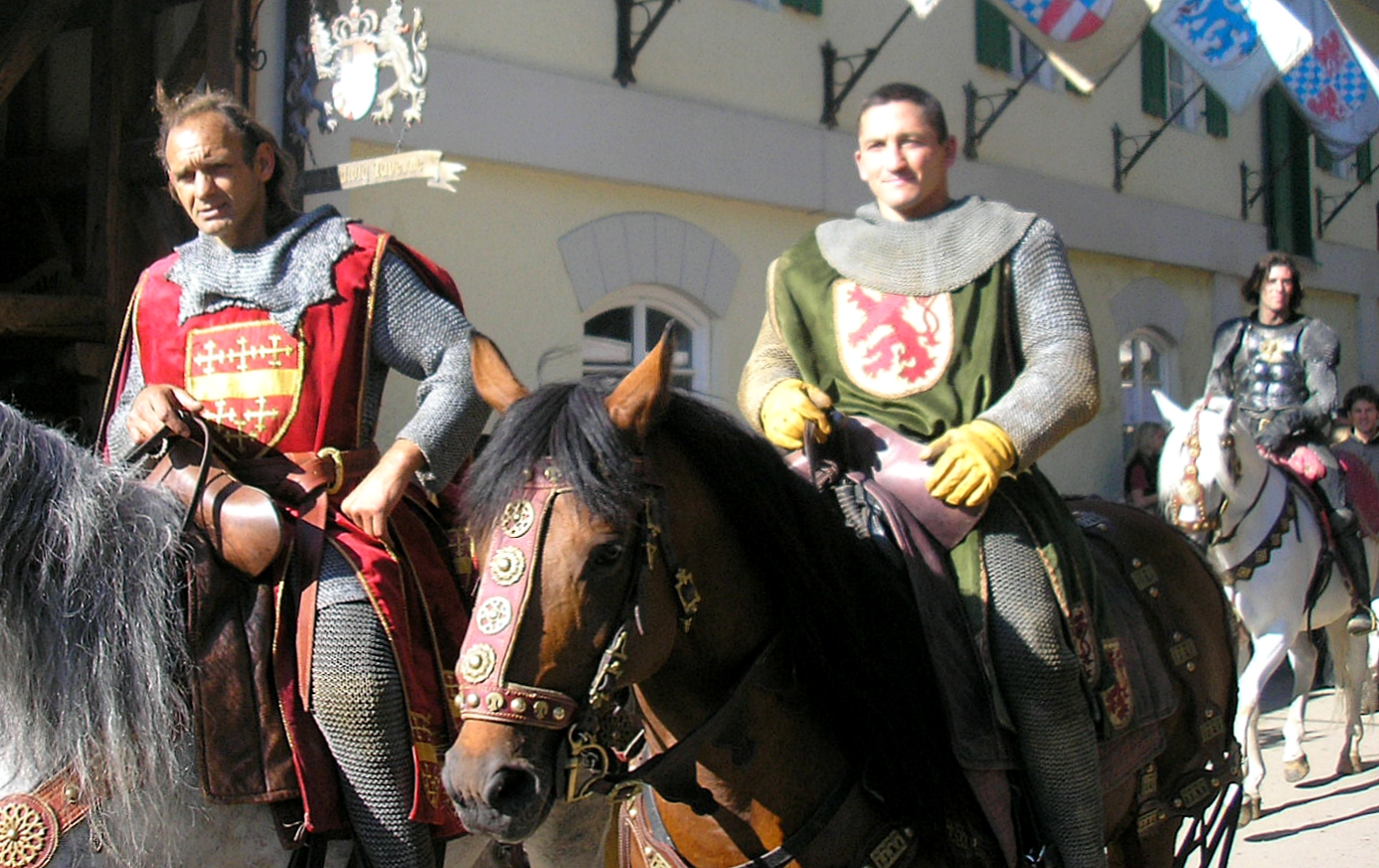
Stunt performers on horseback

The Kaltenberger Ritterturnier was founded in 1980 by Prince Luitpold of Bavaria, the great-grandson of Ludwig III, the last king of Bavaria. He had wished for such a living history event since his childhood. In an interview he later revealed that as a boy he had watched the TV Show Ivanhoe. After 40 years he delegated the oversight to his son Prince Heinrich of Bavaria.

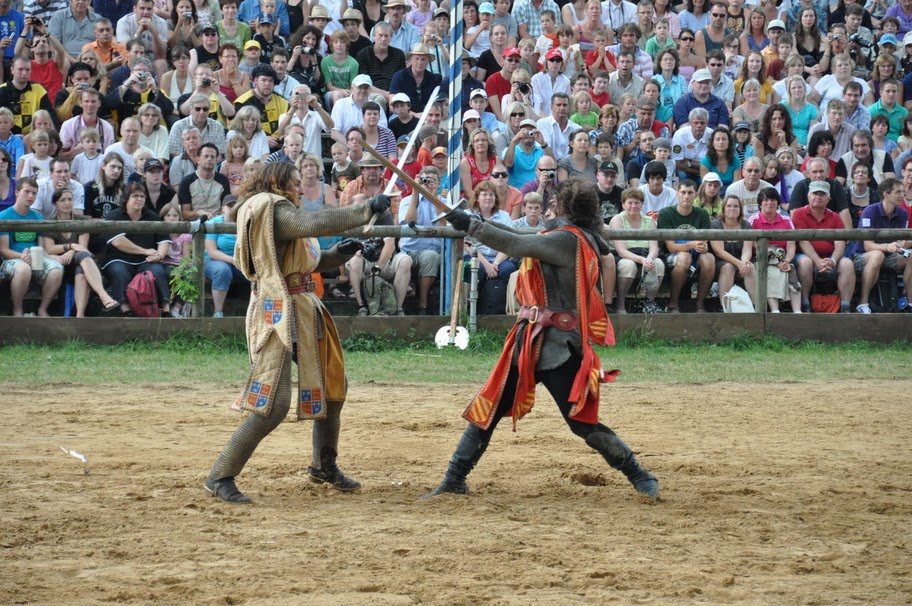
Two performers playing King Arthur and Lancelot.

As stunt performers Prince Luitpold of Bavaria first hired an English team under the helm of Max Diamond whom he had met in London. In 1985 they were succeeded by Jackie Vernon's French cascadeurs who performed for two decades until in 2005 Mario Luraschi and his team 'Cavalcade' took over.

The first edition in 1980 attracted 6,000 spectators and included only a flea market. Already the following year saw applications of professional traders. The traders were joined by jugglers, singers, dancers and storytellers. Eventually the Event turned Kaltenberg each year temporarily into a living medieval town with stage performances by "medieval metal bands like Tanzwut.

By 2014 the event had risen to such a large scale that it required each year an investment of approximately three million euros. Parts of that sum would be spent on personnel and on security requirements such as evacuation routes. According to a contemporary report the event had lost money in some years due to bad weather.

Because of the COVID-19 pandemic the tournament had to pause in 2020 and 2021. In 2020 Prince Luitpold allowed Traders and craftsmen to offer their goods without having to pay any fees for their stalls. When the Event was revived in 2022, Stuntman and actor Frédéric Laforet, who had starred since 2005 as the "Black Knight" gave his gave his farewell speech as an active performer because of his age. Following his speech he was hounored for his achievements by Bavaria's Ministerpräsident Markus Söder. Frédéric Laforet turned into a coach and a trainer for Mario Luraschi's stunt team "Calvacade" and Kaltenberg's supporting performers. As his successor for the role as "Black Knight" stuntman and actor Ludovic Gortva was chosen. Also in 2022 Mario Luraschi's son Marco Luraschi joined the team of stunt performer at Kaltenberg.

In 2024 Kaltenberg had reportedly become a stage for international culture, integrating a Samurai into the show and presenting bands like Rota Temporis from Italy and Irdorath from Belarus.

In 2025 the event had grown to altogether 1,000 performers, 100,000 visitors and 150 market stalls.

== See also ==
- Ritterfestspiele Bad Bentheim

== Bibliography ==
- Stefan König & Peter Ernszt: Das Kaltenberger Ritterturnier (Munich 2004), ISBN 978-3784429540
