= Leopold of Bavaria =

Leopold of Bavaria may refer to:

- Prince Leopold of Bavaria (1846–1930), German field marshal and titular King of Greece
- Prince Leopold of Bavaria (born 1943), member of the Bavarian Royal House of Wittelsbach and retired racecar driver

== See also ==
- Luitpold of Bavaria
