= Luitpold of Bavaria =

Luitpold of Bavaria may refer to:

- Luitpold, Prince Regent of Bavaria (1821–1912)
- Luitpold Prinz von Bayern (born 1951)
