= König Ludwig Schlossbrauerei =

Bavarian brewery

König Ludwig GmbH & Co. KG Schlossbrauerei Kaltenberg
- Location: Fürstenfeldbruck, Bavaria, Germany
- Coordinates: 48.1826°N 11.2526°E
- Opened: 1871
- Annual production volume: 340,000 hectolitres (290,000 US bbl)
- Website: www.koenig-ludwig-brauerei.com

The König Ludwig GmbH & Co. KG Schlossbrauerei Kaltenberg is a brewery in Fürstenfeldbruck, Upper Bavaria, Germany. Their slogan, "Bier von königlicher Hoheit", or "Beer of royal highness", refers to the brewery's heritage which can be traced back through the Kingdom of Bavaria, long associated with beer and brewing. The current proprietor, Prince Luitpold of the House of Wittelsbach, is the great-grandson of the last King of Bavaria, Ludwig III, and by extent a descendant of the original signatories of the 1516 Bavarian Purity Law, and Ludwig I, whose wedding celebration marked the first Oktoberfest.

== History ==
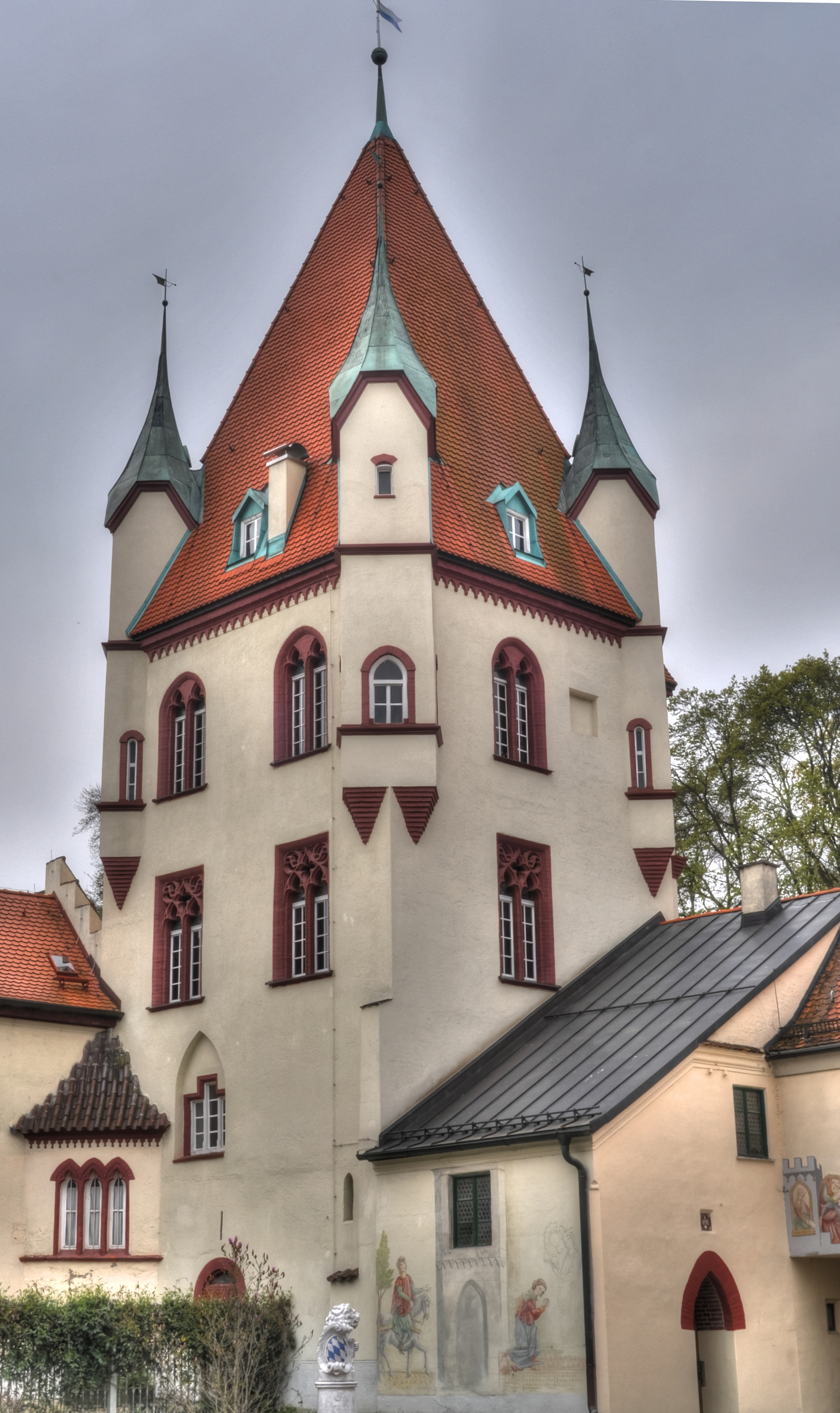
Kaltenberg Castle

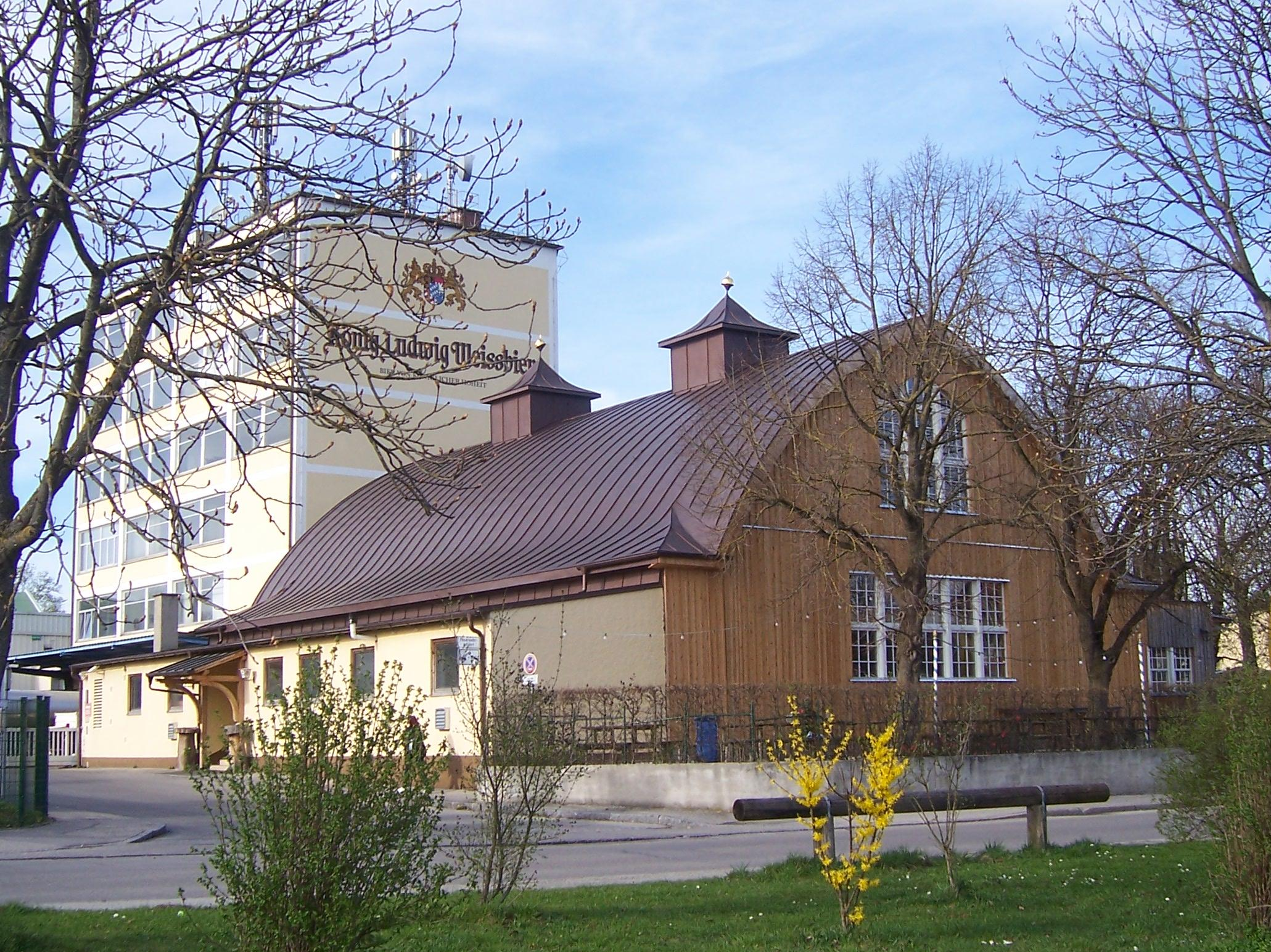
Marthabräu brewery

The House of Wittelsbach is known to have owned a brewery by 1260. 32 years later, Rudolf I, Duke of Bavaria built Schloss Kaltenberg, which houses part of the brewery's facilities today. The brewery as it exists today was opened in 1870.

In 1980, Marthabräu brewery in Fürstenfeldbruck was purchased, where the company administration is now located and where a large part of its production takes place. In 2001, Prince Luitpold entered into a 50/50 joint partnership with Warsteiner. A smaller brewery in Holzkirchen was also integrated into the company in 2007, and a joint-venture established with Postbrauerei in Thannhausen.

As of 2004, production was up to 340,000 hectoliters annually, of which 100,000 are produced at the brewery's Schloss Kaltenberg facilities. Much of the international production takes place under licence in the United Kingdom, Sweden, India, Indonesia and Croatia under the Kaltenberg brand.

== Beers ==
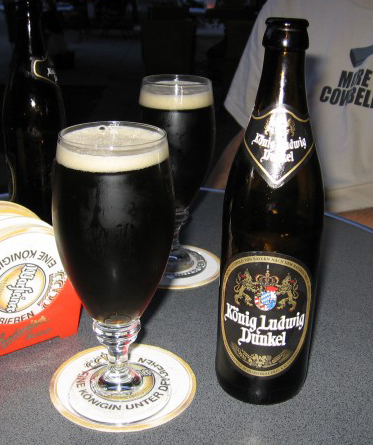
A glass of König Ludwig Dunkel.

König Ludwig brand

- König Ludwig Weissbier Hell
- König Ludwig Weissbier Dunkel
- König Ludwig Weissbier Kristall
- König Ludwig Weissbier Leicht
- König Ludwig Weissbier Alkoholfrei
- König Ludwig Dunkel
- König Ludwig Hell

Kaltenberg brand

- Kaltenberg Spezial
- Kaltenberg Schloss-Keller Naturtrüb
- Kaltenberg 3,8
- Kaltenberg Leicht
- Kaltenberg Ritterbock
- Kaltenberg Pils (Croatia)
- Kaltenberg Royal Lager (India)
- Königliches Festtagsbier
- Prinzregent Luitpold Weizenbock
