= Geordie (film) =

1955 British film by Frank Launder

- US film poster for Geordie
- Directed by: Frank Launder
- Screenplay by: Sidney Gilliat; Frank Launder
- Based on: Wee Geordie by David Walker
- Produced by: Sidney Gilliat; Frank Launder
- Starring: Bill Travers; Paul Young; Alastair Sim; Norah Gorsen
- Cinematography: Wilkie Cooper
- Edited by: Thelma Connell
- Music by: William Alwyn
- Production company: Argonaut Film
- Distributed by: British Lion Films (UK)
- Release date: 2 September 1955 (UK); 7 October 1956 (US)
- Running time: 100 minutes
- Country: United Kingdom
- Language: English
- Box office: £218,384 (UK)

Geordie (U.S. title: Wee Geordie) is a 1955 British film directed Frank Launder and starring Bill Travers, Paul Young, Alastair Sim and Norah Gorsen. It was written and produced by Launder and Sidney Gilliat, based on David Walker's 1950 novel of the same title. A Scotsman becomes an athlete and competes at the 1956 Summer Olympics in Melbourne.

== Plot ==
The story begins in a small Highland school classroom. Geordie MacTaggart is a "wee" (small) Scottish schoolboy, and the son of a gamekeeper. Although his best friend Jean does not mind his height, after he sees a newspaper advertisement for a bodybuilding correspondence course offered by Henry Samson, he sends for the course and embarks diligently on Samson's fitness programme. By the time Geordie turns 21, he has grown into a tall, fit man who continues to follow Samson's long-distance instructions. Jean, however, disapproves of the amount of time he spends training.

Geordie works as assistant to his father, the local laird's head gamekeeper. One day, when they are out together in a storm, his father becomes ill. Geordie carries him home many miles, but his father develops pneumonia and dies. The laird makes Geordie the new gamekeeper.

One day, he gets a letter from Samson, who suggests he take up hammer throwing. On his first attempt, he almost hits the laird, who then tries to show him how it is done. However, the laird's own hammer throw almost hits the local minister, who is passing by on his bike. It turns out that the minister is knowledgeable about the sport, and he trains Geordie. At the minister's urging, Geordie reluctantly enters a Highland games event. He initially makes two bad throws, but after the unexpected appearance (and encouragement) of Jean, he wins with his final throw.

Two members of the Olympics selection committee visit him and invite him to join the British team for the Melbourne Olympic Games in Australia. Geordie is once again reluctant, as he does not particularly care to compete against others, but finally agrees. He takes the train to London, where he finally gets to meet Henry Samson, who has come to see him off when he boards the ship for Australia.

Unhappy to be away from home, Geordie finds it difficult to be enthusiastic about training on board ship. However, Helga, a Danish female shot putter, takes a shine to Geordie and talks him out of his mood, though Geordie remains oblivious to the fact that she is attracted to him. When they reach Melbourne, Geordie goes sightseeing with Helga before the games, buying a highly unusual hat for Jean. An accident occurs nearby, and a man is pinned underneath a car. After several men working together are unable to lift the car, Geordie manages to do it all by himself. His feat is reported in the newspapers, and he becomes very popular.

A problem arises: Geordie insists on wearing his late father's Black Watch kilt in the opening ceremony, something he had promised his mother he would do. When he is told that he must wear the same uniform as the rest of the team, he states "no kilt, no performance!" Not having received a reply from London, Lord Pauceton, the head of the British team, gives in. After Geordie comes out last in the opening parade of athletes in his kilt, Pauceton receives a telegram emphatically ordering him not to let Geordie wear his kilt, but he ignores it.

During the competition, a listless, dispirited Geordie fails with his first two throws. Then, before his third and final throw, he finds inspiration by recalling Jean's encouragement at his first competition. He then makes a world record throw and wins the competition. However, Jean hears on the radio that Helga has rushed up, embracing and kissing Geordie in front of everyone in the stadium, and she is heartbroken.

On Geordie's return, there is no one to meet him at the station apart from his mother and a driver for the trap. On the way home, they encounter the laird, who tells him that many think his actions have brought scandal to the glen. Geordie spots Jean fishing and goes to her. They argue, then fall in the stream. After they get out, Geordie shows her the hat he bought for her; she pretends to think it is "braw" (fine), and they kiss and make up.

== Cast ==
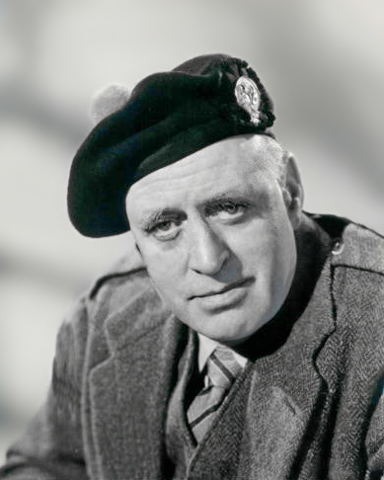
Alastair Sim as the laird

- Alastair Sim as the laird
- Bill Travers as Geordie MacTaggart
  - Paul Young as young Geordie
- Norah Gorsen as Jean Donaldson
  - Anna Ferguson as Young Jean
- Molly Urquhart as Geordie's mother
- Francis de Wolff as Henry Samson
- Jack Radcliffe as the minister
- Brian Reece as Olympic selector
- Raymond Huntley as Olympic selector
- Miles Malleson as Lord Paunceton
- Jameson Clark as Geordie's father
- Doris Goddard as Helga
- Stanley Baxter as postman
- Duncan Macrae as schoolmaster
- Michael Ripper as Australian journalist

== Production ==
The film was originally to be directed by Gilliat but he was caught up with post production problems on The Constant Husband (1955) so Launder stepped in.

== Release ==
The film premiered at the Plaza in London on 2 September 1955.

== Reception ==
=== Box office ===
According to the National Film Finance Corporation, the film made a comfortable profit. According to Kinematograph Weekly, it was a "money maker" at the British box office in 1955.

=== Critical ===
The Monthly Film Bulletin wrote: "Bill Travers is a young player of individual gifts, and he conveys the shy, honest simplicity of Geordie most appealingly; this is a performance attractively free of mannerism, and has a genuine freshness. With better handling, the characterisation would probably have become more rounded, more complete. But Frank Launder's treatment is a sad disappointment. Graceless and superficial, it seems to work against the subject a great deal of the time. It falls back all too often on obvious comedy, it is sentimental where it should be tender and commonplace where it should be discerning."

Variety wrote: "Picture is another fine example of the teamwork of Launder and Gilliat. Admittedly, the film has its weaknesses and judicious scissoring would heighten the tempo. But the very naiveté of the principal characters gives the subject the necessary warm human values and right degree of sentiment. The duo share most of the technical credits (as always) this time Launder gets billing for the direction. Their experienced touch is clearly in evidence."

The Times' reviewer found the film to have "gracious and decorous atmosphere; the steep hills have stamped themselves on everyone's imagination, so that the story-telling is not flat, the dialogue never airless. The earth is beneath us, the sky above, and to receive messages from both and to interpret them is the splendidly authentic figure of Mr. Alastair Sim's Laird".

== See also ==
- List of films about the sport of athletics
