= Doris Goddard =

Australian actress, singer and publican

- Born: Doris Goddard Hoynes; 1 March 1930; Forest Lodge, New South Wales, Australia
- Died: 29 July 2019 (aged 89); Sydney, New South Wales, Australia
- Other names: Doris Goddard Hoynes-Bishop
- Occupation(s): Actress, singer, publican
- Spouse: Charlie Bishop

Doris Goddard (1 March 1930 – 29 July 2019) was an Australian cabaret singer and film actress; in her later life, she was also the publican of several hotels in Sydney, including the Hotel Hollywood.

== Life and career ==
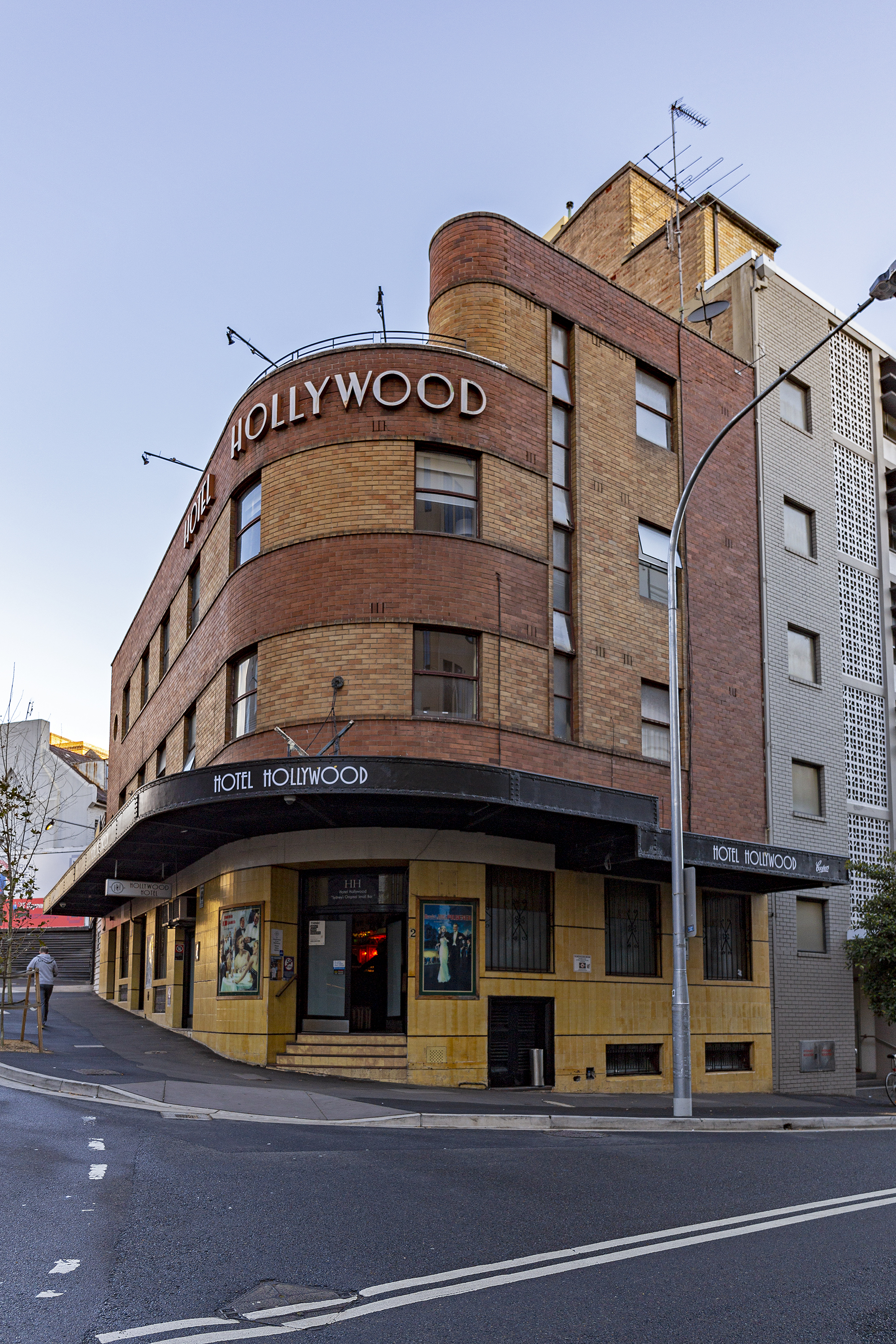
Hotel Hollywood in August 2018

Goddard was an entertainer who moved to England to become a star but was told she was too tall (at 5'8") to play roles alongside male actors. Goddard called this "an irreversible physical disability" and was told to forget about being on stage and film; she moved to cabaret instead. However, the film Geordie (1955) required a tall actress to play alongside Bill Travers, who was 6'4"; Goddard was sent a telegram requesting her services and arrived on set the next day.

As a tall actress in Hollywood, Goddard was required to play a Russian spy, Maria, in the 1956 film The Iron Petticoat. She kidnapped Bob Hope and played alongside Katharine Hepburn. Goddard landed several movie roles and is credited to have performed in at least twelve films, most famously Geordie (1955), Tim (1979) and Hostage (1983).

At the age of 34, Goddard moved into the hotel industry; she took to it like "a duck to alcohol" as Doris herself put it. She ran several hotels in Sydney, including the Marlborough Hotel in Newtown and the West End Hotel in Balmain. In 1977, she and her husband Charlie Bishop purchased the Hotel Hollywood in Surry Hills. Goddard said "What makes the Hotel Hollywood quite unique is that we haven't tried to tart it up." Charlie worked behind the bar with Goddard singing at the bar with her guitar. During her later years Goddard actively protested Sydney Lockout Laws.

Goddard lived upstairs in the hotel until 18 months before her death, when she moved into a care facility; she died on 29 July 2019. She was buried on 6 August at Rookwood cemetery following a service at St Canice Church in Rushcutters Bay. In a tribute, Sydney Morning Herald journalist Jenny Noyes described Goddard as a 'diva, icon, humanitarian and activist'. Sydney’s deputy Lord Mayor, Linda Scott, called Goddard a "beloved icon" of the city and "always a star". Sydney Lord Mayor Clover Moore held a one minute silence in Council on 19 August.

== Recognition ==
As part of the city's Vivid Festival in May 2019 Goddard was inducted as Heckler's 51st iconic woman; the list included Kate Moss, Brigitte Bardot, Amy Winehouse and Queen Elizabeth II. As part of the celebrations and in recognition of Goddard's new status a montage, created by women and featuring the 51 iconic women, was projected onto the Hotel Hollywood's facade.
