= Schloss Kaltenberg =

Castle in Geltendorf, Germany

Coordinates: 48.132°N 10.994°E

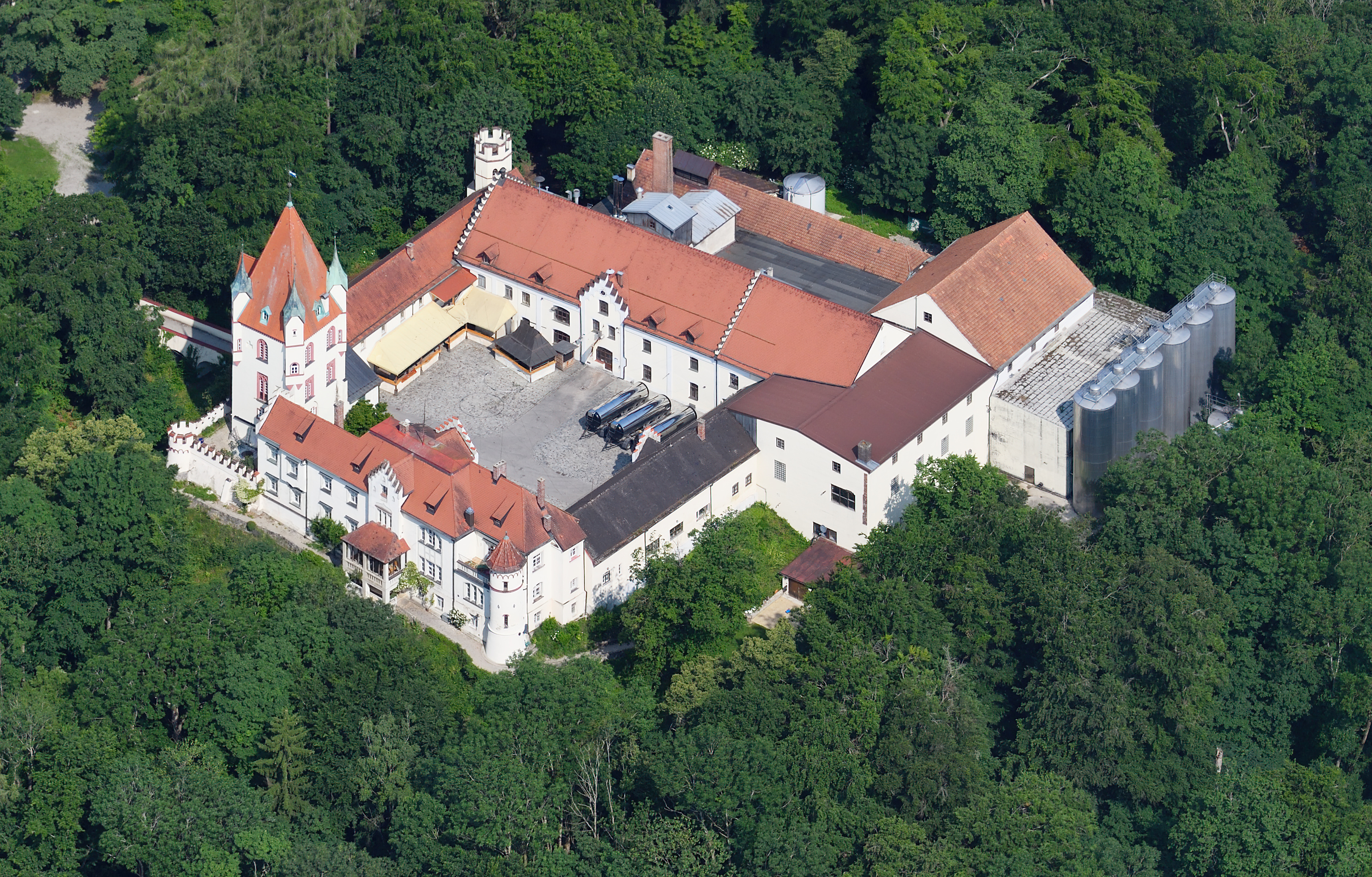
Aerial view of Schloss Kaltenberg

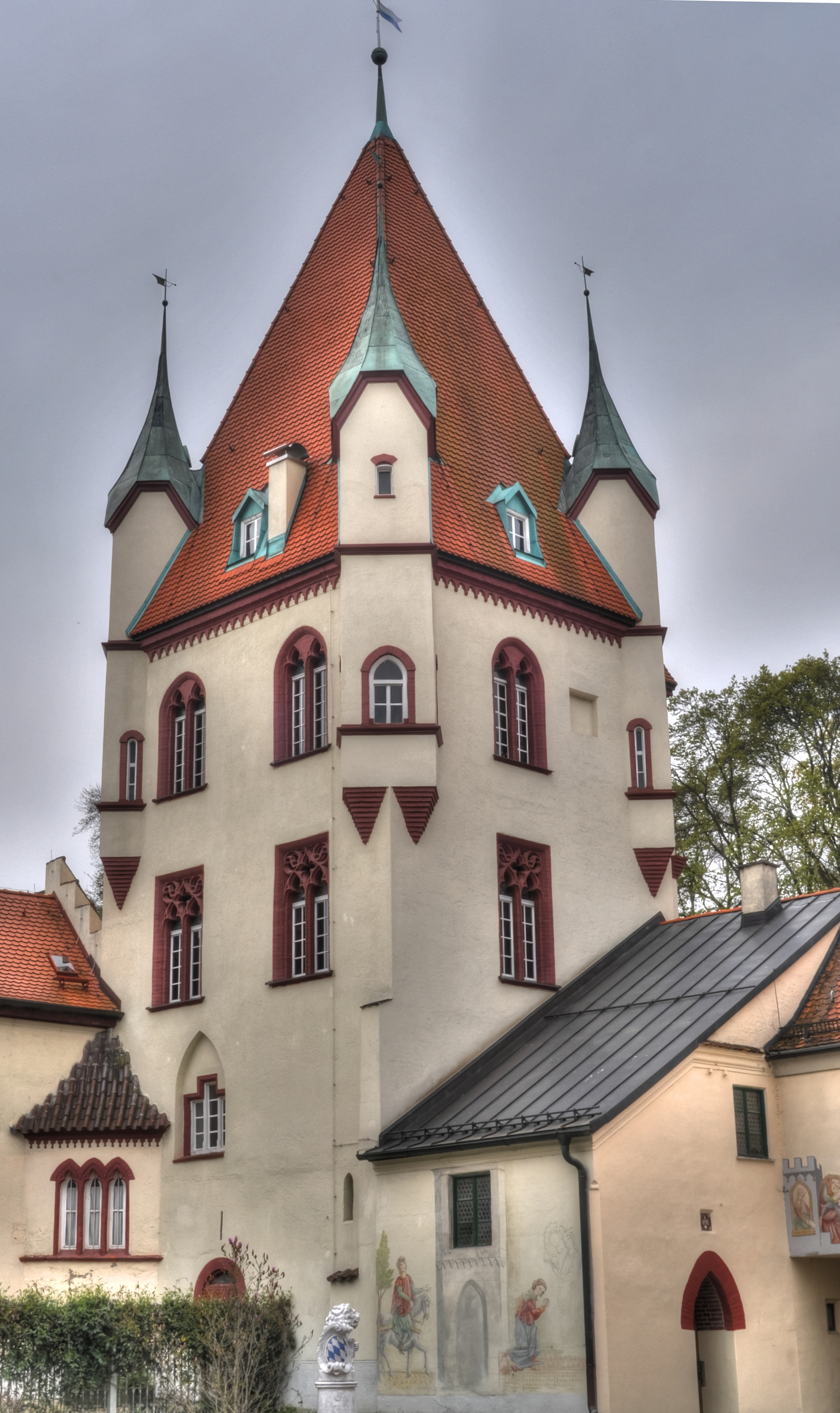
The tower of Kaltenberg Castle

The Schloss Kaltenberg is a castle in the village of Geltendorf in Upper Bavaria, Germany. The castle was built in 1292 and is currently under the proprietorship of Prince Luitpold of Bavaria, the great-grandson of the last king of Bavaria, Ludwig III.

== History ==
- 1292 the castle is built by Rudolf I, Duke of Bavaria
- 1320 the castle is destroyed during a family feud
- 1425 the castle is rebuilt by the Augsburger Patrician Peter Rehlinger
- 1468 sold to the house of Hundt zu Lautterbach
- 1514 the historian Wiguläus Hundt was born in the castle
- 1612 the castle is assumed by the Jesuits
- 1633 during the Thirty Years' War the Swedish destroy the castle
- 1781 the Knights of Malta assume ownership
- 1870 a brewery is founded and the castle was renovated in the neo-Gothic style, which remains to the present
- 1900 the painter Lorenzo Quaglio assumes ownership. Quaglio lived in the Castle and made many paintings of the Castle and its surroundings. Lorenzo's brother Domenico is known as architect of the most famous Castle in Bavaria, namely Neuschwanstein.
- c. 1920 the castle brewery joined the Unionbrewery in Munich, which was owned by the brewer Josef Schülein. Due to the war his family fled to America but returned in 1948 and claimed their property back.
- 1955 the Schülein heirs sold the castle to Princess Irmingard of Bavaria (1923–2010), the mother of Prince Luitpold.

== The castle today ==
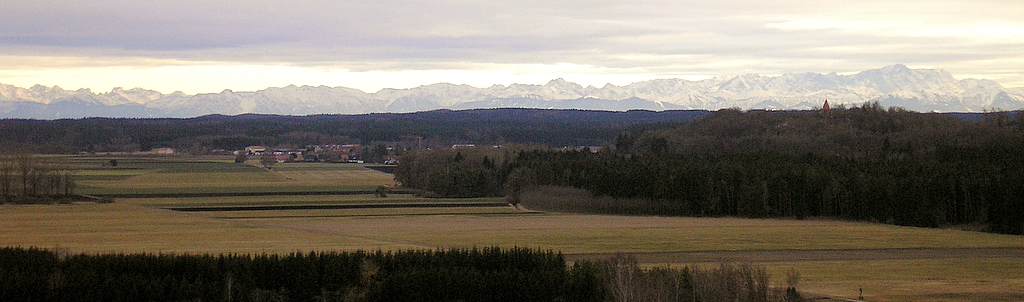
The tower of Kaltenberg castle (right) in front of the Alps

Since 1870 part of the König Ludwig Schlossbrauerei is housed in the Schloss Kaltenberg. Over 100,000 hectoliters of beer are produced there, about one-quarter to one-third of the company's total production. Prince Luitpold of Bavaria, CEO of the brewery, and his family currently reside in the castle. The castle also offers a ballroom for events as well as two restaurants. Moreover the castle is host to the Kaltenberger Ritterturnier, a knights' tournament that draws over 100,000 visitors annually.
