= Little Women (1950 TV series) =

British TV drama series (1950–1951)

- Genre: Period drama
- Based on: Little Women by Louisa May Alcott
- Written by: Winifred Oughton; Brenda R. Thompson
- Starring: Sheila Shand Gibbs; Jane Hardie; Norah Gorsen; David Jacobs; Anita Sharp-Bolster
- Country of origin: United Kingdom
- Original language: English
- No. of episodes: 6

Production
- Producer: Pamela Brown
- Running time: 30 minutes
- Production company: BBC

Original release
- Network: BBC Television Service
- Release: 12 December 1950 – 23 January 1951

Little Women is a British television adaptation broadcast by the BBC from 1950 to 1951 in six parts. An adaptation by Winifred Oughton and Brenda R. Thompson of Louisa May Alcott's 1868-69 two-volume novel Little Women.

The lost series was broadcast live and the transmissions were not recorded.

The production was the first adaptation of the novel by the BBC. There were later adaptations in 1958, 1970 and 2017.

== Cast ==
- Meg March - Sheila Shand Gibbs
- Jo March - Jane Hardie
- Beth March - Norah Gorsen
- Laurie - David Jacobs
- Hannah Mullet - Anita Sharp-Bolster
- Amy March - Susan Stephen
- Mrs March - Barbara Everest
- Mr James Laurence - Wensley Pithey
- John Brooke - Alan Bromly
- Aunt March - Violet Gould
- Mr March - Arthur Ridley

== Crew ==
=== Writing ===
- Louisa May Alcott (6 episodes, 1950-1951)
- Winifred Oughton (6 episodes, 1950-1951)
- Brenda R. Thompson (6 episodes, 1950-1951)

=== Series Production Design ===
- Stephen Taylor (6 episodes, 1950-1951)
- Lawrence Broadhouse (2 episodes, 1951)

=== Producer ===
- Pamela Brown (6 episodes, 1950-1951)

== Episodes ==
| No. | Title | Original release date |
|---|---|---|
| 1 | "A Merry Christmas" | 12 December 1950 |
| 2 | "The Laurence Boy" | 19 December 1950 |
| 3 | "The Palace Beautiful" | 2 January 1951 |
| 4 | "The Telegram" | 9 January 1951 |
| 5 | "Dark Days" | 16 January 1951 |
| 6 | "Pleasant Meadows" | 23 January 1951 |
