= Norah Gorsen =

British actress (1931–2020)

Norah Ethel Gaussen (22 November 1931 – 15 April 2020), better known as Norah Gorsen, was a British actress.

Gorsen was born in Weymouth, Dorset, on 22 November 1931. Her first big role was on stage as Wendy in a 1953 production of Peter Pan, starring opposite Pat Kirkwood. Gorsen, who was 20 at the time and living in Hampstead, London, nearly missed her audition for the role after muddling up the date. At the last minute, she threw together the combination of a sophisticated suit, high heeled shoes, nylons and a tight skirt, and rushed to the audition. She had several roles on film and television, including the movies Those People Next Door and Personal Affair (both 1953). On TV, her appearances included Beth in the BBC's 1950 version of Little Women, and in the soap Emergency Ward 10 in 1958. She also appeared as Lady Rowena in an episode of the 1958 TV adaption of Ivanhoe, as well as appearing in a 1956 episode of The Adventures of Sir Lancelot. However, she has not appeared in any acting role since the 1960s.

One of Gorsen's best known roles was in the film Geordie (1955), where she played the title character's girlfriend.

In 1960, Gorsen married the actor Ronald Lewis, with whom she worked at Regent's Park Open Air Theatre. She died in Mouans-Sartoux, France on 15 April 2020, at the age of 88.
