= Hotel Hollywood (building) =

Historic hotel in Sydney, Australia

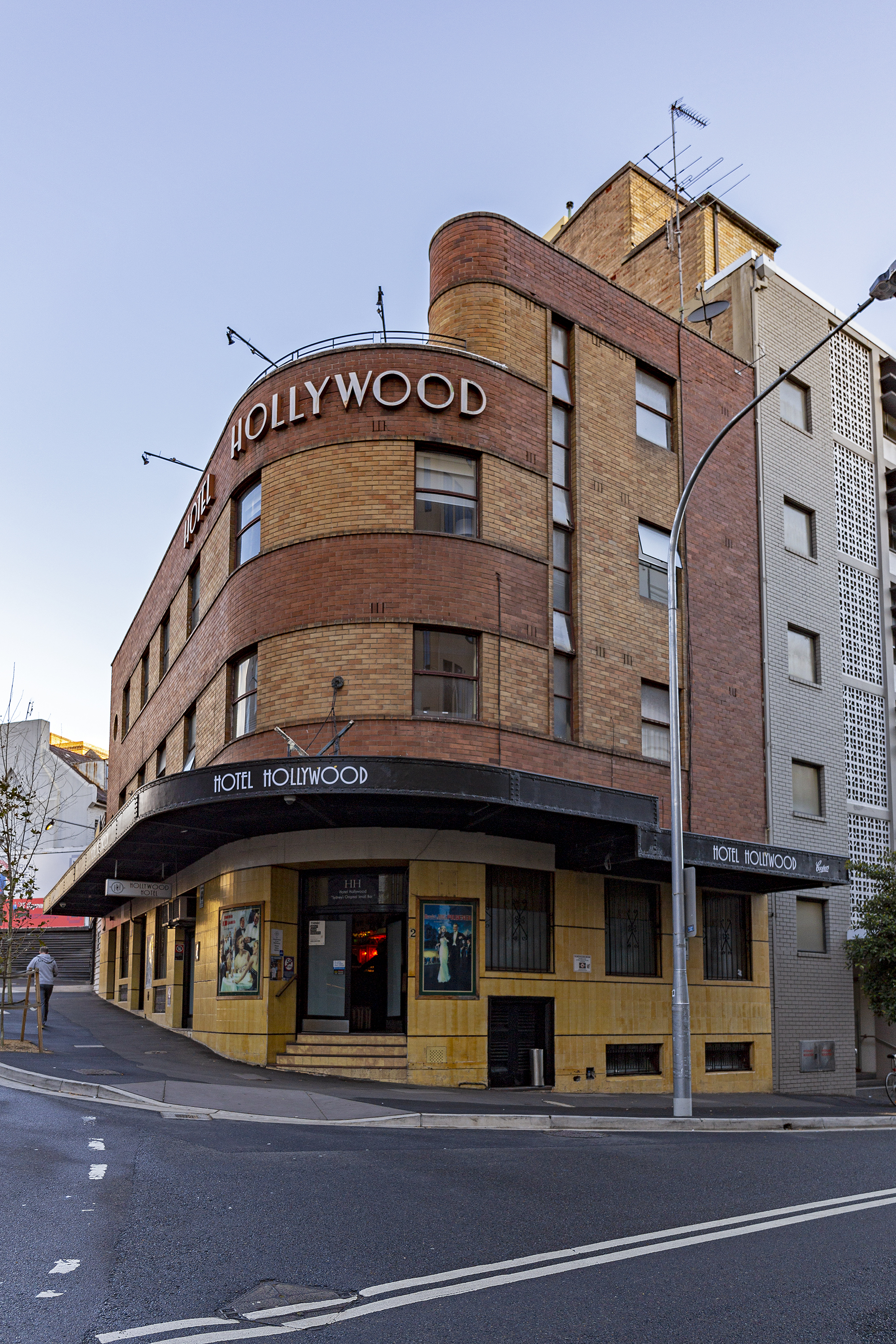
- Hotel Hollywood in August 2018
- Interactive map of the Hotel Hollywood area
- Former names: The Nevada

General information
- Status: Open
- Type: Australian pub
- Architectural style: Inter-war Functionalist
- Location: 2 Foster Street, Surry Hills, Sydney, Australia
- Coordinates: 33°52′47″S 151°12′38″E
- Completed: 1942
- Owner: Petersen Group

Design and construction
- Architect: John Hellyer
- Main contractor: WM Hughes

Other information
- Number of rooms: 16

Website
- www.hollywoodhotelsydney.com.au

The Hotel Hollywood is a building located on the corner of Foster and Hunt Streets in Surry Hills, Sydney, New South Wales, Australia.

== History ==
The building has aesthetic, historical, and social significance. It is one of only five hotels constructed in the Inter-War Functionalist style in the city during a short period between 1938 and 1942; the others are the Australian (Broadway), the Civic, the Kegroom Tavern, and Sutherlands. The hotel is historically 'intact', having had no internal or external alterations of any kind. It is heritage-listed as part of the Sydney Local Environmental Plan on 14 December 2012.

Once owned by Tooth & Co, it was originally called the Nevada. The Hotel Hollywood acquired its name in 1940 due to its location near the cinema-related industry. It saw women drinking at its bars as early as 1950. It is now most notable for its unpretentious, well-worn interior, the spinning mirror ball, and actress Doris Goddard. Goddard purchased the building in 1978 for $178,000 and remained its publican and proprietress for 42 years, until her death in July 2019. In June 2021, the building was purchased by private investment firm Petersen Group for over $9 million.

== Film and television credits ==
The movie Tim was filmed at the Hotel Hollywood as was Erskineville Kings (1999). The film clip Boots was filmed at the hotel and features Doris Goddard (actress and publican) singing and playing guitar in the credits. Other television series filmed at the Hollywood include Blue Murder, Brides of Christ and Water Rats.

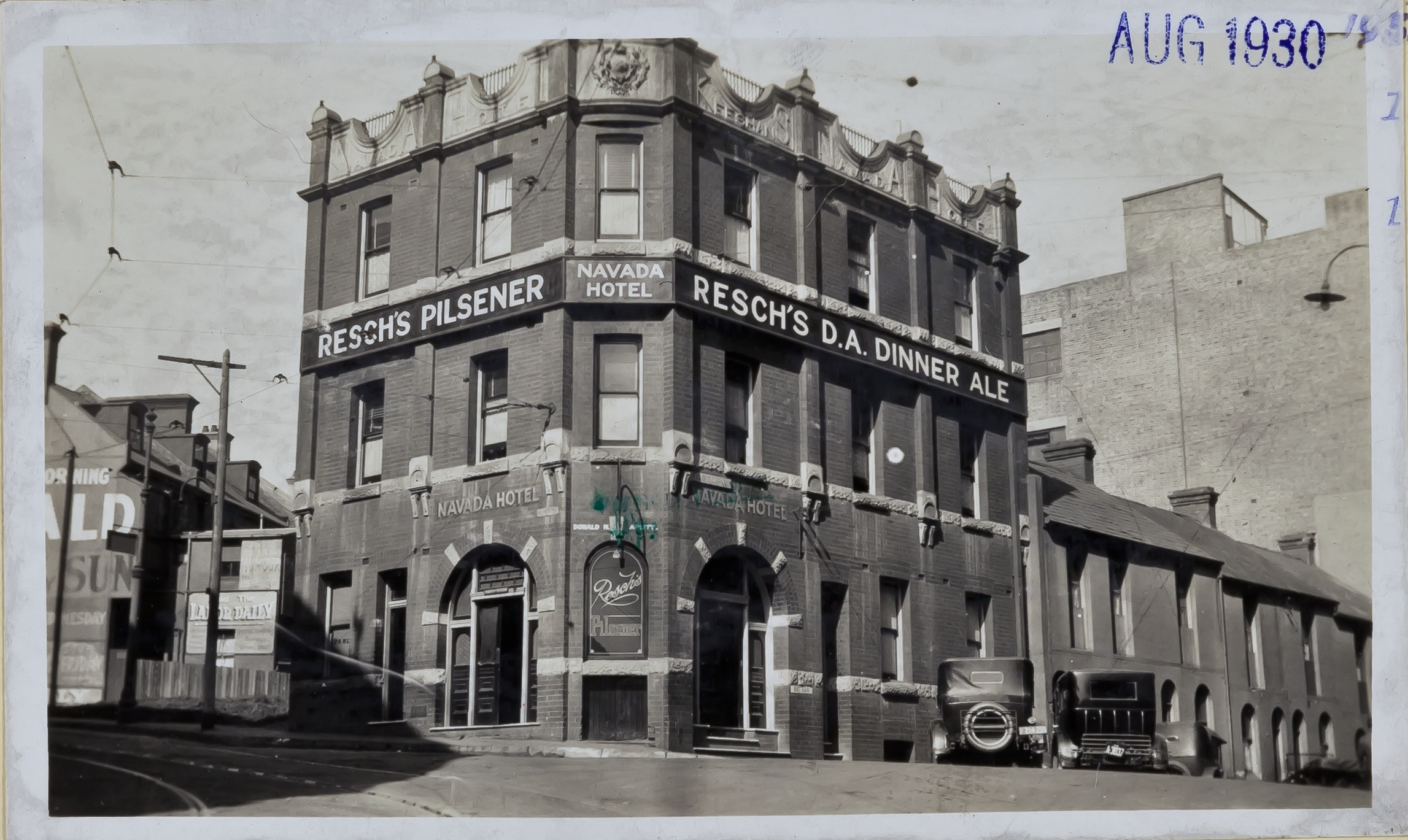
Hotel Hollywood in August 1930

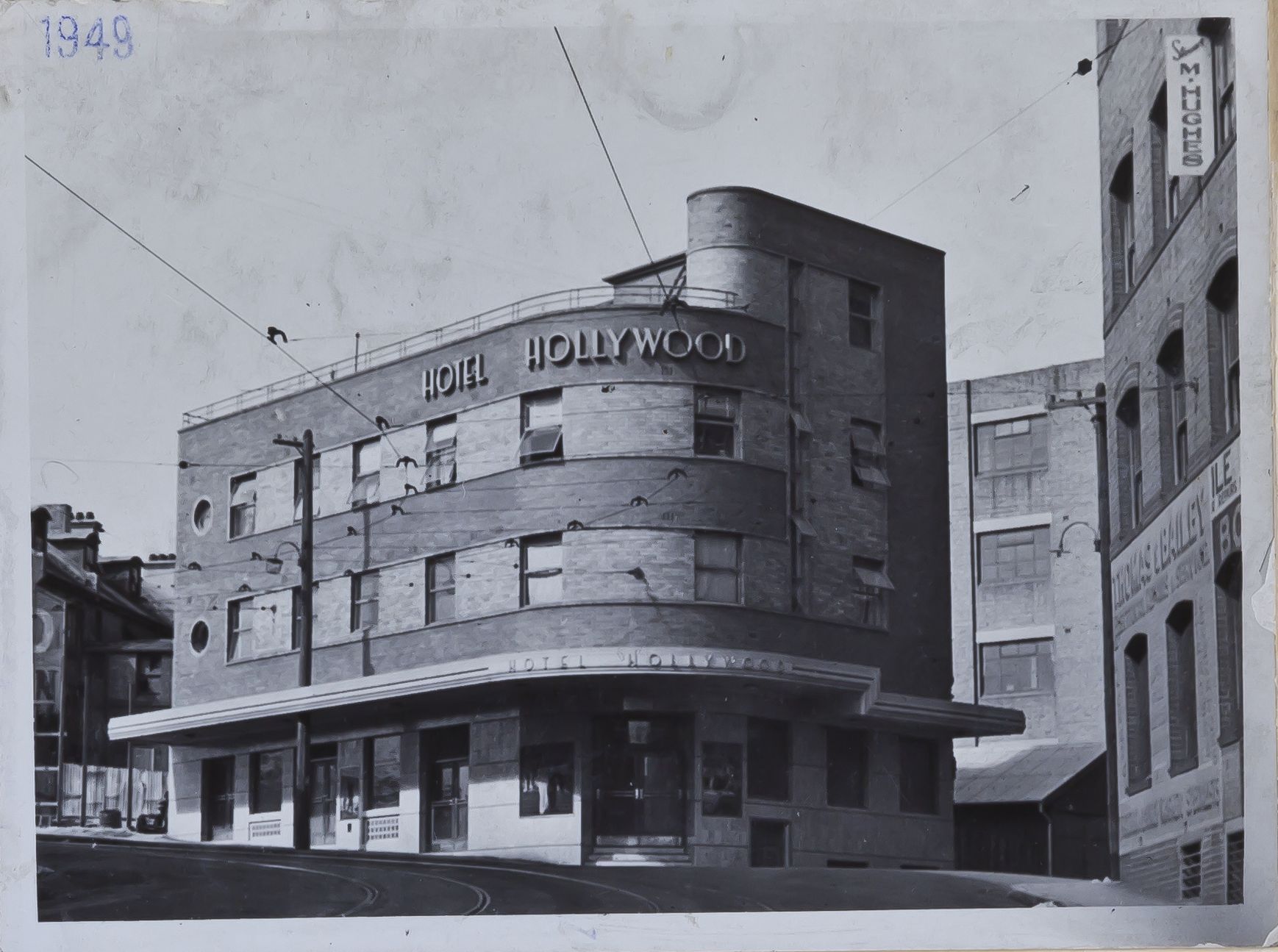
Hotel Hollywood in 1950
