= Irdorath =

Belarusian folk rock band

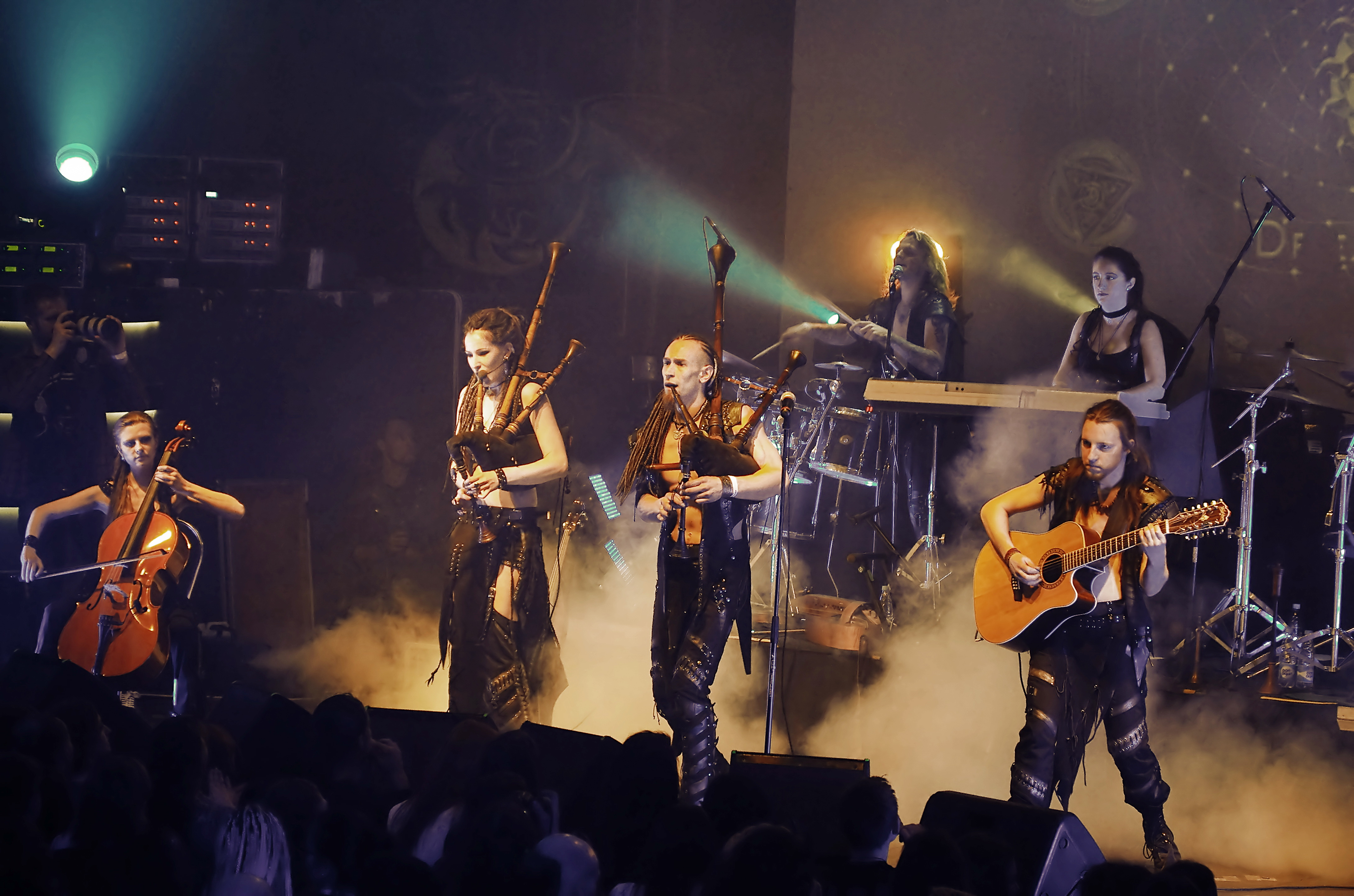
Performing live in 2015

Irdorath is a Belarusian folk rock music group, formed in 2011. In 2017 they were the first Belarusian act to participate in the Wacken Open Air festival. In 2021 band members were sentenced to two years in prison for their participation in the 2020–2021 Belarusian protests, accompanying demonstrators with drums and bagpipes. In 2024 the band was reformed in exile in Berlin.

== Discography ==
=== Albums ===
- Ad Astra (2012)
- Dreamcatcher (2015)
- Wild (2017)
- Live in the Woods (2025)
- Bestiarium (2026)

=== Singles ===
- Serca Raskolata (2020)
- Zorami (2023)
- Vaukalak (2024)
