= Luitpold Prinz von Bayern =

Bavarian prince

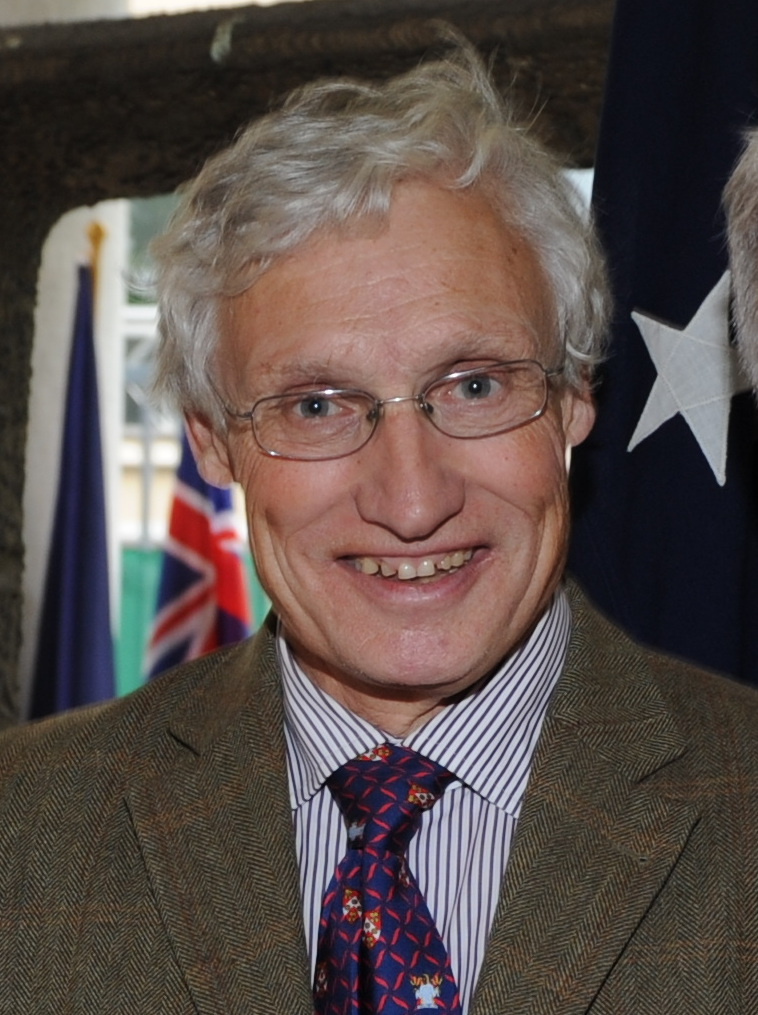
- Luitpold in July 2012
- Born: 14 April 1951 (age 75); Schloß Leutstetten, Leutstetten, Bavaria, West Germany
- Spouse: Katrin Beatrix Wiegand (m. 1979)
- Issue: Auguste; Alice Auersperg; Ludwig; Heinrich; Karl
Names
- German: Luitpold Rupprecht Heinrich Prinz von Bayern
- House: Wittelsbach
- Father: Prince Ludwig of Bavaria
- Mother: Princess Irmingard of Bavaria

Luitpold Rupprecht Heinrich Prinz von Bayern (born 14 April 1951) is a member of the House of Wittelsbach, which reigned as Kings of Bavaria until 1918, and the proprietor and former CEO of the brewery König Ludwig Schlossbrauerei. He is second in line of succession to the headship of the former ruling dynasty, currently held by his first cousin Franz, Duke of Bavaria, after the latter's likely immediate successor and younger brother Max Emanuel.

== Early life ==
Luitpold was born at Schloß Leutstetten near Starnberg, in Bavaria. He is the only surviving child of Prince Ludwig of Bavaria (1913–2008) and his wife Princess Irmingard of Bavaria (1923–2010).

== Marriage ==
On 25 June 1979, Luitpold married Katrin Beatrix Wiegand (born 19 September 1951 in Munich), daughter of Gerd Wiegand (1922 in Cottbus – 1994 in Munich), architect, and first wife Ellen Schumacher. Initially the union was considered morganatic, but on 3 March 1999, the marriage was declared retroactively to be dynastic on the condition their children contracted dynastic marriages. The couple had five children.

The eldest son is Ludwig Prinz von Bayern (b. 1982), the next heir presumptive to the headship of the House of Wittelsbach after his father. He is involved in development aid in Kenya, where he established the “Learning Lions” project, a campus where up to 250 students live and learn, with the Nymphenburg Aid Association, a family-run aid organization dating back to the 1950s. Ludwig and his wife Sophie Alexandra Evekink (b. 1989) have a son, Rupprecht (b. 2024). Luitpold's eldest daughter Auguste (b. 1979), married to Ferdinand Prince of Lippe-Weissenfeld, is a biologist and conducts research on birds at the Max Planck Institute for Biological Intelligence. Her next younger sister Alice (b. 1981), married to Lukas (Prince of) Auersperg, also conducts research in the same field for the University of Veterinary Medicine Vienna.

== Business activities ==
Luitpold is the proprietor and former CEO of a brewery located at Kaltenberg Castle (König Ludwig GmbH & Co. KG Schlossbrauerei Kaltenberg) which was founded in 1871, purchased by his mother in 1955, and largely extended by him. He also purchased Marthabräu brewery at Fürstenfeldbruck in 1980, where his wheat beer is produced. The breweries are now chaired by employed managers. Luitpold also founded the annual jousting tournament Kaltenberger Ritterturnier at Kaltenberg, previously managed by his wife. The second son, Heinrich Rudolf (b. 1986), and his wife now run the event sector, including the event catering.

In 2011 he leased the Nymphenburg Porcelain Manufactory, founded in 1745 by Maximilian III Joseph, Prince-Elector of Bavaria, from the Bavarian State. He converted the cavalier house on the northern roundabouts of Nymphenburg Palace that previously housed the manufactory's administration (production takes place in buildings at the rear), into a luxury holiday home in 2025, available for daily rental, under the name Nymphenburg Palace Royal Residence. It is managed by Kempinski Hotels. A collection of over 1,000 handcrafted porcelain exhibits from 1747 onwards, are on display on the first floor of the former court stables houses in the south wing of the palace itself.

Luitpold owns the Bavarian castles of Leutstetten (a district of Starnberg), previously the residence of his parents, and Kaltenberg, where he lived for the longest time and raised his children. In 2024, he vacated them for his sons and moved into Bullachberg Castle as a tenant − a property the family-run Wittelsbach Compensation Fund had acquired that same year to expand its holdings surrounding Hohenschwangau Castle.

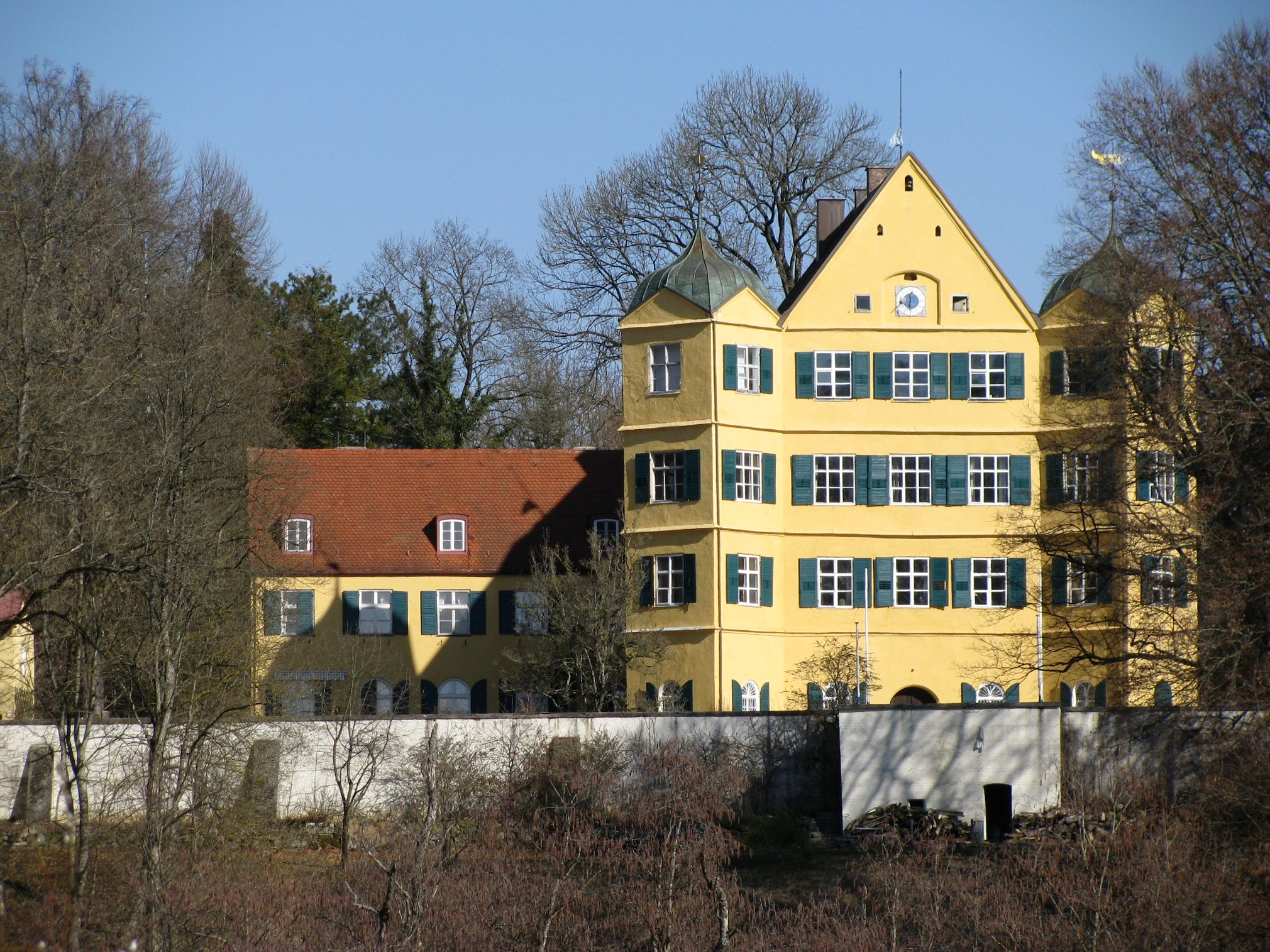
Leutstetten Castle

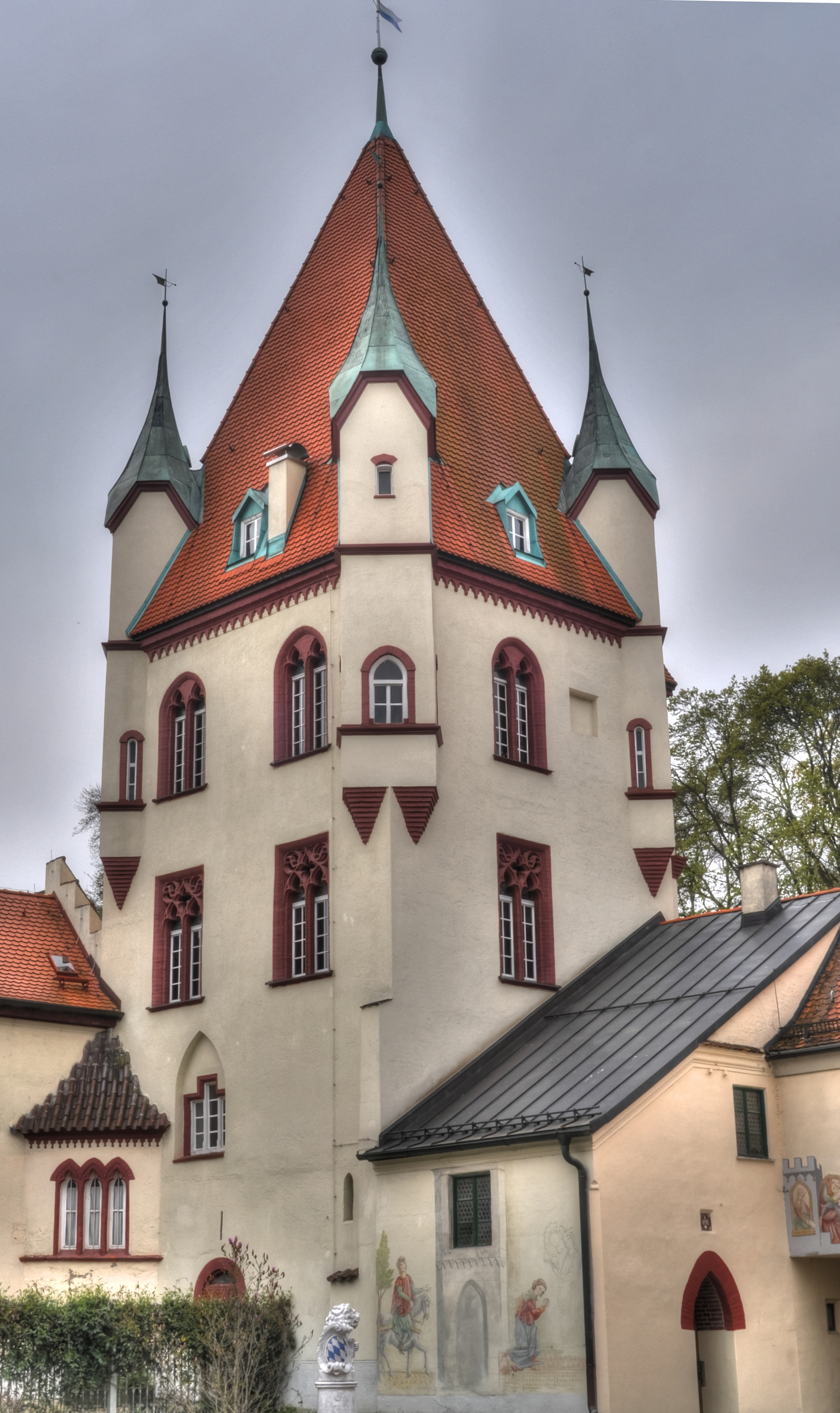
Kaltenberg Castle

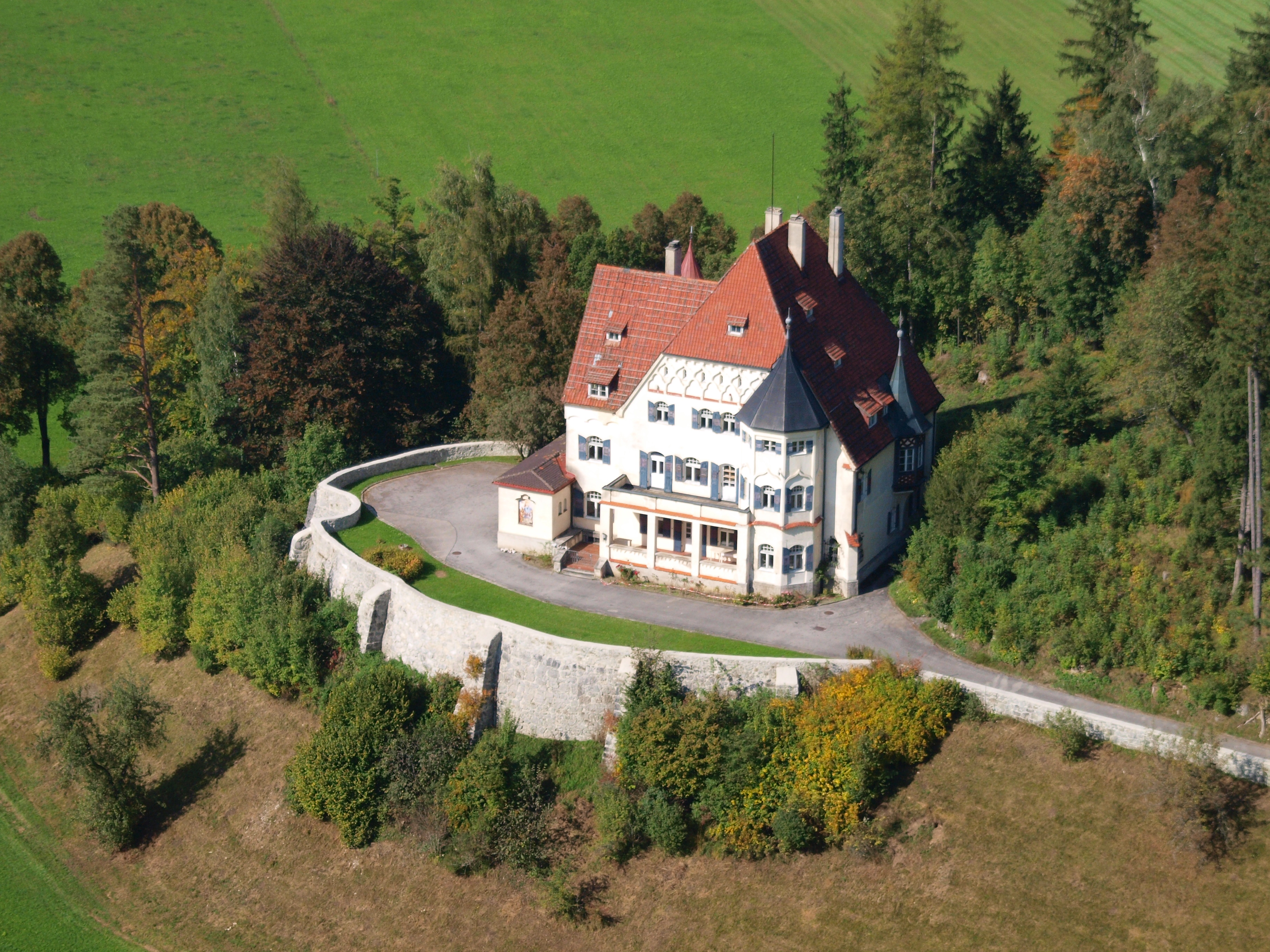
Bullachberg Castle

Luitpold Prinz von Bayern House of Wittelsbach Born: 14 April 1951
Lines of succession
Max Emanuel in Bayern	— TITULAR — Line of succession to the Bavarian throne 2nd position	Succeeded by Prince Ludwig of Bavaria
